= List of geometrid genera: O =

The very large moth family Geometridae contains genera beginning with A, B, C, D, E, F, G, H, I, J, K, L, M, N, O, P, Q, R, S, T, U, V, W, X, Y and Z.

Those beginning with O include:

- Oar
- Oaracta
- Obeidia
- Obelopteryx
- Obila
- Obolcola
- Obrussa
- Ochodontia
- Ochrognesia
- Ochroplutodes
- Ochyria
- Ocoelophora
- Odezia
- Odontocraspeda
- Odontognophos
- Odontopera
- Odontoptila
- Odontorhoe
- Odontothera
- Odysia
- Oedicentra
- Oenochlora
- Oenochroma
- Oenoptila
- Oenospila
- Oenothalia
- Oenotrus
- Oesymna
- Oiozona
- Olerospila
- Oligoclystia
- Oligopleura
- Omaguacua
- Omiza
- Omizodes
- Omopera
- Omophyseta
- Omoplatica
- Omphacodes
- Omphalucha
- Omphax
- Onagrodes
- Oncodocnemis
- Oncopus
- Oneiliana
- Onellaba
- Onychia
- Onychopsis
- Onychora
- Onycodes
- Oospila
- Oospiloma
- Operophtera
- Ophiogramma
- Ophiographa
- Ophthalmitis
- Ophthalmoblysis
- Ophthalmophora
- Opisogonia
- Opisostorthia
- Opistheploce
- Opisthograptis
- Opisthotia
- Opisthoxia
- Oratha
- Orbamia
- Orbasia
- Oreometra
- Oreonoma
- Orgalima
- Organobapta
- Organognophos
- Organomiza
- Organopoda
- Orgyiodes
- Ornithospila
- Orothalassodes
- Orsonoba
- Ortaliella
- Orthobrachia
- Orthocabera
- Orthoclydon
- Orthofidonia
- Ortholithoidia
- Orthonama
- Orthoprora
- Orthorisma
- Orthoserica
- Orthostixis
- Orthotmeta
- Osicerda
- Osteosema
- Otoplecta
- Otucha
- Oulobophora
- Ourapteryx
- Oxychora
- Oxydia
- Oxyfidonia
- Oxymacaria
- Oxyphanes
- Ozola
