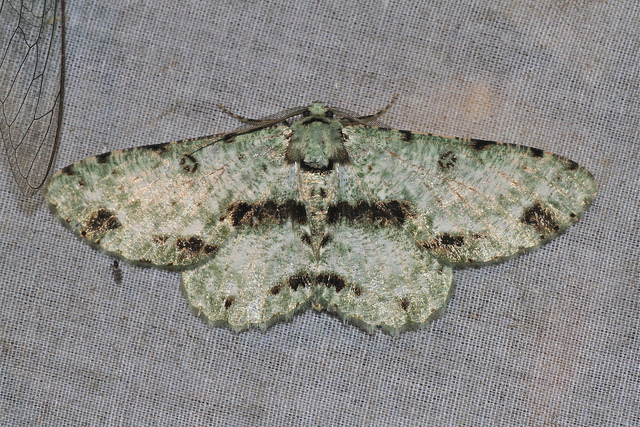
- Borneo, Trusmadi area, lower montane dipterocarp forest

Scientific classification
- Kingdom: Animalia
- Phylum: Arthropoda
- Clade: Pancrustacea
- Class: Insecta
- Order: Lepidoptera
- Family: Geometridae
- Genus: Opthalmitis
- Species: O. cordularioides

Binomial name
- Ophthalmitis cordularioides Holloway, 1993

= Ophthalmitis cordularioides =

Species of moth

Ophthalmitis cordularioides is a moth in the family Geometridae first described by Jeremy Daniel Holloway in 1993. It is found in Borneo and Sumatra.

The wingspan is 27–30 mm for males and about 33 mm for females. In facies this species resembles closely Ophthalmitis cordularia from the Himalayas and Ophthalmitis rufilauta but with black rather than brown markings.
