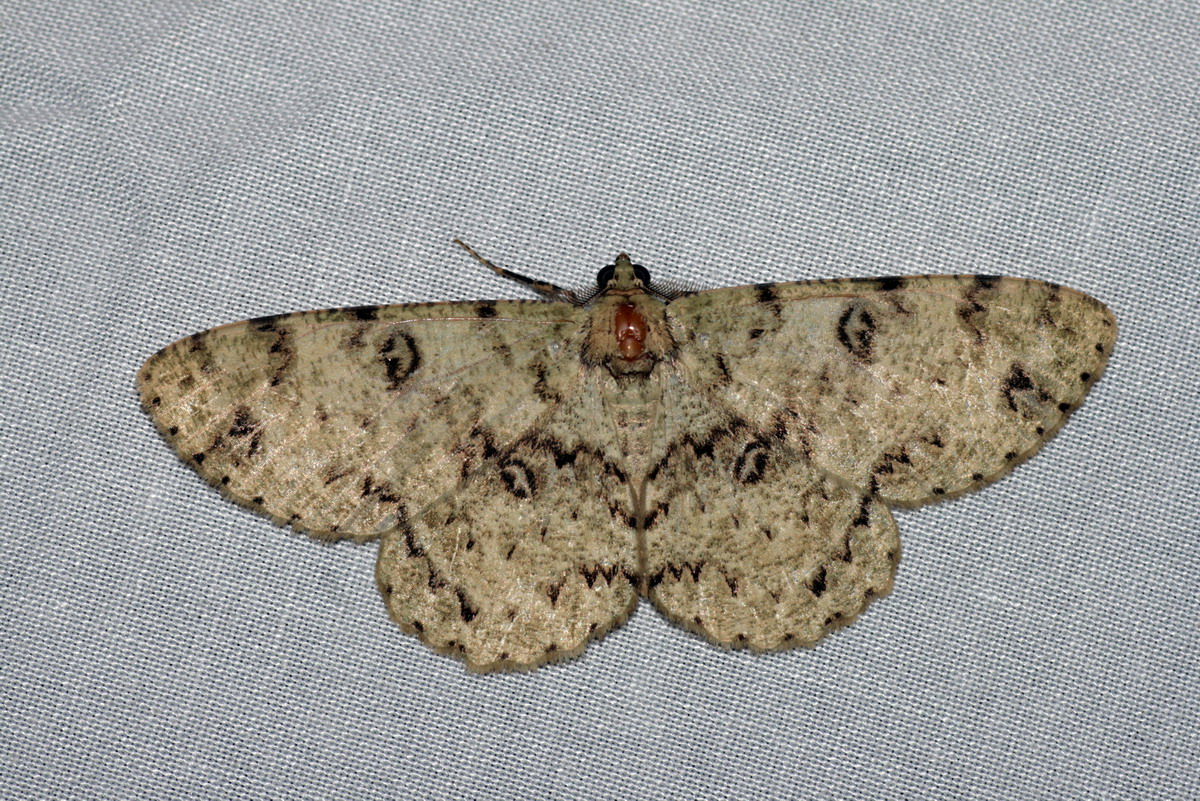

Scientific classification
- Kingdom: Animalia
- Phylum: Arthropoda
- Clade: Pancrustacea
- Class: Insecta
- Order: Lepidoptera
- Family: Geometridae
- Genus: Opthalmitis
- Species: O. basiscripta

Binomial name
- Ophthalmitis basiscripta Holloway, 1993

= Ophthalmitis basiscripta =

Species of moth

Ophthalmitis basiscripta is a moth in the family Geometridae first described by Jeremy Daniel Holloway in 1993. It is found in Borneo and Peninsular Malaysia.

The wingspan is 28–30 mm for males and about 32 mm for females.
