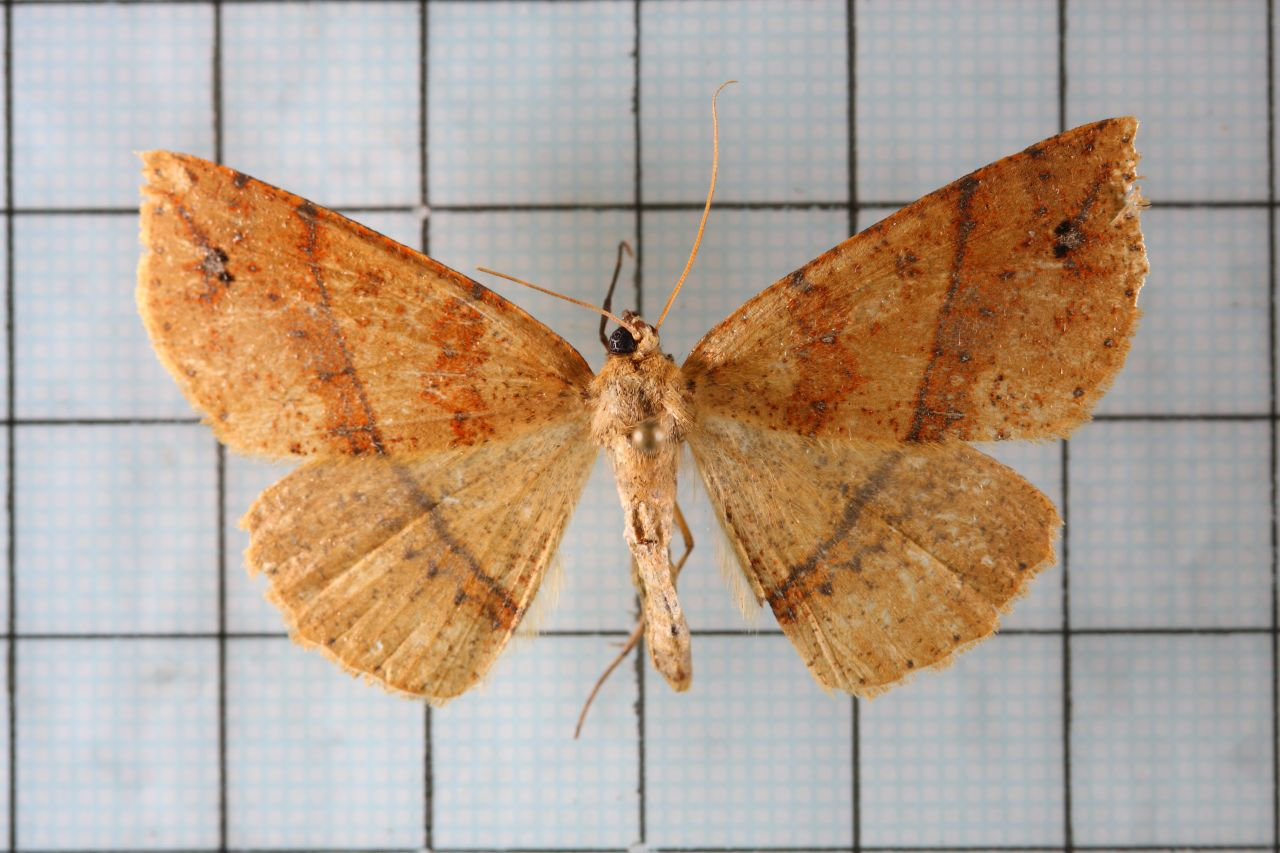

Scientific classification
- Kingdom: Animalia
- Phylum: Arthropoda
- Clade: Pancrustacea
- Class: Insecta
- Order: Lepidoptera
- Family: Geometridae
- Genus: Psyra
- Species: P. spurcataria

Binomial name
- Psyra spurcataria (Walker, 1863)

Synonyms
- Hyperythra spurcataria Walker, 1863; Zethenia florida Bastelberger, 1911

= Psyra spurcataria =

Species of moth

Psyra spurcataria is a species of moth of the family Geometridae first described by Francis Walker in 1863. It is found in Asia, including Taiwan, India and Bhutan.

The wingspan is 45–53 mm.
