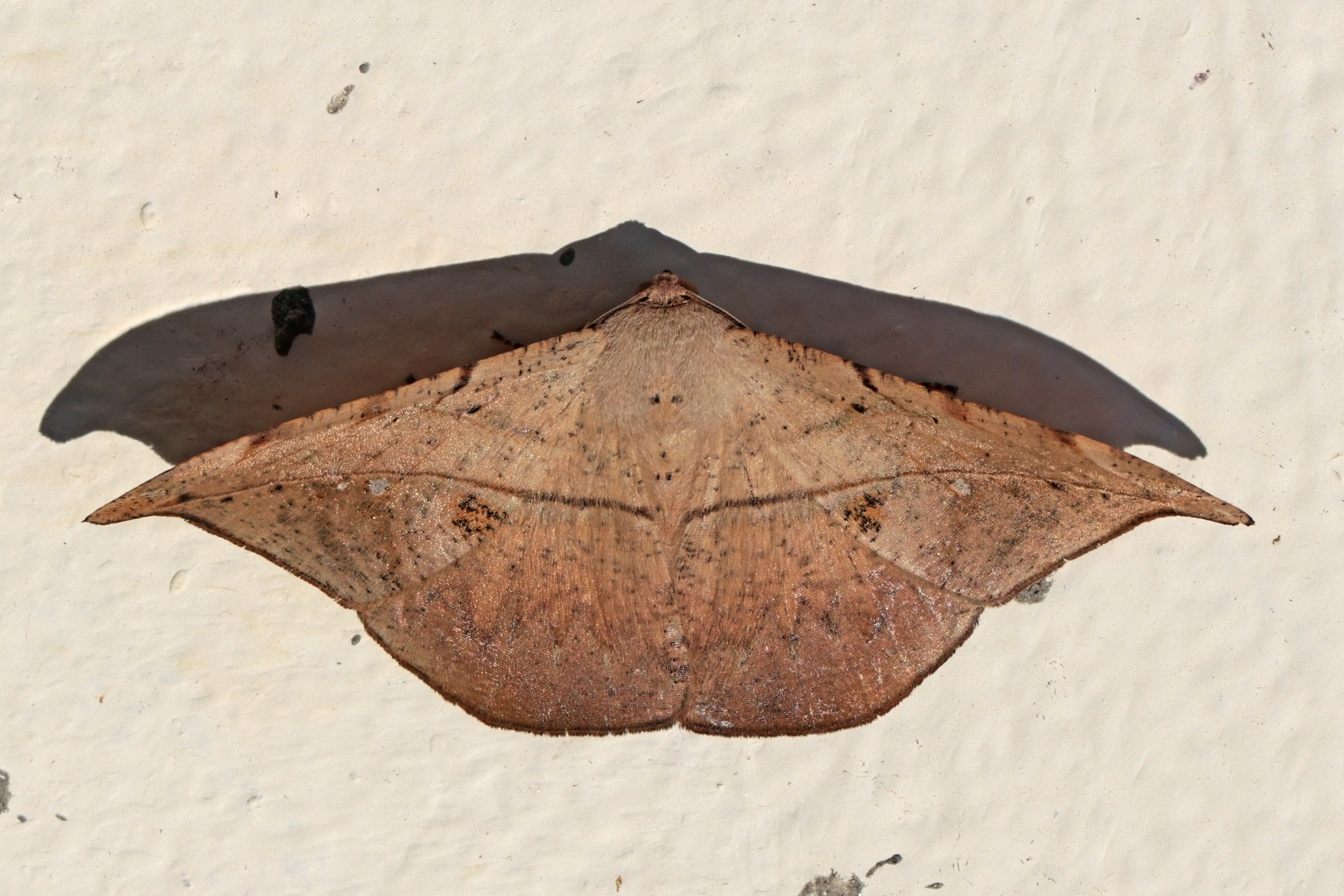
- Spurge spanworm moth O. vesulia Mount Totumas cloud forest, Panama

Scientific classification
- Kingdom: Animalia
- Phylum: Arthropoda
- Clade: Pancrustacea
- Class: Insecta
- Order: Lepidoptera
- Family: Geometridae
- Genus: Oxydia
- Species: O. vesulia

Binomial name
- Oxydia vesulia (Cramer, 1779)

Synonyms
- Oxydia aromata Druce, 1892; Oxydia vesuliata Guenée in Boisduval and Guenée, 1858

= Oxydia vesulia =

Species of moth

Oxydia vesulia, the spurge spanworm moth, is a species of geometrid moth in the family Geometridae. It is found in the Caribbean Sea, Central America, North America, and South America.

== Subspecies ==
These three subspecies belong to the species Oxydia vesulia:

- Oxydia vesulia alternata Warren, 1905
- Oxydia vesulia transponens Walker, 1860
- Oxydia vesulia vesulia (Cramer, 1779)
