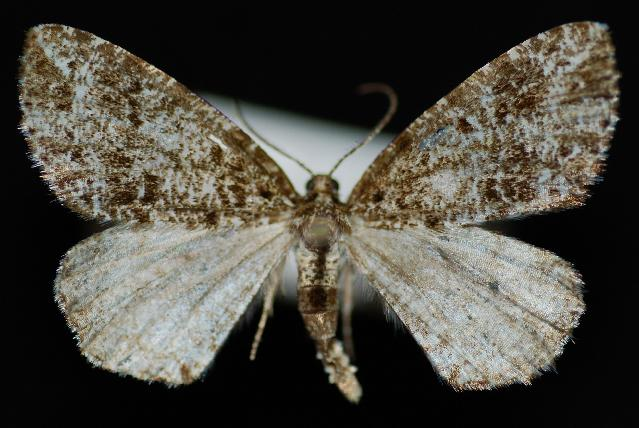

Scientific classification
- Kingdom: Animalia
- Phylum: Arthropoda
- Class: Insecta
- Order: Lepidoptera
- Family: Geometridae
- Genus: Orthofidonia
- Species: O. exornata

Binomial name
- Orthofidonia exornata (Walker, 1862)

= Orthofidonia exornata =

Species of moth

Orthofidonia exornata is a species of geometrid moth in the family Geometridae first described by Francis Walker in 1862. It is found in North America.

The MONA or Hodges number for Orthofidonia exornata is 6429.
