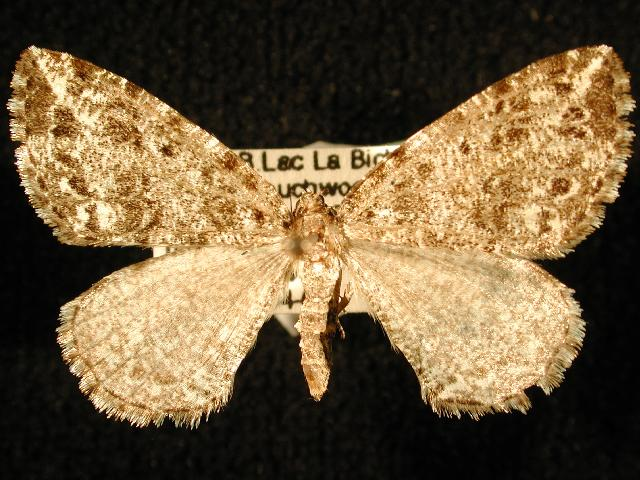
- Orthofidonia tinctaria

Scientific classification
- Kingdom: Animalia
- Phylum: Arthropoda
- Class: Insecta
- Order: Lepidoptera
- Family: Geometridae
- Genus: Orthofidonia
- Species: O. tinctaria

Binomial name
- Orthofidonia tinctaria (Walker, 1860)

= Orthofidonia tinctaria =

Species of insect (moth)

Orthofidonia tinctaria, the marbled wave, is a species of geometrid moth in the family Geometridae. It is found in North America.

The MONA or Hodges number for Orthofidonia tinctaria is 6428.
