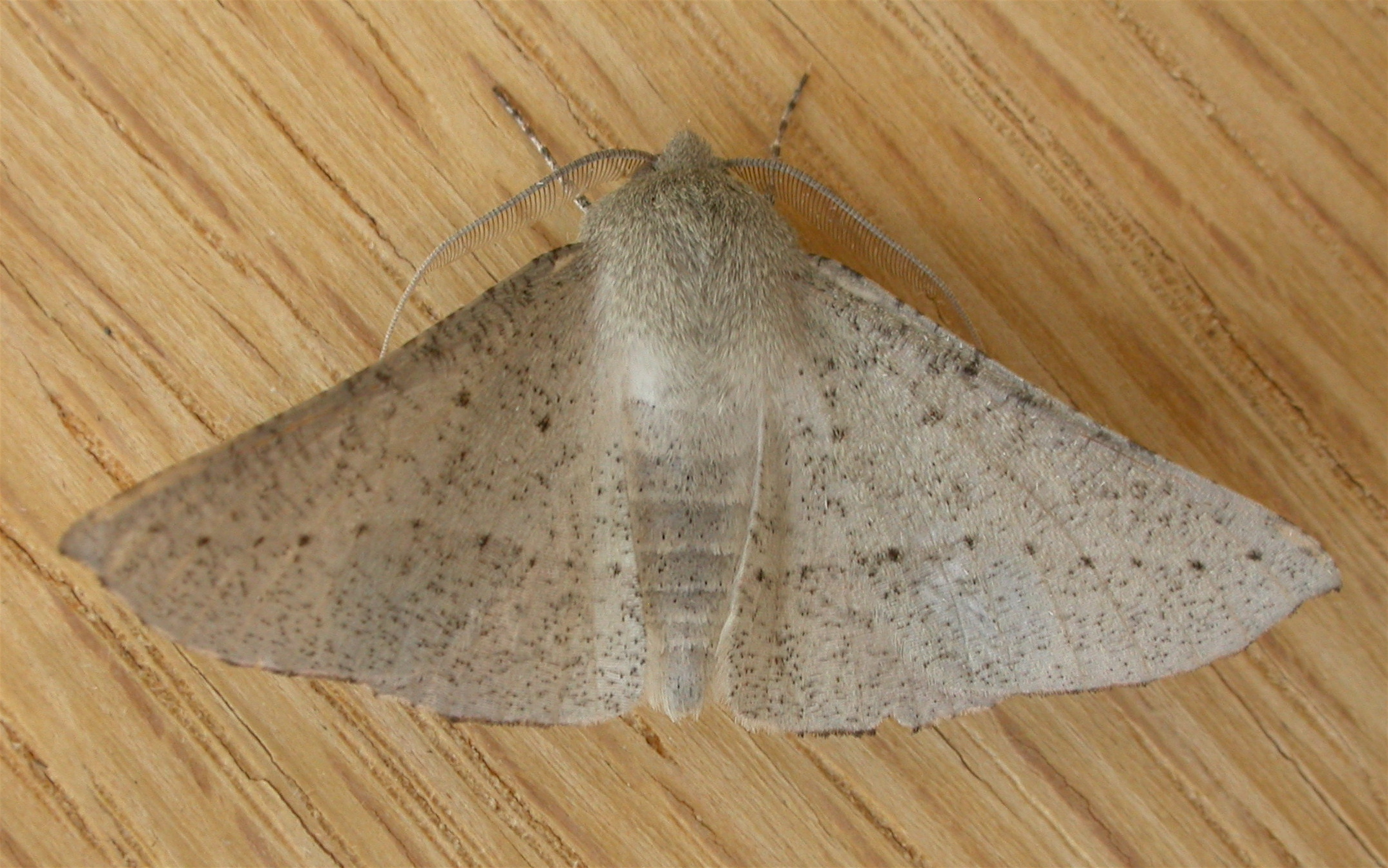

Scientific classification
- Kingdom: Animalia
- Phylum: Arthropoda
- Class: Insecta
- Order: Lepidoptera
- Family: Geometridae
- Genus: Oenochroma
- Species: O. subustaria

Binomial name
- Oenochroma subustaria (Walker, 1860)

Synonyms
- Phallaria subustaria Walker, 1860; Monoctophora caprina Lucas, 1900

= Oenochroma subustaria =

Species of moth

Oenochroma subustaria, also known as the grey wine moth, is a species of moth of the family Geometridae. It is found in Australia, including Tasmania.
