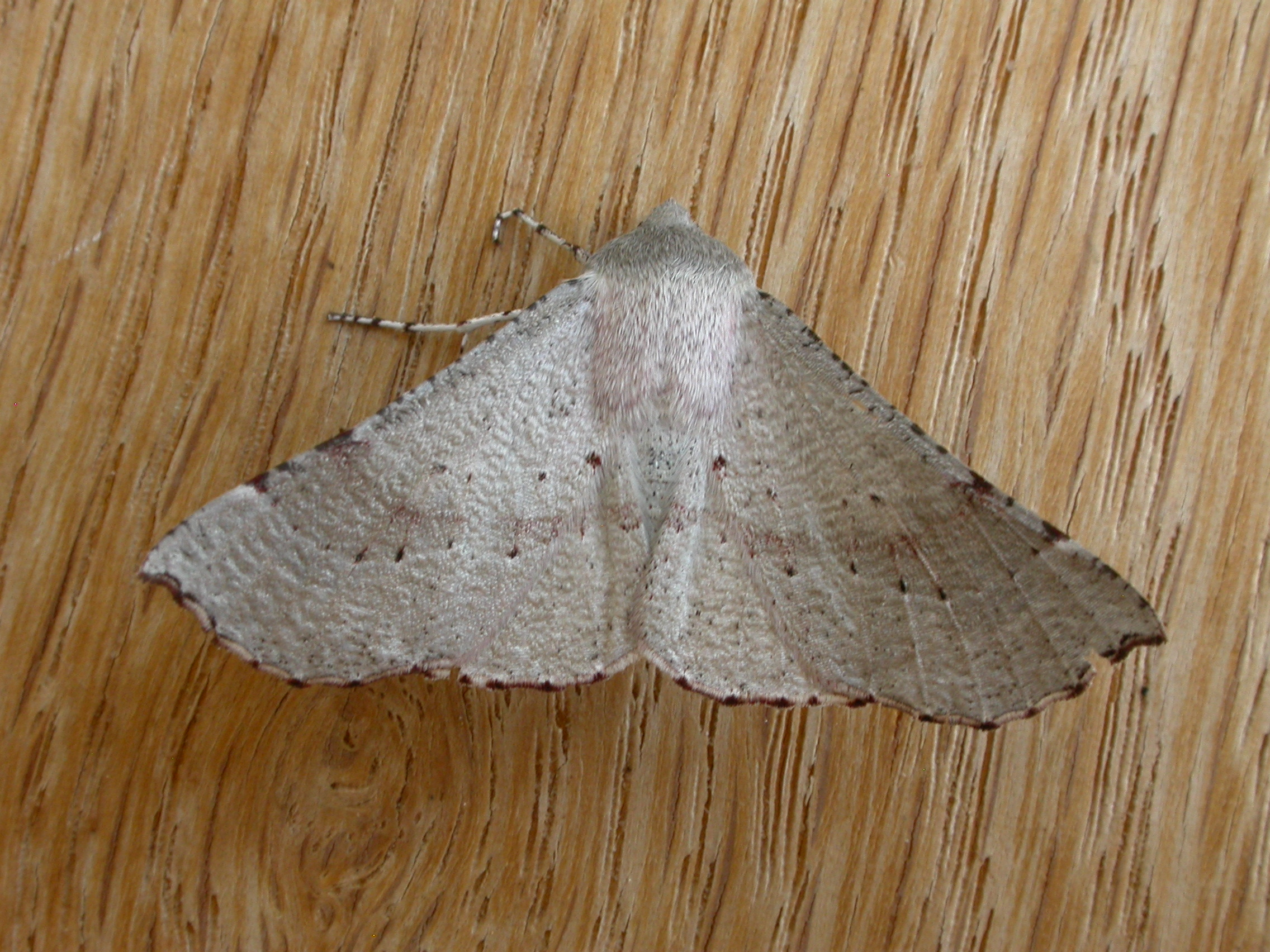

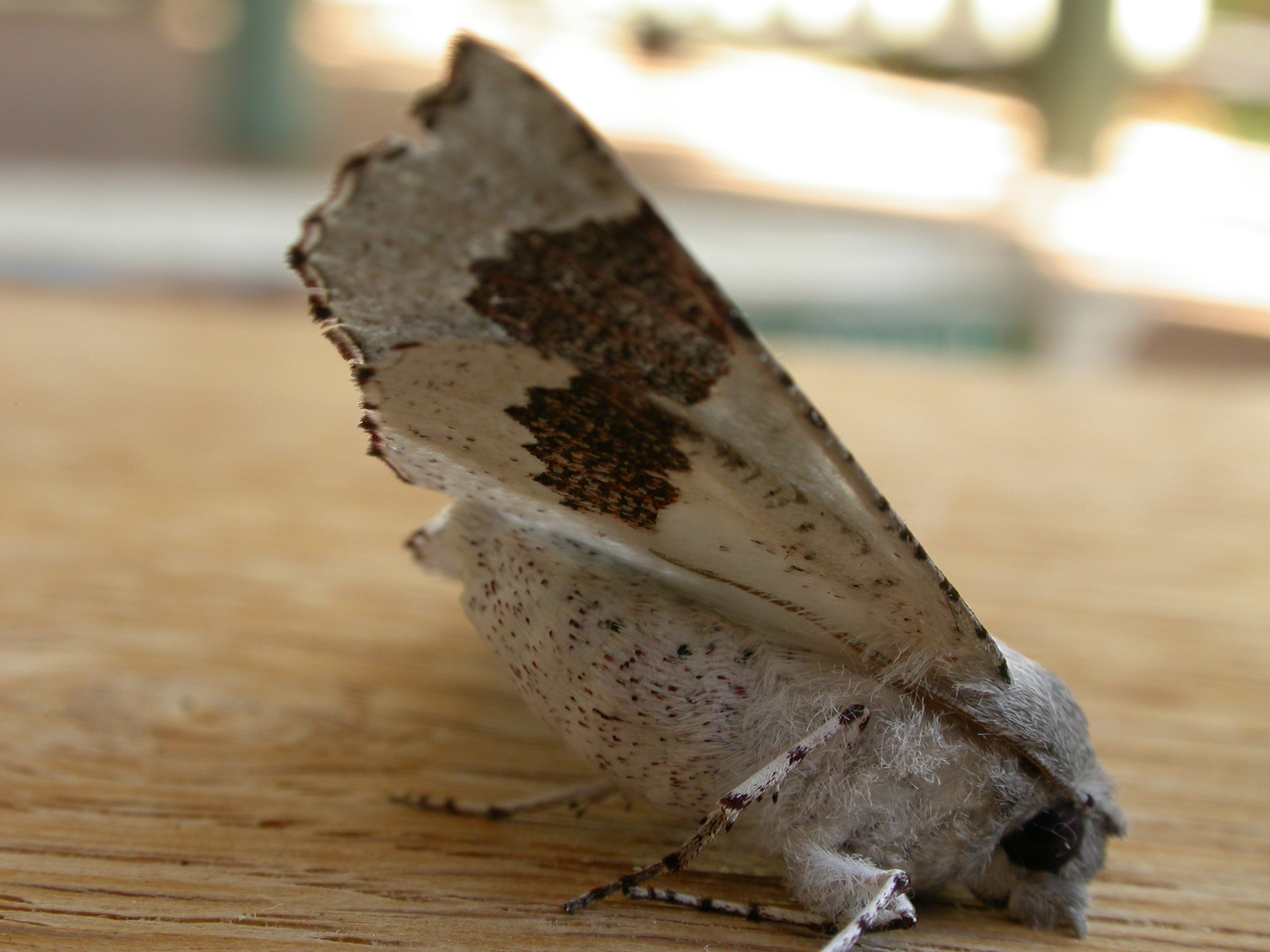

Scientific classification
- Kingdom: Animalia
- Phylum: Arthropoda
- Class: Insecta
- Order: Lepidoptera
- Family: Geometridae
- Genus: Oenochroma
- Species: O. privata

Binomial name
- Oenochroma privata (Walker, 1860)

Synonyms
- Hypographa privata Walker, 1860; Monoctenia hypotaeniaria Guenée, 1864

= Oenochroma privata =

Species of moth

Oenochroma privata is a moth of the family Geometridae first described by Francis Walker in 1860. It is known from Australia.
