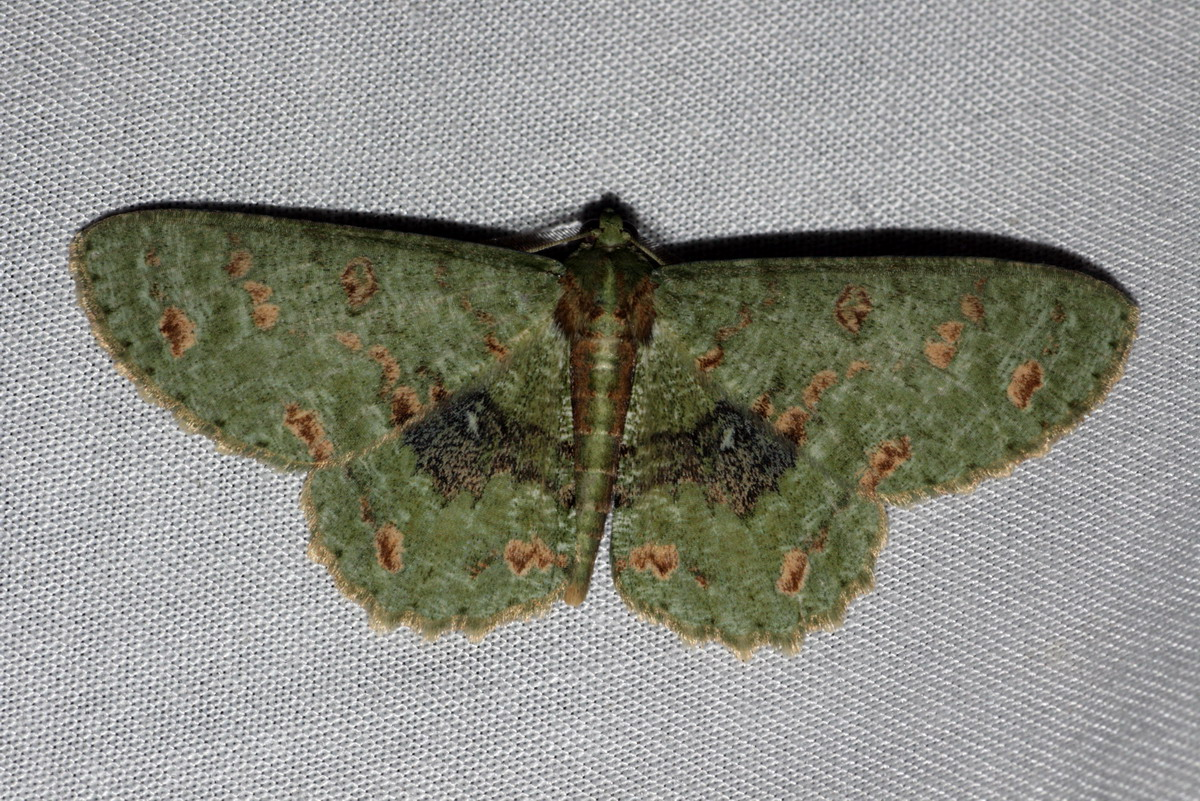

Scientific classification
- Kingdom: Animalia
- Phylum: Arthropoda
- Clade: Pancrustacea
- Class: Insecta
- Order: Lepidoptera
- Family: Geometridae
- Genus: Opthalmitis
- Species: O. satoi

Binomial name
- Ophthalmitis satoi Holloway, 1993

= Ophthalmitis satoi =

Species of moth

Ophthalmitis satoi is a moth of the family Geometridae first described by Jeremy Daniel Holloway in 1993. It is found in Borneo.

Its wingspan is 26–29 mm.
