= Ophthalmitis caritaria =

Scientific classification
- Kingdom: Animalia
- Phylum: Arthropoda
- Class: Insecta
- Order: Lepidoptera
- Family: Geometridae
- Genus: Opthalmitis
- Species: O. caritaria

Binomial name
- Ophthalmitis caritaria Walker, 1860

Species of moth

Ophthalmitis caritaria is a moth of the family Geometridae first described by Francis Walker in 1860. It is found in Sri Lanka.
