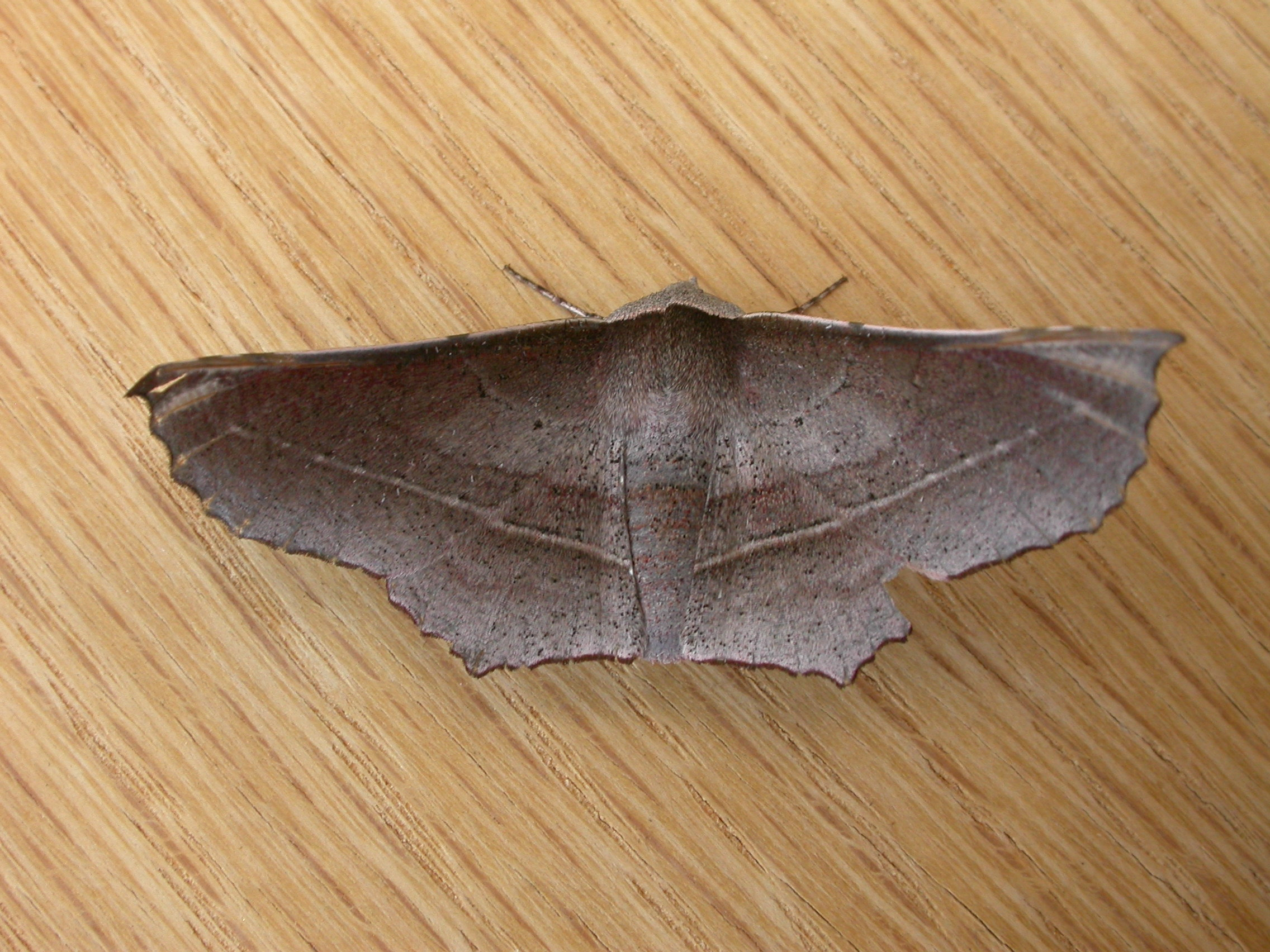

Scientific classification
- Kingdom: Animalia
- Phylum: Arthropoda
- Class: Insecta
- Order: Lepidoptera
- Family: Geometridae
- Genus: Oenochroma
- Species: O. vetustaria

Binomial name
- Oenochroma vetustaria (Walker, 1860)

Synonyms
- Monoctenia digglesaria Guenée, 1864; Balliace vetustaria Walker, 1860

= Oenochroma vetustaria =

Species of moth

Oenochroma vetustaria, the ribbed wine moth, is a species of moth of the family Geometridae. It is found in South Eastern Australia.
