= Oxydia cubana =

Scientific classification
- Domain: Eukaryota
- Kingdom: Animalia
- Phylum: Arthropoda
- Class: Insecta
- Order: Lepidoptera
- Family: Geometridae
- Genus: Oxydia
- Species: O. cubana

Binomial name
- Oxydia cubana (Warren, 1906)

Synonyms
- Microgonia cubana Warren, 1906

Species of moth

Oxydia cubana, the Cuban spanworm moth, is a species of geometrid moth in the family Geometridae. It is found in the Caribbean and North America.

The MONA or Hodges number for Oxydia cubana is 6968.
