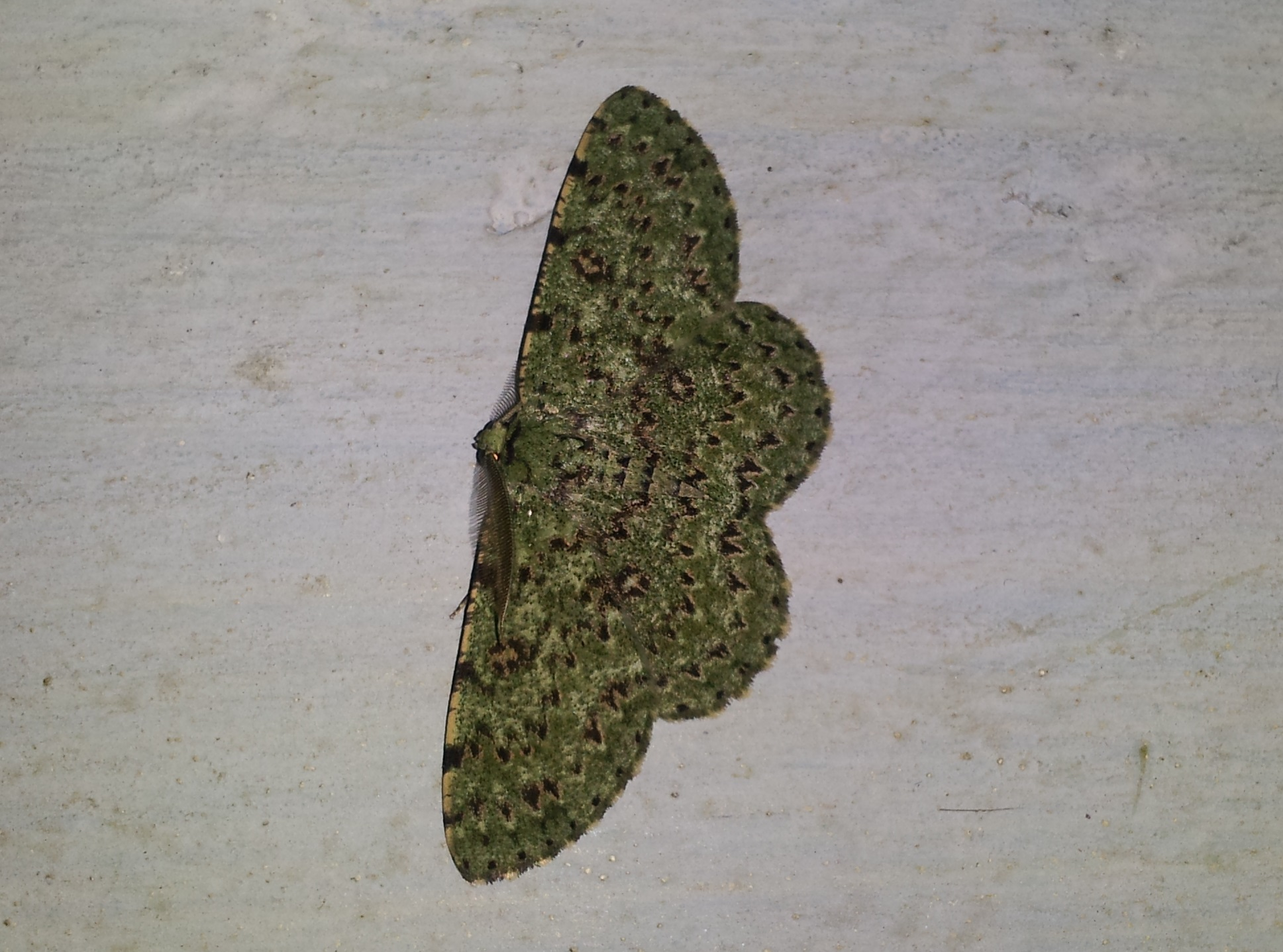

Scientific classification
- Kingdom: Animalia
- Phylum: Arthropoda
- Class: Insecta
- Order: Lepidoptera
- Family: Geometridae
- Genus: Opthalmitis
- Species: O. herbidaria

Binomial name
- Ophthalmitis herbidaria (Guenée, 1858)

Synonyms
- Ophthalmodes herbidaria Guenée, 1857

= Ophthalmitis herbidaria =

Species of moth

Ophthalmitis herbidaria is a moth of the family Geometridae first described by Achille Guenée in 1858. It is found in China, India, Sri Lanka, Nepal, Hong Kong and Taiwan.

== Description ==
The wingspan of the adult is 36 mm. Its ground colour varies from grass green, grey green to yellowish green with black irrorations (speckles). Its abdomen has paired black dorsal specks. Forewings with black lines at waved antemedial and dentate medial, post-medial and submarginal areas. Hindwings also with black lines at medial and submarginal areas. Both wings with marginal series of black specks. Underside is with large spot at end of cell of each wing. Host plants of the caterpillar include Diospyros and Casearia species.
