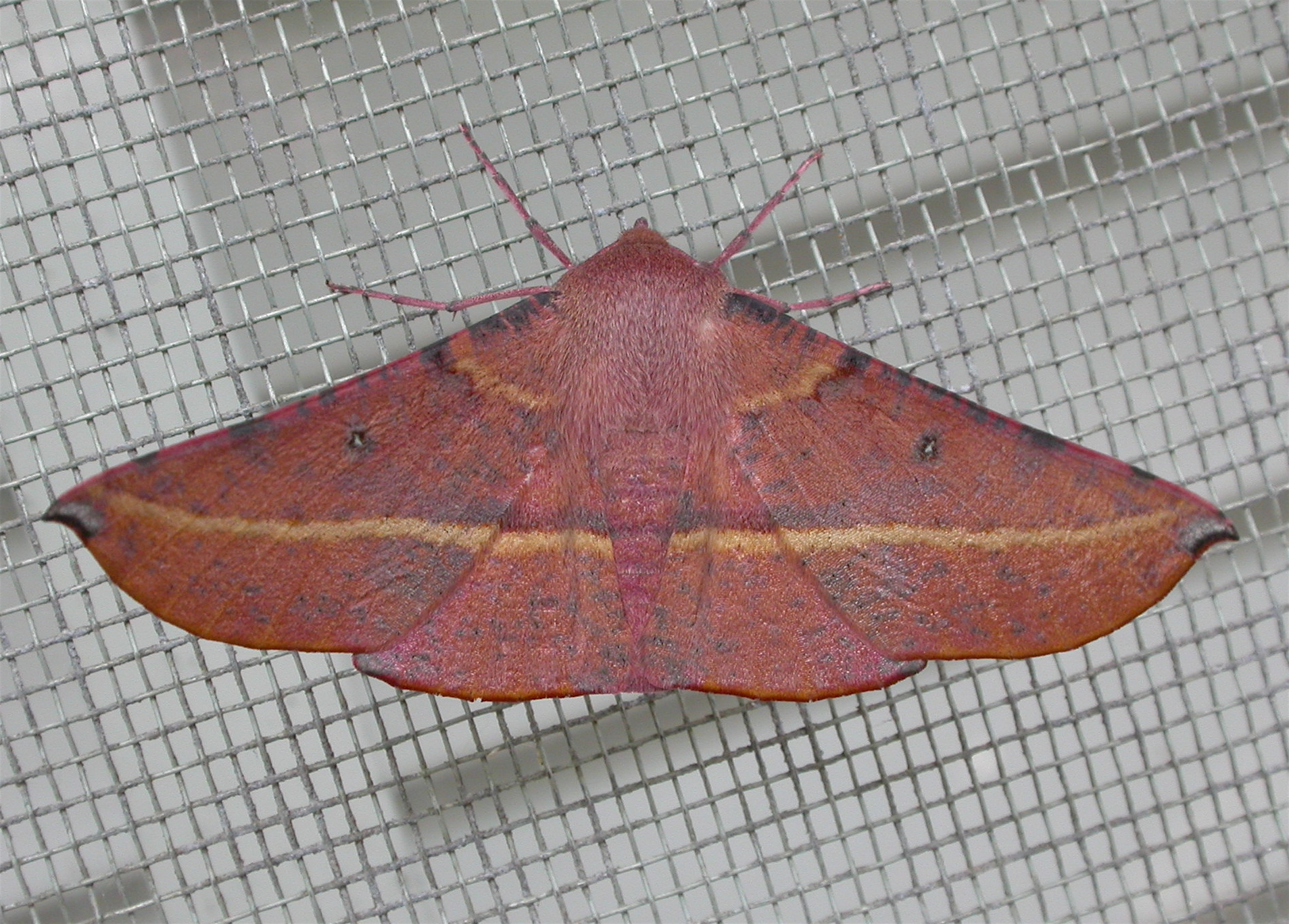

Scientific classification
- Kingdom: Animalia
- Phylum: Arthropoda
- Class: Insecta
- Order: Lepidoptera
- Family: Geometridae
- Genus: Oenochroma
- Species: O. vinaria

Binomial name
- Oenochroma vinaria Guenée, 1857

= Oenochroma vinaria =

Species of moth

Oenochroma vinaria, the pink-bellied moth, is a moth of the family Geometridae. It is found in most of Australia.

The wingspan is 50–70 mm.

The larvae feed on Grevillea, Banksia and Hakea species.
