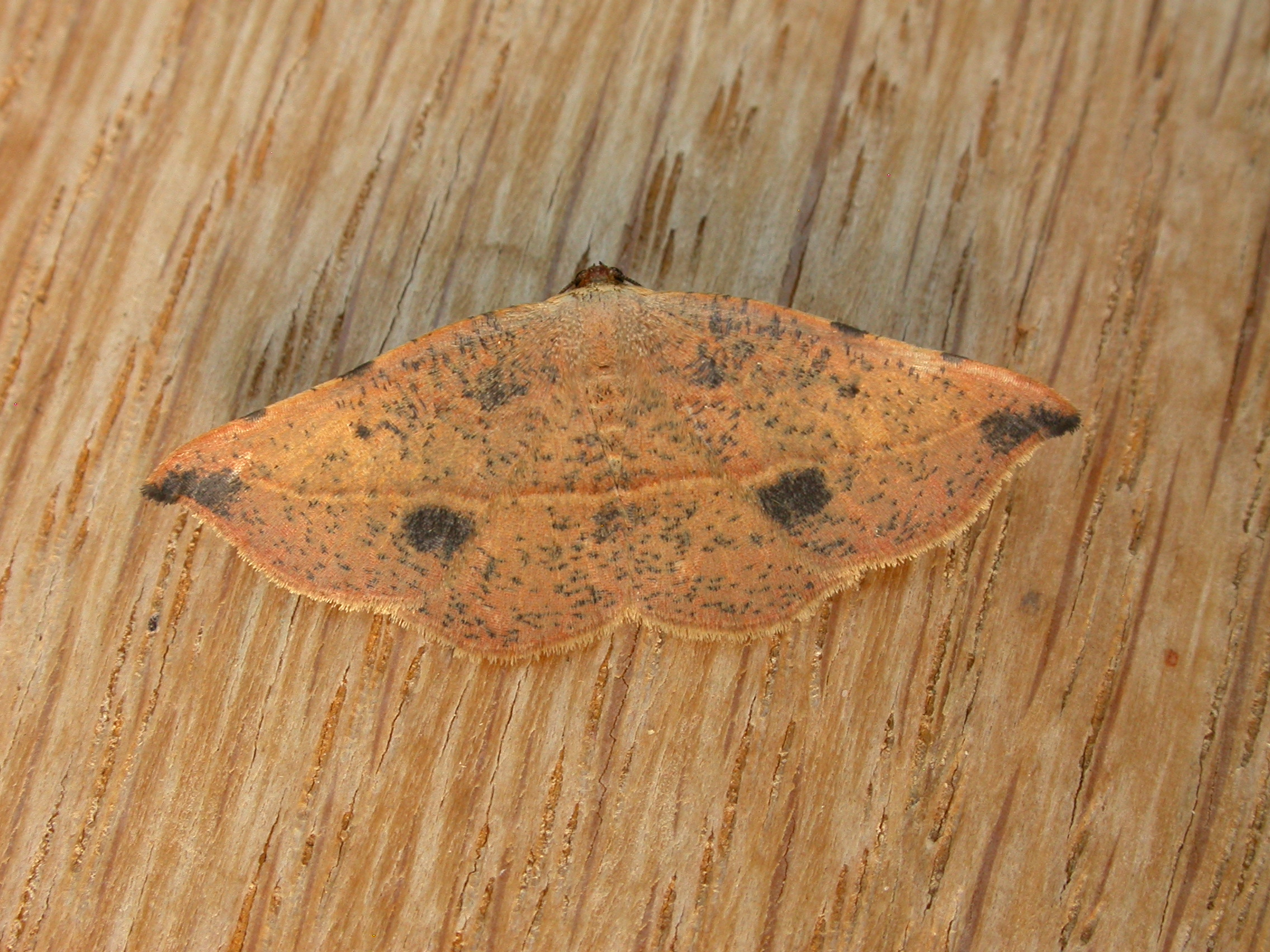

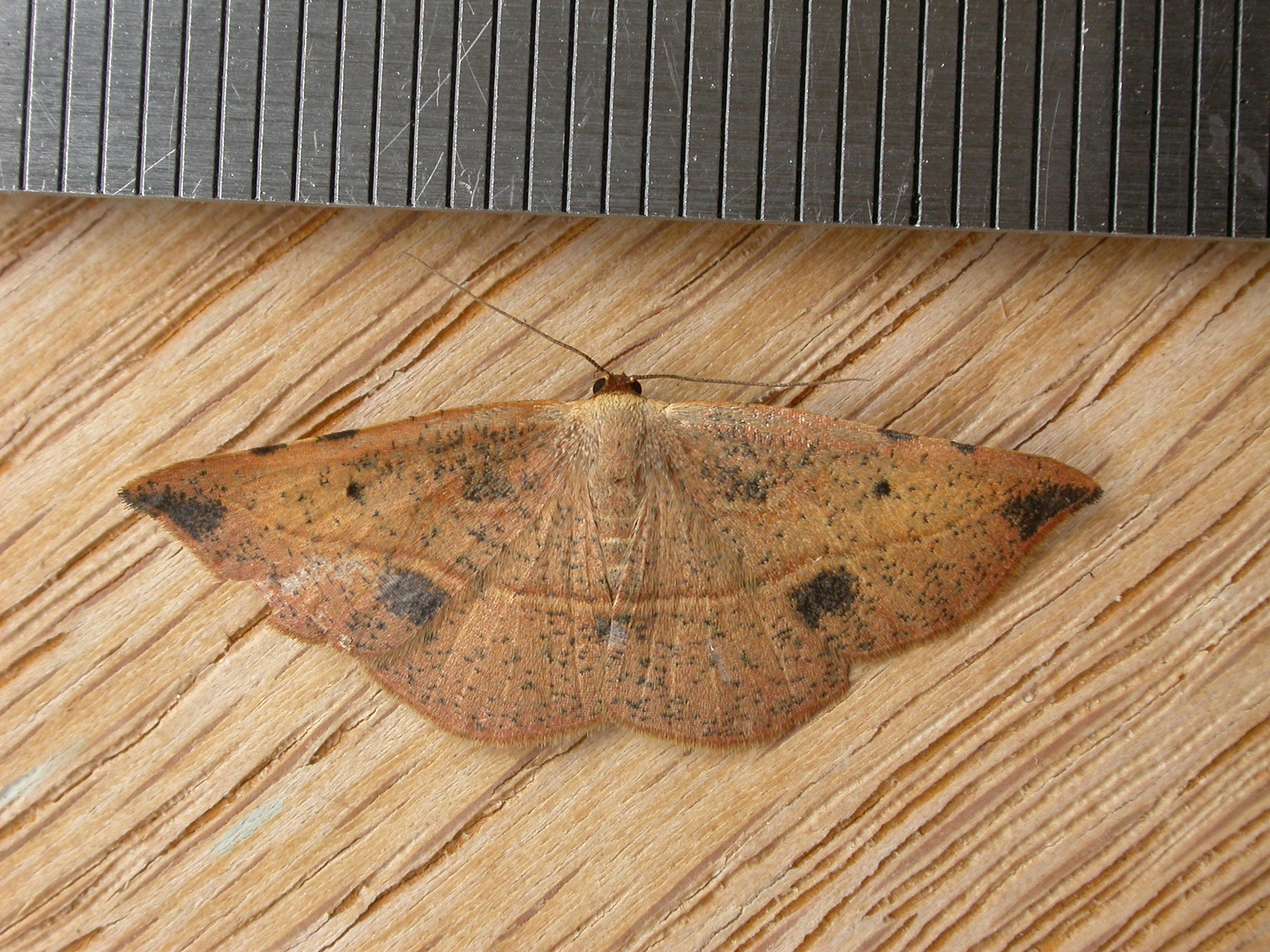

Scientific classification
- Kingdom: Animalia
- Phylum: Arthropoda
- Class: Insecta
- Order: Lepidoptera
- Family: Geometridae
- Genus: Onycodes
- Species: O. traumataria

Binomial name
- Onycodes traumataria Guenée, 1857

Synonyms
- Chilma flagrantaria Walker, 1863

= Onycodes traumataria =

Species of moth

Onycodes traumataria is a species of moth of the family Geometridae first described by Achille Guenée in 1857. It is found in the Australia, including New South Wales and Tasmania.
