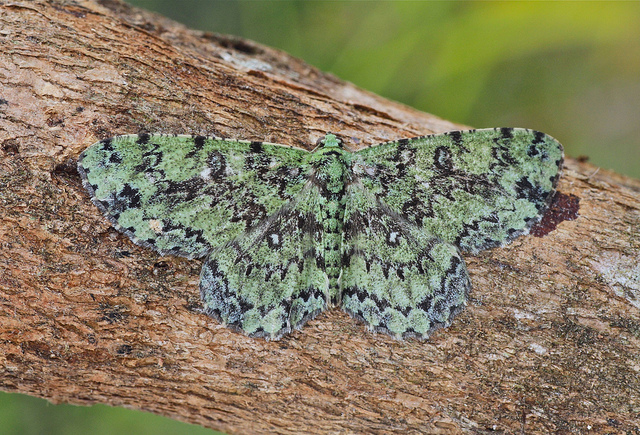
- Borneo, Trusmadi area, hill dipterocarp forest

Scientific classification
- Kingdom: Animalia
- Phylum: Arthropoda
- Clade: Pancrustacea
- Class: Insecta
- Order: Lepidoptera
- Family: Geometridae
- Genus: Opthalmitis
- Species: O. viridior

Binomial name
- Ophthalmitis viridior Holloway, 1993

= Ophthalmitis viridior =

Species of moth

Ophthalmitis viridior is a moth in the family Geometridae first described by Jeremy Daniel Holloway in 1993. It is found in Borneo and Peninsular Malaysia.

The wingspan is 22–26 mm for males.
