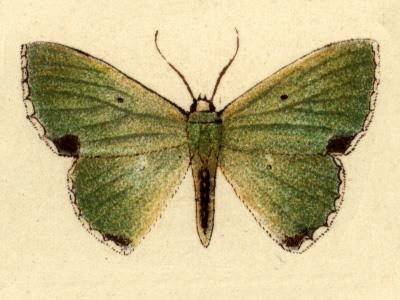

Scientific classification
- Domain: Eukaryota
- Kingdom: Animalia
- Phylum: Arthropoda
- Class: Insecta
- Order: Lepidoptera
- Family: Geometridae
- Genus: Oospila
- Species: O. confundaria

Binomial name
- Oospila confundaria (Moschler, 1890)

Synonyms
- Racheospila confundaria Moschler, 1890; Oospila aphenges Prout, 1932; Oospila coerulea aphenges; Racheolopha coerulea Warren, 1906; Racheolopha derasa Warren, 1906; Oospila sesquiplaga Prout, 1912

= Oospila confundaria =

Species of moth

Oospila confundaria is a moth of the family Geometridae first described by Heinrich Benno Möschler in 1890. It is found from Guatemala to Brazil and on the Greater and Lesser Antilles.
