= Orthofidonia flavivenata =

Scientific classification
- Domain: Eukaryota
- Kingdom: Animalia
- Phylum: Arthropoda
- Class: Insecta
- Order: Lepidoptera
- Family: Geometridae
- Genus: Orthofidonia
- Species: O. flavivenata

Binomial name
- Orthofidonia flavivenata (Hulst, 1898)

Species of moth

Orthofidonia flavivenata, the yellow-veined geometer moth, is a species of geometrid moth in the family Geometridae. It is found in North America.

The MONA or Hodges number for Orthofidonia flavivenata is 6430.
