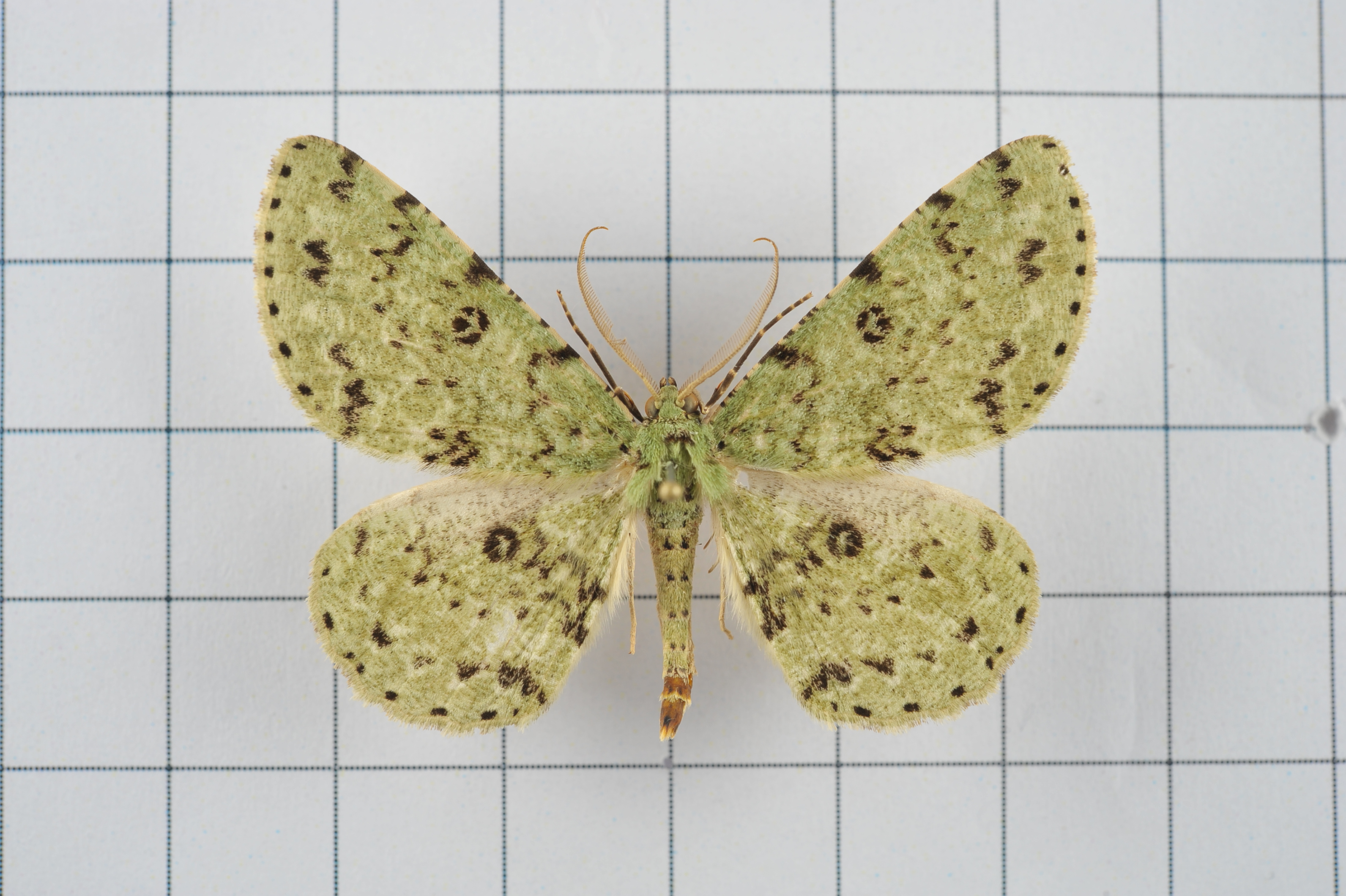

Scientific classification
- Kingdom: Animalia
- Phylum: Arthropoda
- Class: Insecta
- Order: Lepidoptera
- Family: Geometridae
- Genus: Opthalmitis
- Species: O. sinensium

Binomial name
- Ophthalmitis sinensium (Oberthür, 1913)

Synonyms
- Ophthalmodes sinensium Oberthür, 1913; (Ophthalmodes) sinensium Prout, 1915; Boarmia (Ophthalmodes) sinensium var. abundantior Wehrli, 1943; Boarmia (Ophthalmodes) sinensium hypophayla Wehrli, 1943; Ophthalmitis lushanaria Sato, 1992; Ophthalmitis sinensium Parsons et al., 1999

= Ophthalmitis sinensium =

Species of moth

Ophthalmitis sinensium is a moth of the family Geometridae first described by Oberthür in 1913. It is found in China, India, Vietnam, Thailand and probably in Sri Lanka.

Its wings are greenish. Hindwing medial line is close to the inner margin of the discal spot. In male genitalia, the uncus has only one pair of lateral processes.
