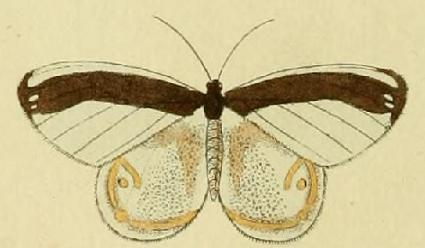

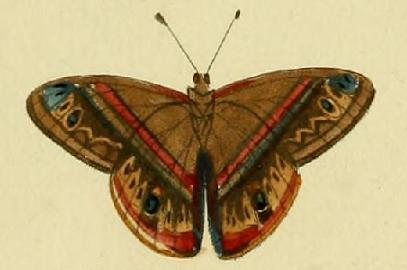

Scientific classification
- Kingdom: Animalia
- Phylum: Arthropoda
- Class: Insecta
- Order: Lepidoptera
- Family: Geometridae
- Genus: Opisthoxia
- Species: O. amabilis

Binomial name
- Opisthoxia amabilis (Cramer, 1777)

Synonyms
- Phalaena amabilis Cramer, 1777; Opisthoxia amabilaria Hubner, 1825; Ophthalmophora amabiliata Guenee, 1858

= Opisthoxia amabilis =

Species of moth

Opisthoxia amabilis is a moth of the family Geometridae first described by Pieter Cramer in 1777. It is found in Suriname.

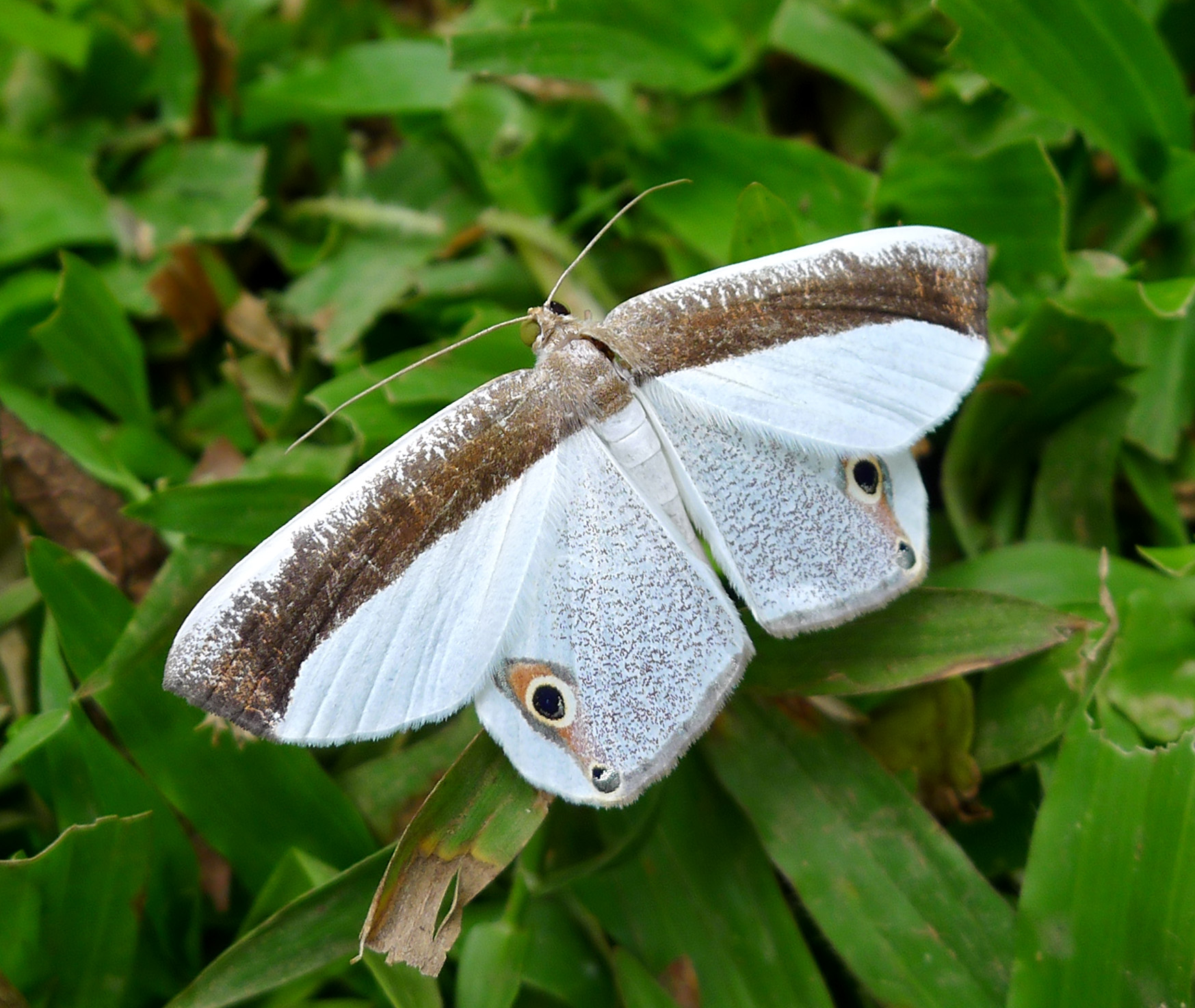
