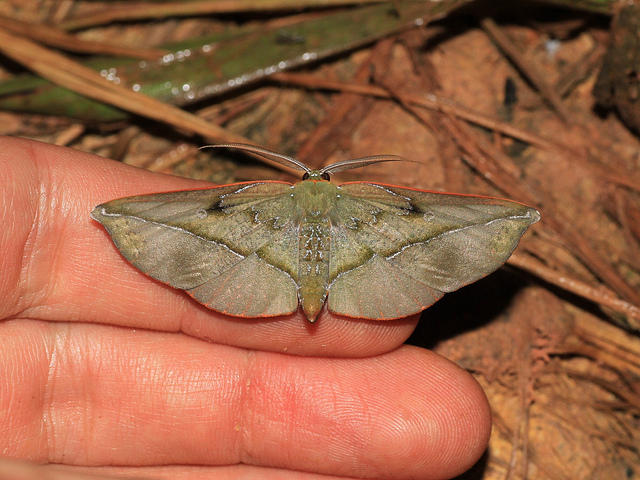
- Male from Borneo

Scientific classification
- Kingdom: Animalia
- Phylum: Arthropoda
- Class: Insecta
- Order: Lepidoptera
- Family: Geometridae
- Genus: Omiza
- Species: O. lycoraria

Binomial name
- Omiza lycoraria (Guenée, 1857)

Synonyms
- Hypochrosis lycoraria Guenée, 1857; Hypochrosis jasminaria Guenée, 1857; Decetia hypopyrata Snellen, 1895; Hypochrosis languidata Swinhoe, 1902

= Omiza lycoraria =

Species of moth

Omiza lycoraria is a geometer moth in subfamily Ennominae first described by Achille Guenée in 1857. It is found in Peninsular Malaysia, Borneo and Sumatra. The species is most common in lowland forests but may be found in lower and upper montane forests up to about 1800 m.

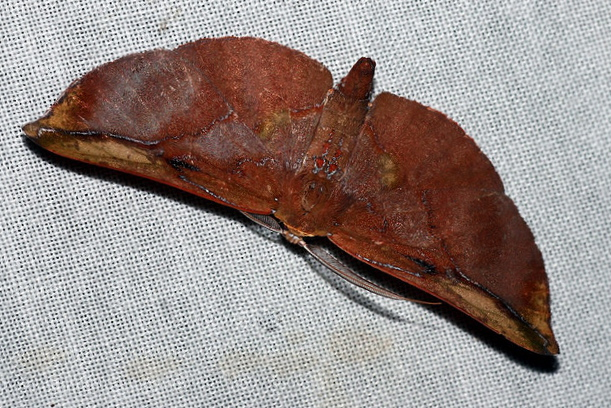
Female of typical brown form

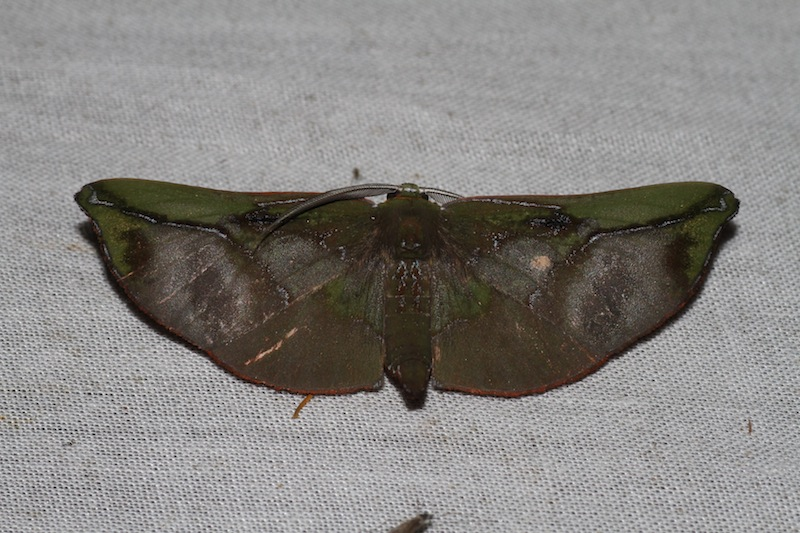
Female of green form
