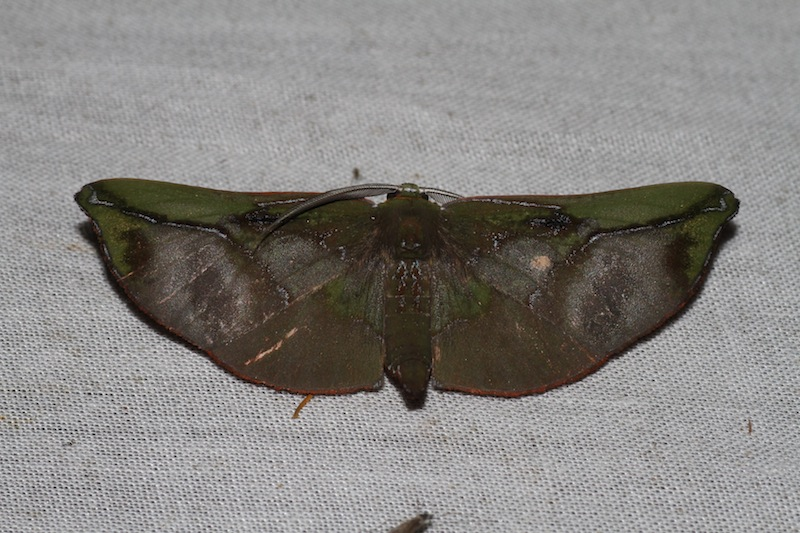
- Male Omiza lycoraria, Borneo

Scientific classification
- Kingdom: Animalia
- Phylum: Arthropoda
- Class: Insecta
- Order: Lepidoptera
- Family: Geometridae
- Subfamily: Ennominae
- Genus: Omiza; Walker, 1860

= Omiza =

Genus of moths

Omiza is a genus of moths in the family Geometridae erected by Francis Walker in 1860.

== Species ==
- Omiza herois (Prout, 1932)
- Omiza lycoraria (Guenée, 1857)
- Omiza miliaria Swinhoe, 1889
- Omiza pachiaria Walker, 1860
