= Orgyiodes =

Scientific classification
- Kingdom: Animalia
- Phylum: Arthropoda
- Clade: Pancrustacea
- Class: Insecta
- Order: Lepidoptera
- Family: Geometridae
- Subfamily: Ennominae
- Genus: Orgyiodes; Felder, 1874

Genus of moths

Orgyiodes is a genus of moths in the family geometridae.

Species within Orgyiodes are primarily found in Africa, with a notable presence in Southern Africa.
