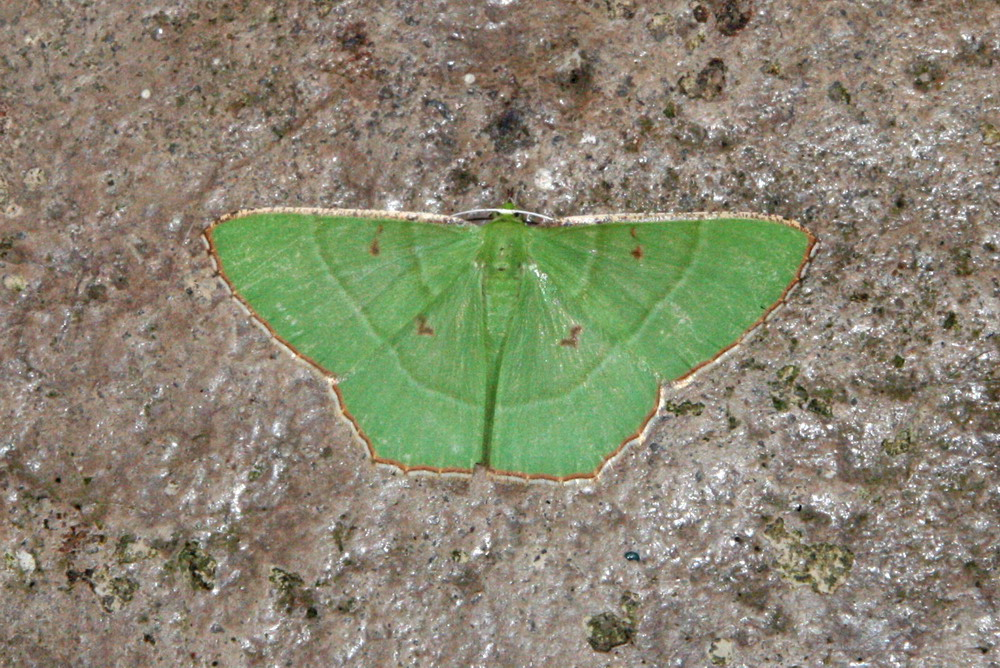

Scientific classification
- Kingdom: Animalia
- Phylum: Arthropoda
- Clade: Pancrustacea
- Class: Insecta
- Order: Lepidoptera
- Family: Geometridae
- Genus: Ornithospila; Warren, 1894

Synonyms
- Urospila Warren, 1894; Afrena Hampson, 1895

= Ornithospila =

Genus of moths

Ornithospila is a genus of moths in the family Geometridae described by Warren in 1894.

== Species ==
- Ornithospila viridimargo Prout southern Moluccas
- Ornithospila avicularia (Guenée, 1857) Sikkim, Bhutan
- Ornithospila bipunctata Prout, 1916 Peninsular Malaysia, Sumatra, Borneo, Natuna Islands, Philippines, Sulawesi
- Ornithospila carteronae Herbulot Moluccas
- Ornithospila submonstrans (Walker, 1861) Peninsular Malaysia, Sumatra, Borneo, Philippines
- Ornithospila sundaensis Holloway, 1976 Peninsular Malaysia, Sumatra, Borneo
- Ornithospila cincta (Walker, 1861) Peninsular Malaysia, Sumatra, Borneo
- Ornithospila succincta Prout, 1917 Peninsular Malaysia, Sumatra, Borneo, Philippines, New Guinea
- Ornithospila lineata (Moore, 1872) Sri Lanka, north-eastern Himalayas, Vietnam, Burma, Borneo, Sumatra
- Ornithospila esmeralda (Hampson, 1895) north-eastern Himalayas, Sundaland, Philippines
