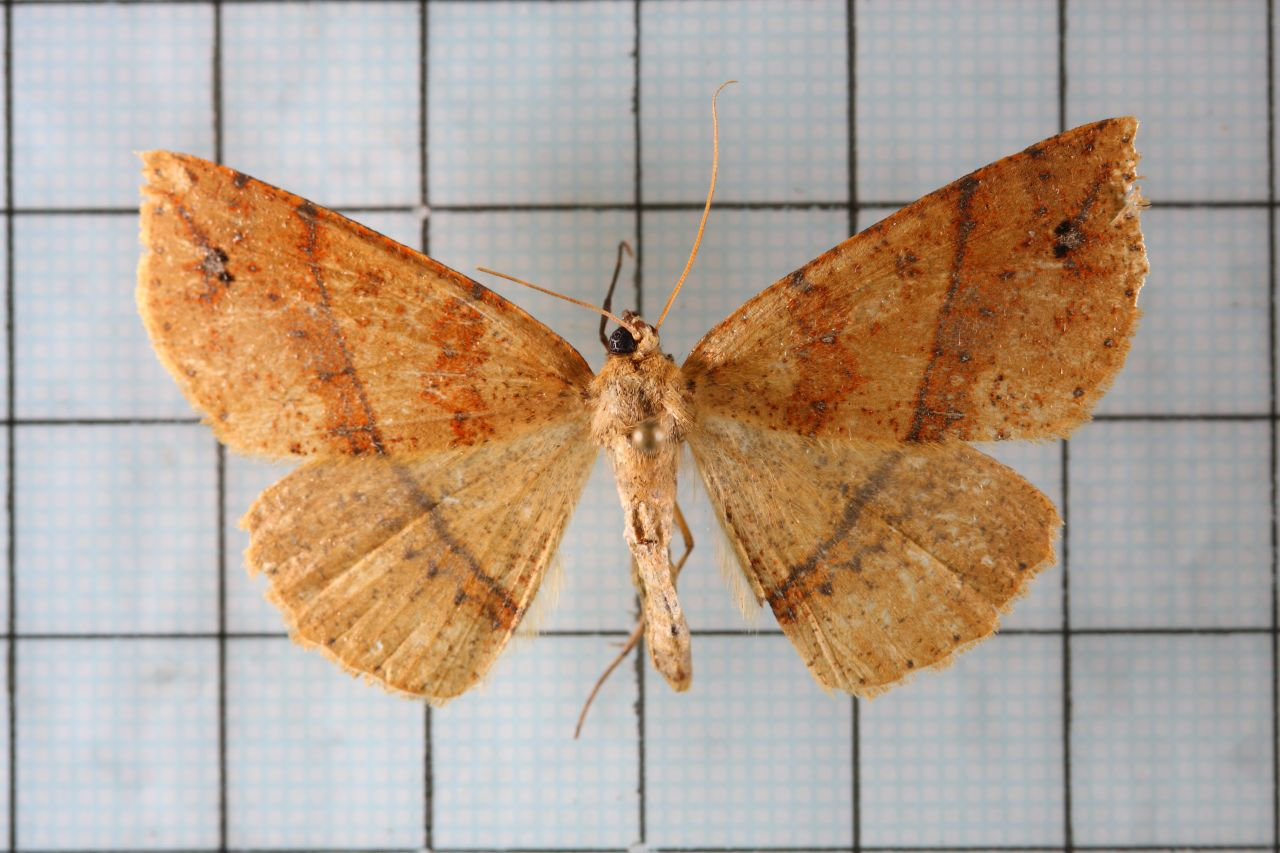
- Psyra spurcataria

Scientific classification
- Kingdom: Animalia
- Phylum: Arthropoda
- Class: Insecta
- Order: Lepidoptera
- Family: Geometridae
- Subfamily: Ennominae
- Genus: Psyra; Walker, 1860

Synonyms
- Oncodocnemis Rebel, 1901; Orbasia Swinhoe, 1894

= Psyra (moth) =

Genus of moths

Psyra is a genus of moths in the family Geometridae.

== Species ==
- Psyra angulifera (Walker, 1866)
- Psyra bluethgeni (Pungeler, 1904)
- Psyra boarmiata (Graeser, 1892)
- Psyra conferta Inoue, 1983
- Psyra crypta Yazaki, 1994
- Psyra cuneata Walker, 1860
- Psyra debilis Warren, 1888
- Psyra falcipennis Yazaki, 1994
- Psyra fulvaria Yazaki, 1992
- Psyra gracilis Yazaki, 1992
- Psyra moderata Inoue, 1982
- Psyra rufolinearia Leech, 1897
- Psyra similaria Moore, 1868
- Psyra spurcataria (Walker, 1863)
- Psyra trilineata (Moore, 1868)
