= Obolcola =

Scientific classification
- Kingdom: Animalia
- Phylum: Arthropoda
- Clade: Pancrustacea
- Class: Insecta
- Order: Lepidoptera
- Family: Geometridae
- Genus: Obolcola; Walker, 1861

Genus of moths

Obolcola is a genus of moths in the family Geometridae erected by Francis Walker in 1861.
