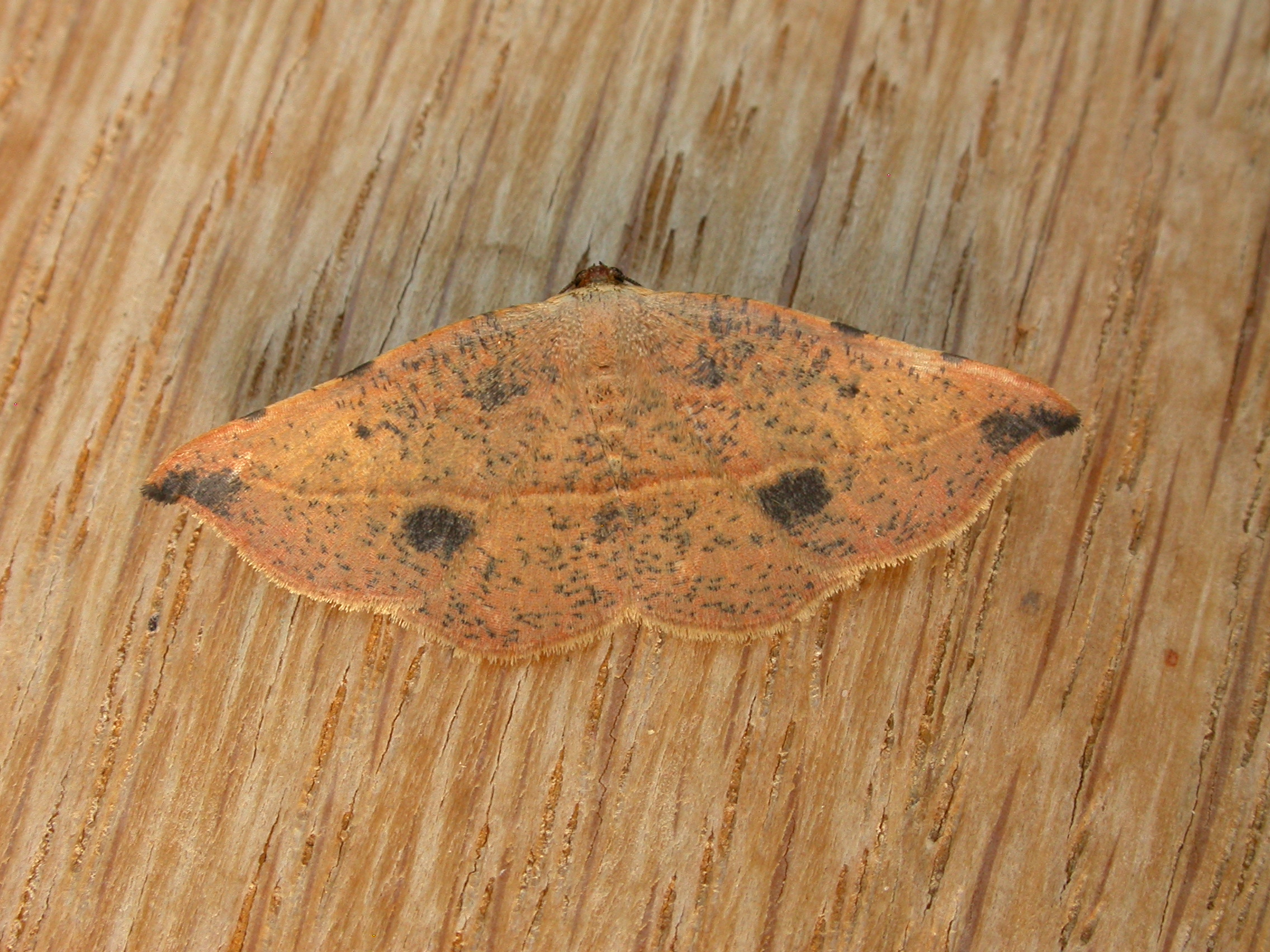
- Onycodes traumataria

Scientific classification
- Kingdom: Animalia
- Phylum: Arthropoda
- Class: Insecta
- Order: Lepidoptera
- Family: Geometridae
- Subfamily: Oenochrominae
- Genus: Onycodes; Guenée, 1857

Synonyms
- Chilma Walker, 1862

= Onycodes =

Genus of moths

Onycodes is a genus of moths in the family Geometridae erected by Achille Guenée in 1857. Both species are known from Australia.

== Species ==
- Onycodes traumataria Guenée, 1857
- Onycodes rubra (Lucas, 1892)
