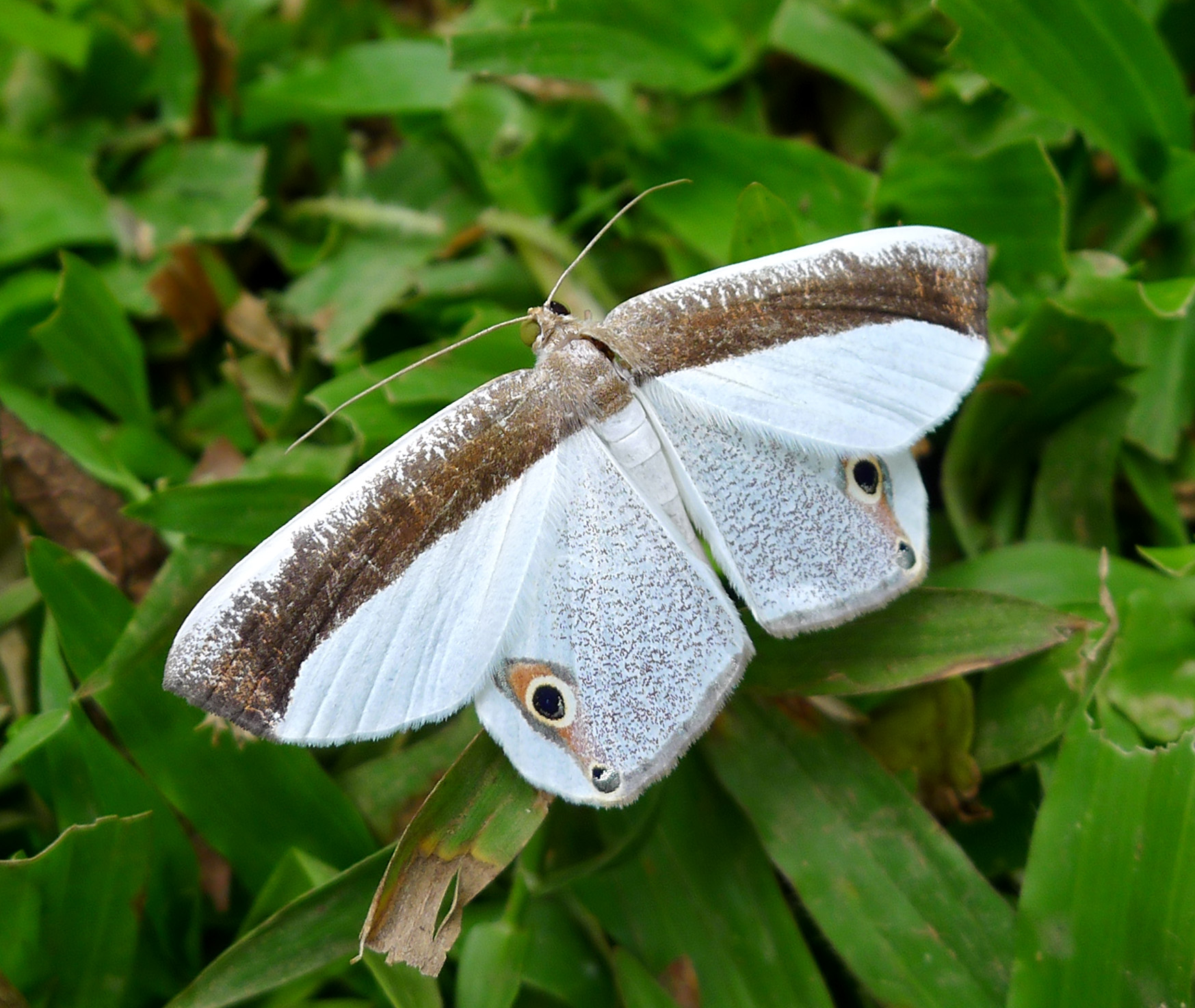
- Opisthoxia amabilis

Scientific classification
- Kingdom: Animalia
- Phylum: Arthropoda
- Clade: Pancrustacea
- Class: Insecta
- Order: Lepidoptera
- Family: Geometridae
- Genus: Opisthoxia; Hübner, 1825

Synonyms
- Argyroplutodes Warren, 1894; Callurapteryx Warren, 1894; Ophthalmophora Guenée, 1857

= Opisthoxia =

Genus of moths

Opisthoxia is a genus of moths in the family Geometridae.

== Species ==
- Opisthoxia albanaria (Oberthür, 1916)
- Opisthoxia alectaria (Guenée, 1857)
- Opisthoxia amabilis (Cramer, 1777)
- Opisthoxia amphiaria (Oberthür, 1916)
- Opisthoxia amphissaria (Oberthür, 1916)
- Opisthoxia amphistrataria (Oberthür, 1916)
- Opisthoxia archidiaria (Oberthür, 1916)
- Opisthoxia argenticincta Warren, 1905
- Opisthoxia asopis (Druce, 1892)
- Opisthoxia aspledon (Druce, 1892)
- Opisthoxia aurelia Dognin, 1903
- Opisthoxia bella (Butler, 1881)
- Opisthoxia bellaoides (Dognin, 1894)
- Opisthoxia bimaculata (Warren, 1907)
- Opisthoxia bolivari (Oberthür, 1916)
- Opisthoxia bracteata (Butler, 1885)
- Opisthoxia branickiaria (Oberthür, 1883)
- Opisthoxia cabima (Schaus, 1923)
- Opisthoxia cassandra Dyar, 1912
- Opisthoxia casta Warren, 1904
- Opisthoxia ceres (Oberthür, 1916)
- Opisthoxia chouya (Thierry-Mieg, 1905)
- Opisthoxia claudiaria Schaus, 1901
- Opisthoxia cluana (Druce, 1900)
- Opisthoxia columbaria (E. D. Jones, 1921)
- Opisthoxia conjuncta (Herbulot, 1988)
- Opisthoxia consequa (Warren, 1909)
- Opisthoxia contrariata (Warren, 1904)
- Opisthoxia corinnaria (Guenée, 1858)
- Opisthoxia corinnoides (Thierry-Mieg, 1916)
- Opisthoxia crepuscularia (Warren, 1907)
- Opisthoxia croceata Warren, 1907
- Opisthoxia croesaria (Schaus, 1901)
- Opisthoxia curvilinea (Warren, 1909)
- Opisthoxia danaeata (Walker, 1861)
- Opisthoxia descimoni (Herbulot, 1988)
- Opisthoxia dora (Schaus, 1901)
- Opisthoxia elysiata (Walker, 1861)
- Opisthoxia epichrysops (Oberthür, 1916)
- Opisthoxia erionia (Druce, 1900)
- Opisthoxia eusiraria (Oberthür, 1916)
- Opisthoxia eustyocharia (Oberthür, 1916)
- Opisthoxia farantes (Schaus, 1901)
- Opisthoxia fasciata (Schaus, 1898)
- Opisthoxia formosante (Cramer, 1779)
- Opisthoxia fosteri Warren, 1909
- Opisthoxia geryon (Druce, 1900)
- Opisthoxia gloriosa Bastelberger, 1909
- Opisthoxia haemon (Druce, 1900)
- Opisthoxia halala (Druce, 1900)
- Opisthoxia humilis (Warren, 1905)
- Opisthoxia hybridata (Warren, 1905)
- Opisthoxia integra (Bastelberger, 1907)
- Opisthoxia interrupta Schaus, 1911
- Opisthoxia laticlava Warren, 1904
- Opisthoxia leucophis (Bastelberger, 1911)
- Opisthoxia limboguttata (Felder & Rogenhofer, 1875)
- Opisthoxia lineata (Warren, 1904)
- Opisthoxia lucilla (Butler, 1881)
- Opisthoxia lyllaria (Guenée, 1858)
- Opisthoxia lyonetaria (Snellen, 1874)
- Opisthoxia metargyria (Walker, 1867)
- Opisthoxia miletia (Druce, 1892)
- Opisthoxia molpadia (Druce, 1892)
- Opisthoxia monanaria (Schaus, 1923)
- Opisthoxia ockendeni Warren, 1907
- Opisthoxia olivenzaria (Oberthür, 1916)
- Opisthoxia omphale Prout, 1910
- Opisthoxia orion (Warren, 1904)
- Opisthoxia pamphilaria (Guenée, 1858)
- Opisthoxia pepita (Dognin, 1896)
- Opisthoxia phrynearia (Schaus, 1912)
- Opisthoxia praeamabilis (Oberthür, 1916)
- Opisthoxia projecta (Herbulot, 1988)
- Opisthoxia salubaea Dyar, 1912
- Opisthoxia sardes (Druce, 1900)
- Opisthoxia saturaria Schaus, 1923
- Opisthoxia saturniaria (Herrich-Schäffer, 1855)
- Opisthoxia subalba (Thierry-Mieg, 1916)
- Opisthoxia superamabilis (Oberthür, 1916)
- Opisthoxia transversata (Warren, 1904)
- Opisthoxia trimaculata (Warren, 1907)
- Opisthoxia uncinata (Schaus, 1912)
- Opisthoxia vigilans Warren, 1904
- Opisthoxia virginalis (Oberthür, 1916)
- Opisthoxia vitenaria Schaus, 1923
