= Omoplatica =

Scientific classification
- Domain: Eukaryota
- Kingdom: Animalia
- Phylum: Arthropoda
- Class: Insecta
- Order: Lepidoptera
- Family: Geometridae
- Genus: Omoplatica; Turner, 1926
- Species: O. holopolia

Binomial name
- Omoplatica holopolia Turner, 1926

Genus of moths

Omoplatica is a monotypic moth genus in the family Geometridae. Its only species, Omoplatica holopolia, is known from Australia. Both the genus and species were first described by Alfred Jefferis Turner in 1926.
