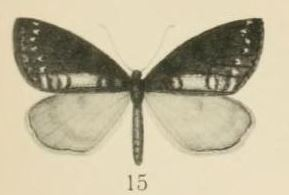

Scientific classification
- Kingdom: Animalia
- Phylum: Arthropoda
- Class: Insecta
- Order: Lepidoptera
- Family: Geometridae
- Subfamily: Ennominae
- Genus: Oreometra; Aurivillius, 1910

= Oreometra =

Genus of insects

Oreometra is a genus of moths in the family Geometridae.

== Species ==
Some species in this genus are:

- Oreometra fifae Wiltshire, 1986
- Oreometra ras Herbulot, 1983
- Oreometra vittata Aurivillius, 1910
