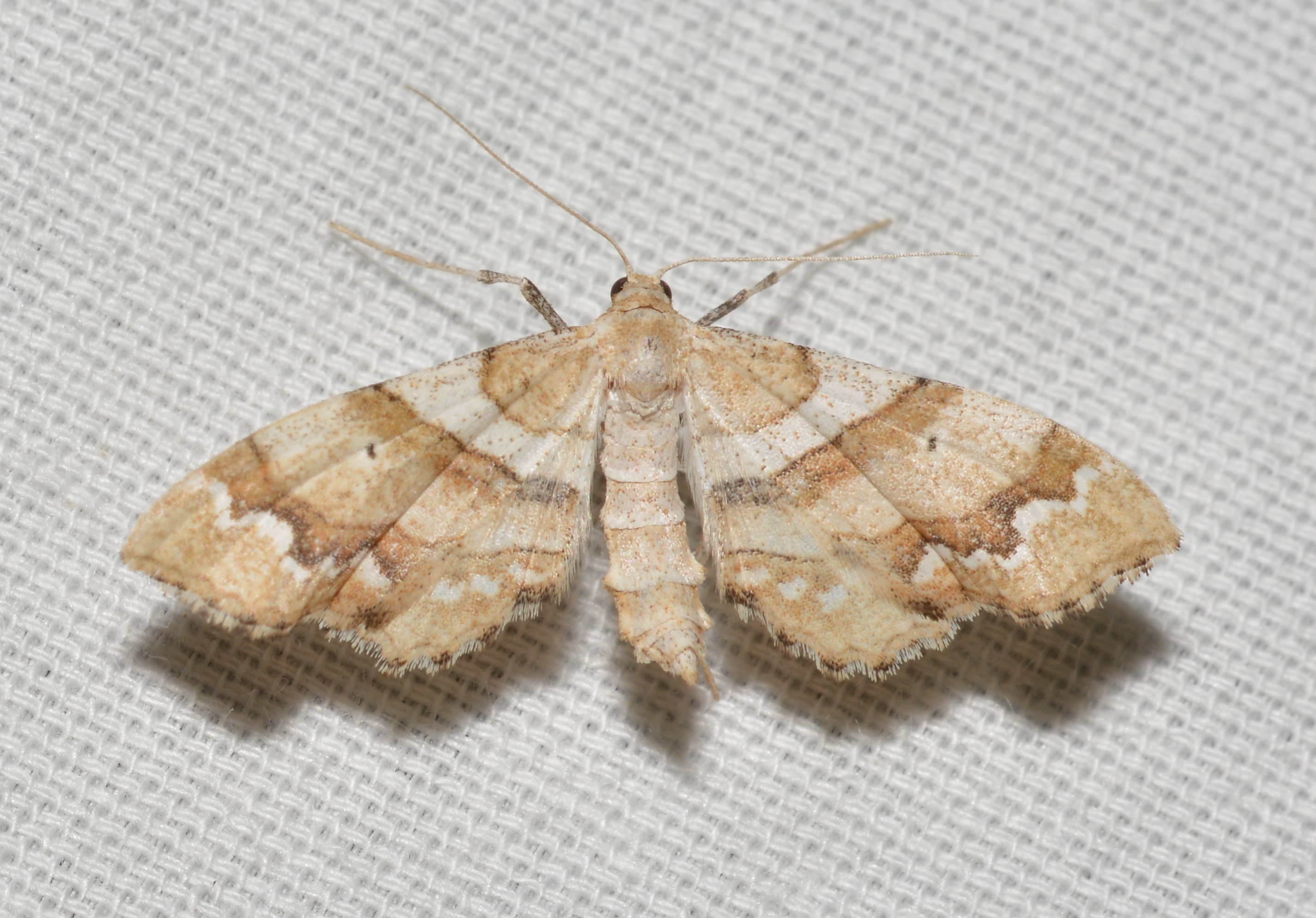

Scientific classification
- Kingdom: Animalia
- Phylum: Arthropoda
- Clade: Pancrustacea
- Class: Insecta
- Order: Lepidoptera
- Family: Geometridae
- Genus: Odontoptila; Warren, 1897
- Species: O. obrimo

Binomial name
- Odontoptila obrimo (Druce, 1892)

= Odontoptila =

Genus of moths

Odontoptila is a monotypic moth genus in the family Geometridae described by Warren in 1897. Its only species, Odontoptila obrimo, was first described by Druce in 1892. It is found in Central and North America.

The MONA or Hodges number for Odontoptila obrimo is 7130.
