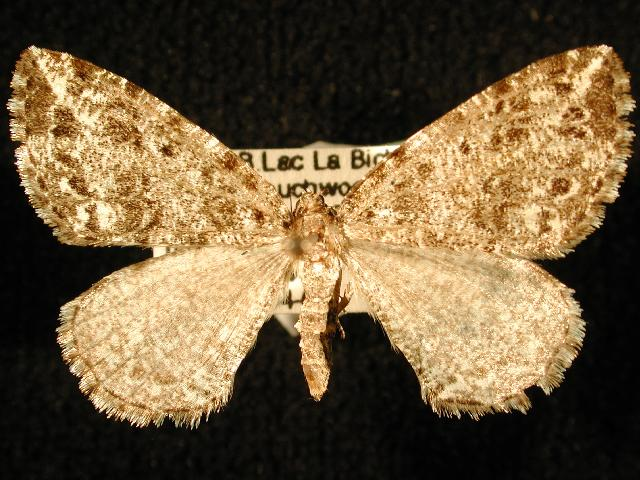
- Orthofidonia tinctaria

Scientific classification
- Kingdom: Animalia
- Phylum: Arthropoda
- Clade: Pancrustacea
- Class: Insecta
- Order: Lepidoptera
- Family: Geometridae
- Tribe: Boarmiini
- Genus: Orthofidonia; Packard, 1876

= Orthofidonia =

Genus of moths

Orthofidonia is a genus of moths in the family Geometridae first described by Packard in 1876.

== Species ==
- Orthofidonia tinctaria (Walker, 1860)
- Orthofidonia exornata (Walker, 1862)
- Orthofidonia flavivenata (Hulst, 1898)
