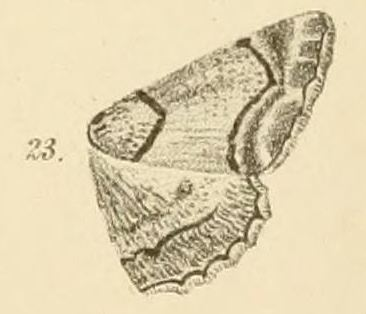
- Omphalucha maturnaria

Scientific classification
- Kingdom: Animalia
- Phylum: Arthropoda
- Class: Insecta
- Order: Lepidoptera
- Family: Geometridae
- Subfamily: Ennominae
- Genus: Omphalucha; Warren, 1905

Type species
- Omphalucha hirta Warren, 1905

= Omphalucha =

Genus of moths

Omphalucha is a genus of moths in the family Geometridae described by Warren in 1905.

== Species ==
- Omphalucha albosignata Janse, 1932
- Omphalucha angulilinea (Janse, 1932)
- Omphalucha apira L. B. Prout, 1938
- Omphalucha brunnea (Warren, 1899)
- Omphalucha crenulata (Warren, 1897)
- Omphalucha ditriba L. B. Prout, 1938
- Omphalucha epixyna L. B. Prout, 1938
- Omphalucha exocholoxa L. B. Prout, 1938
- Omphalucha hirta Warren, 1905
- Omphalucha indeflexa L. B. Prout, 1922
- Omphalucha indigna (L. B. Prout, 1915)
- Omphalucha katangae L. B. Prout, 1934
- Omphalucha maturnaria (Möschler, 1884)
- Omphalucha natalensis Herbulot, 1995
- Omphalucha nubimedia L. B. Prout, 1938
- Omphalucha praeses L. B. Prout, 1938
- Omphalucha prosciodes (L. B. Prout, 1934)
- Omphalucha ruandana Herbulot, 1997
- Omphalucha rufinubes Warren, 1905
