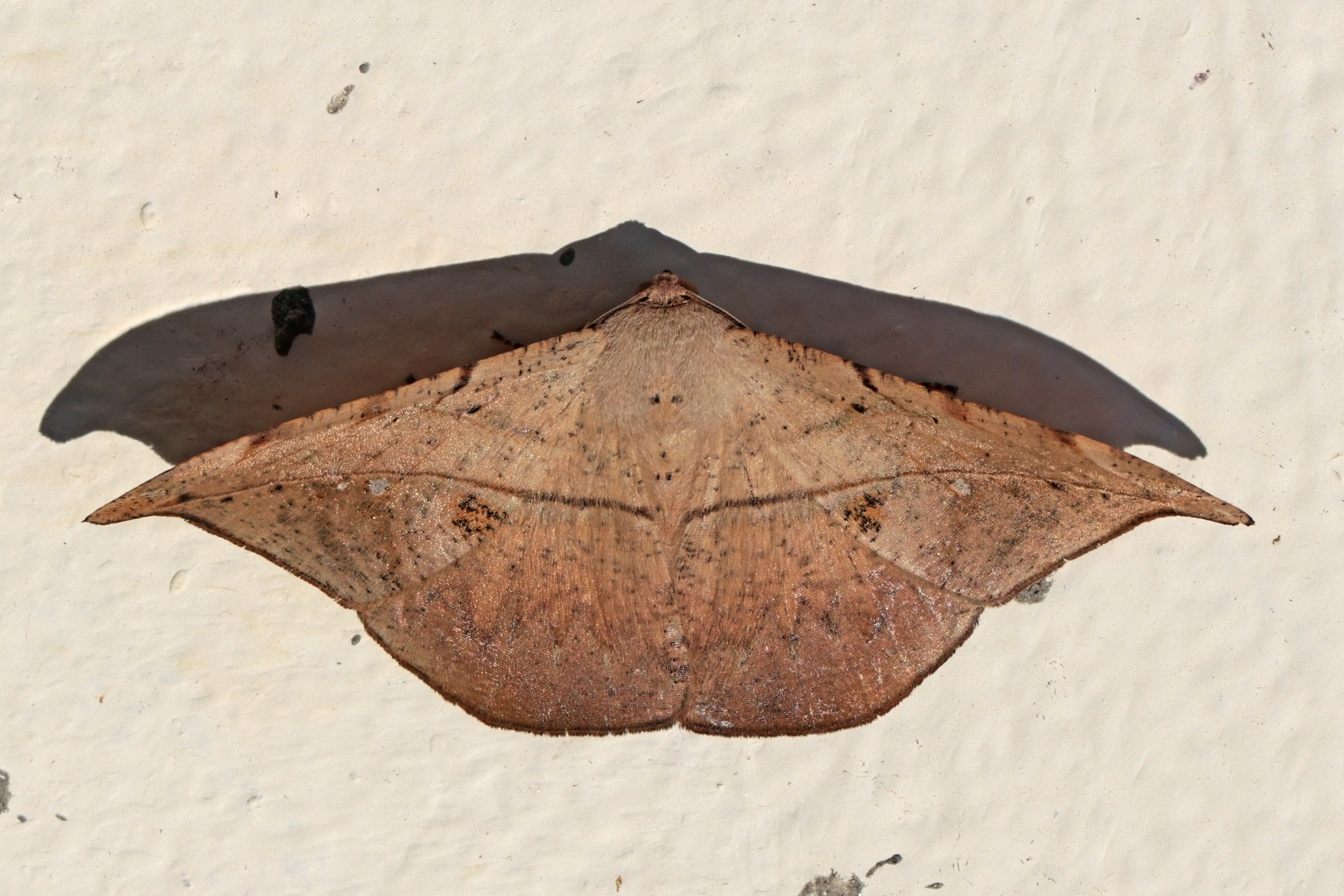
- Spurge spanworm moth O. vesulia Mount Totumas cloud forest, Panama
- O. mexicata Sao Paulo, Brazil

Scientific classification
- Kingdom: Animalia
- Phylum: Arthropoda
- Clade: Pancrustacea
- Class: Insecta
- Order: Lepidoptera
- Family: Geometridae
- Subfamily: Ennominae
- Tribe: Ourapterygini
- Genus: Oxydia; Guenée, 1857

Synonyms
- Andania Walker, 1860

= Oxydia =

Genus of moths

Oxydia is a genus of moths in the family Geometridae first described by Achille Guenée in 1857.

== Species ==
- Oxydia vesulia (Cramer, 1779)
- Oxydia cubana (Warren, 1906)
- Oxydia gueneei (Warren, 1906)
- Oxydia nimbata Guenée, 1857
- Oxydia mundata Guenée, 1857
- Oxydia masthala Druce, 1892
