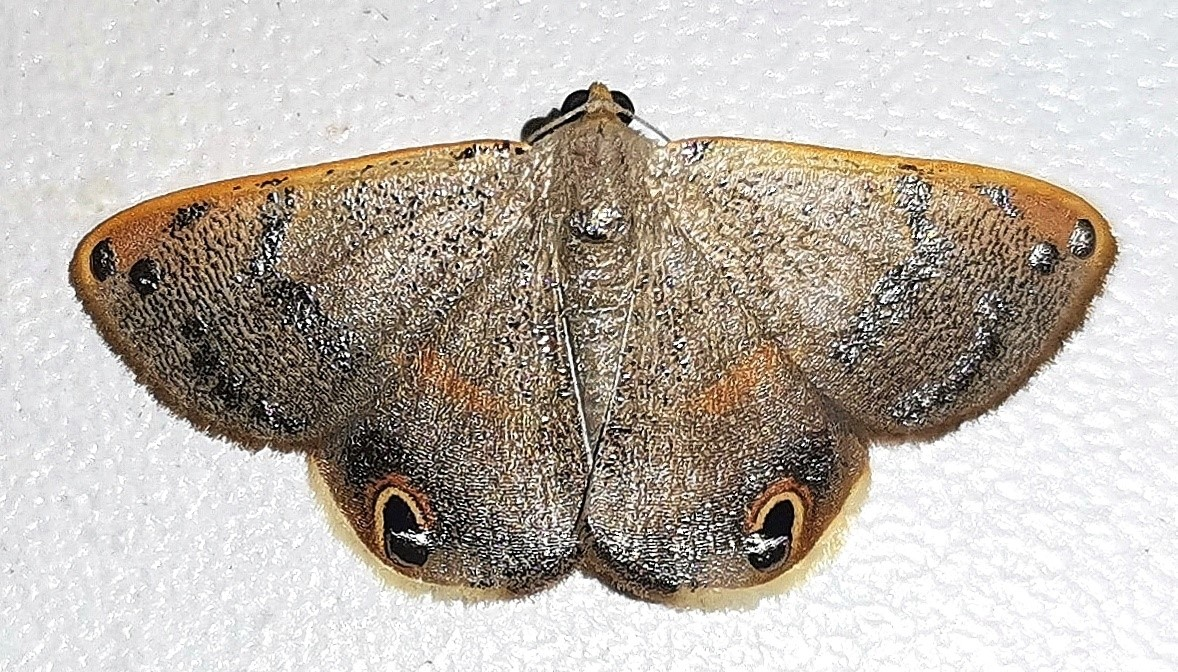
- Ophthalmoblysis plutus

Scientific classification
- Kingdom: Animalia
- Phylum: Arthropoda
- Clade: Pancrustacea
- Class: Insecta
- Order: Lepidoptera
- Family: Geometridae
- Genus: Ophthalmoblysis; Scoble, 1995

= Ophthalmoblysis =

Genus of moths

Ophthalmoblysis is a genus of moths in the family Geometridae.

== Species ==
The following species are recognised in the genus Ophthalmoblysis:

- Ophthalmoblysis cinerea (Warren, 1909)
- Ophthalmoblysis croesus (Oberthür, 1916)
- Ophthalmoblysis fulvata (Warren, 1905)
- Ophthalmoblysis fulvistrota (Dognin, 1908)
- Ophthalmoblysis ibarrai Garzón-Orduña, 2019
- Ophthalmoblysis lydius (Oberthür, 1916)
- Ophthalmoblysis nitidisquama (Warren, 1897)
- Ophthalmoblysis plutus (Oberthür, 1916)
- Ophthalmoblysis scintillans (Warren, 1905)
- BOLD:AAN5628 (Ophthalmoblysis sp.)
- BOLD:ABY1794 (Ophthalmoblysis sp.)
