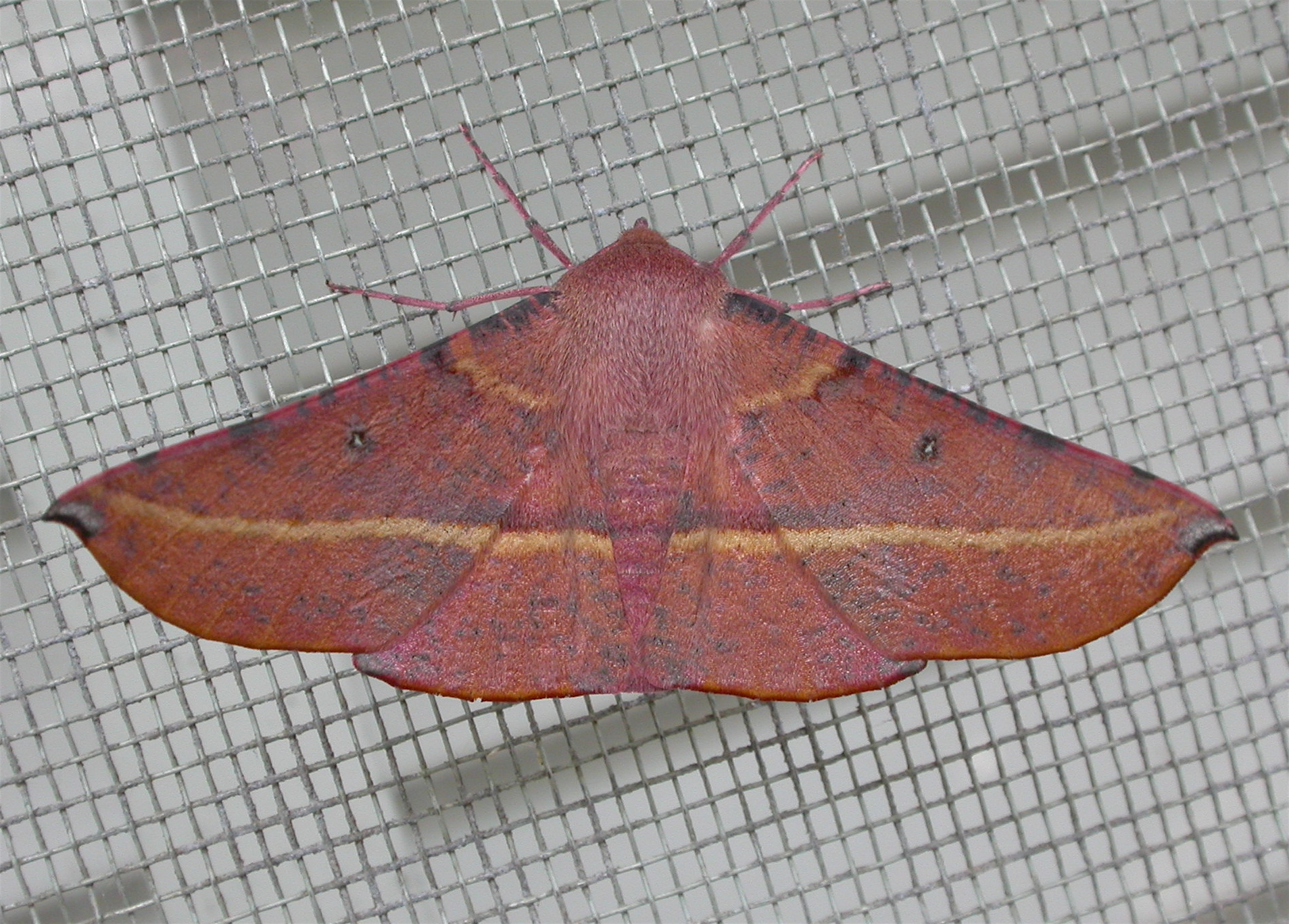
- Oenochroma vinaria1

Scientific classification
- Kingdom: Animalia
- Phylum: Arthropoda
- Clade: Pancrustacea
- Class: Insecta
- Order: Lepidoptera
- Family: Geometridae
- Subfamily: Oenochrominae
- Genus: Oenochroma; Guenée, 1857

= Oenochroma =

Genus of moths

Oenochroma is a genus of moths in the family Geometridae erected by Achille Guenée in 1857.

Oenochroma means "wine colored" from the greek oeno (wine) and chroma (color).

== Species ==
- Oenochroma alpina Turner, 1930
- Oenochroma celidophora Turner, 1939
- Oenochroma cerasiplaga Warren, 1914
- Oenochroma cycnoptera (Lower, 1894)
- Oenochroma decolorata Warren, 1896
- Oenochroma infantilis Prout, 1910
- Oenochroma lissoscia Turner, 1922
- Oenochroma ochripennata (Walker, 1860)
- Oenochroma orthodesma (Lower, 1894)
- Oenochroma pallida Warren, 1898
- Oenochroma phyllomorpha (Lower, 1899)
- Oenochroma polyspila (Lower, 1897)
- Oenochroma privata (Walker, 1860)
- Oenochroma quardrigramma (Lucas, 1900)
- Oenochroma subustaria (Walker, 1860)
- Oenochroma turneri (Lucas, 1892)
- Oenochroma vetustaria (Walker, 1860)
- Oenochroma vinaria Guenée, 1857
