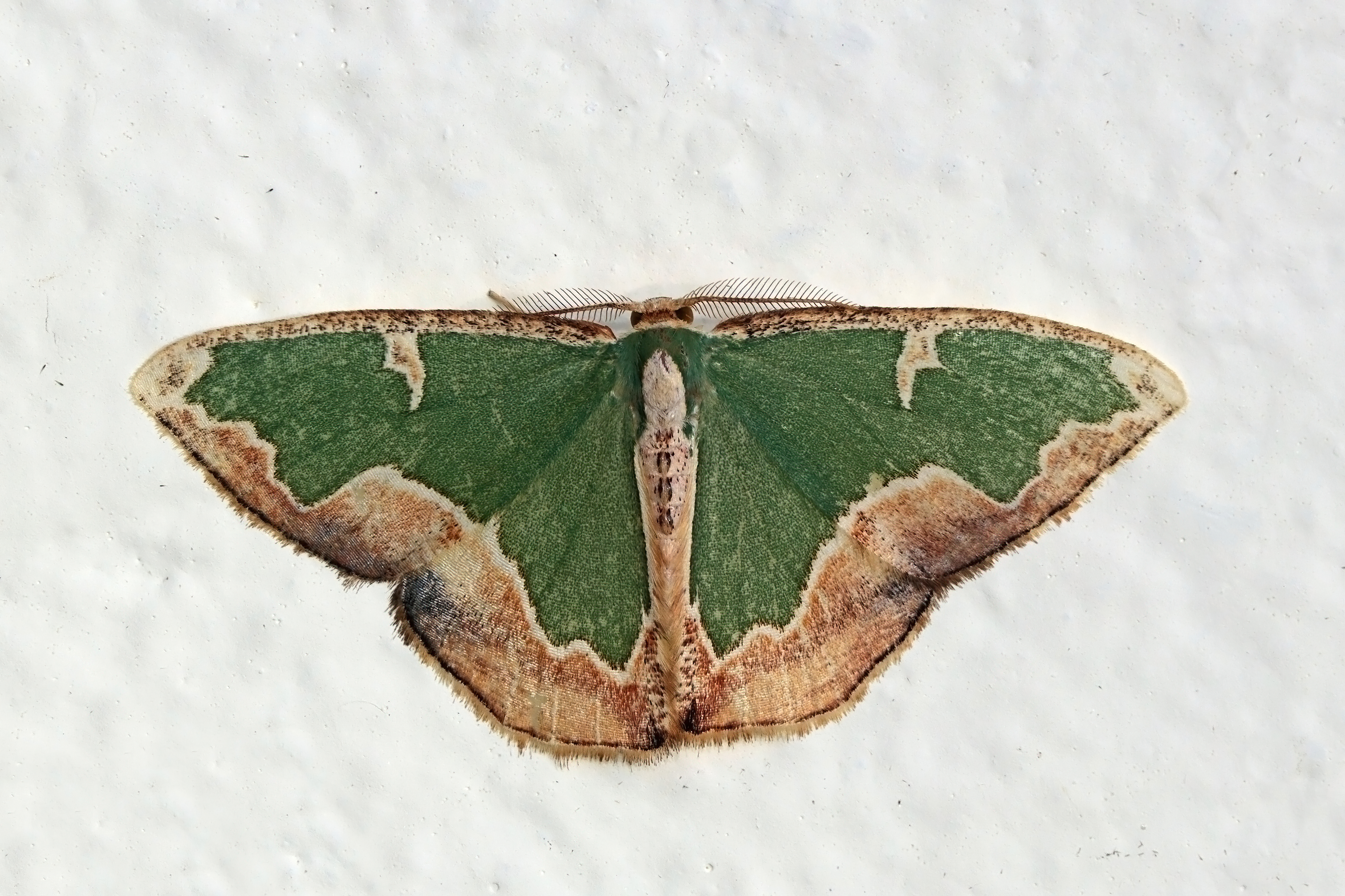
- Oospila venezuelata Mount Totumas cloud forest, Panama

Scientific classification
- Kingdom: Animalia
- Phylum: Arthropoda
- Class: Insecta
- Order: Lepidoptera
- Family: Geometridae
- Subfamily: Geometrinae
- Genus: Oospila; Warren, 1897

Synonyms
- Auophylla Warren, 1897; Auophyllodes Prout, 1912; Drucia Warren, 1900; Halioscia Warren, 1907; Leptolopha Warren, 1909; Oospiloma Prout, 1916; Progonodes Warren, 1897; Racheolopha Warren, 1900; Rhombochlora Warren, 1909; Urucumia Prout, 1933

= Oospila =

Genus of moths

Oospila is a genus of moths in the family Geometridae described by Warren in 1897.

== Species ==
In alphabetical order:

- Oospila acymanta (Prout, 1933)
- Oospila albicoma (Felder & Rogenhofer, 1875)
- Oospila albipunctulata (Prout, 1932)
- Oospila altonaria E. D. Jones, 1921
- Oospila arpata (Schaus, 1897)
- Oospila asmura (Druce, 1892)
- Oospila astigma (Warren, 1907)
- Oospila athena (Druce, 1892)
- Oospila atopochlora Prout, 1933
- Oospila atroviridis Warren, 1904
- Oospila callicula (Druce, 1892)
- Oospila camilla Schaus, 1913
- Oospila carnelunata (Warren, 1906)
- Oospila ciliaria (Hübner, 1823)
- Oospila circumsessa Prout, 1917
- Oospila circumsignata Prout, 1916
- Oospila concinna Warren, 1900
- Oospila confluaria (Warren, 1906)
- Oospila confundaria (Moschler, 1890)
- Oospila congener Warren, 1900
- Oospila continuata (Warren, 1906)
- Oospila decoloraria (Walker, 1861)
- Oospila decorata (Prout, 1932)
- Oospila delacruzi (Dognin, 1898)
- Oospila delphinata (Warren, 1900)
- Oospila depressa Warren, 1905
- Oospila dicraspeda Prout, 1932
- Oospila ecuadorata (Dognin, 1892)
- Oospila euchlora (Prout, 1932)
- Oospila excrescens (Warren, 1906)
- Oospila fimbripedata (Warren, 1907)
- Oospila flavilimes (Warren, 1904)
- Oospila florepicta (Warren, 1906)
- Oospila granulata (Warren, 1909)
- Oospila holochroa (Prout, 1913)
- Oospila hyalina Warren, 1897
- Oospila immaculata Cook & Scoble, 1995
- Oospila includaria (Herrich-Schäffer, 1855)
- Oospila jaspidata (Warren, 1897)
- Oospila lactecincta (Warren, 1909)
- Oospila lacteguttata (Warren, 1909)
- Oospila leucostigma (Warren, 1907)
- Oospila leucothalera (Prout, 1932)
- Oospila lilacina (Warren, 1906)
- Oospila longipalpis (Warren, 1906)
- Oospila longiplaga Warren, 1909
- Oospila lunicincta (Warren, 1909)
- Oospila marginata Warren, 1897
- Oospila miccularia (Guenée, 1857)
- Oospila nigripunctata (Warren, 1909)
- Oospila nivetacta (Warren, 1906)
- Oospila obeliscata (Warren, 1906)
- Oospila obsolescens Prout, 1932
- Oospila pallidaria (Schaus, 1897)
- Oospila pellucida Prout, 1916
- Oospila permagna (Warren, 1909)
- Oospila quinquemaculata (Warren, 1906)
- Oospila rhodophragma Prout, 1916
- Oospila rosipara (Warren, 1897)
- Oospila rubescens (Warren, 1906)
- Oospila rufilimes (Warren, 1905)
- Oospila ruptimacula Warren, 1901
- Oospila sellifera Warren, 1906
- Oospila semispurcata (Warren, 1906)
- Oospila sporadata (Warren, 1906)
- Oospila stagonata (Felder & Rogenhofer, 1875)
- Oospila subaurea (Warren, 1907)
- Oospila thalassina Warren, 1905
- Oospila tricamerata Prout, 1916
- Oospila trilunaria (Guenée, 1857)
- Oospila venezuelata (Walker, 1861)
- Oospila violacea Warren, 1897
- Oospila zamaradaria D. S. Fletcher, 1952
