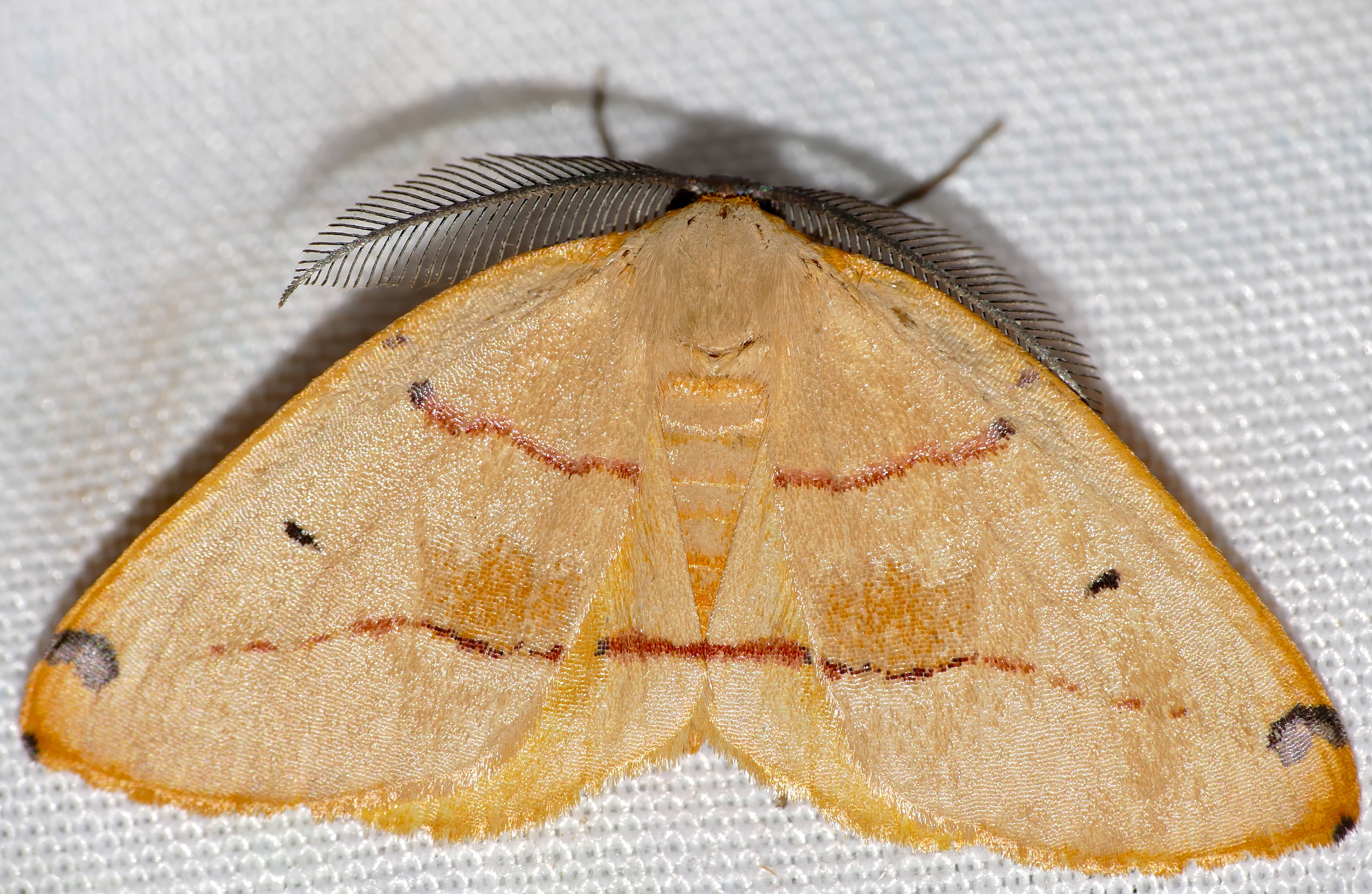
- Omizodes rubrifasciata

Scientific classification
- Kingdom: Animalia
- Phylum: Arthropoda
- Clade: Pancrustacea
- Class: Insecta
- Order: Lepidoptera
- Family: Geometridae
- Genus: Omizodes

= Omizodes =

Genus of moths

Omizodes is a genus of moth in the family Geometridae.
