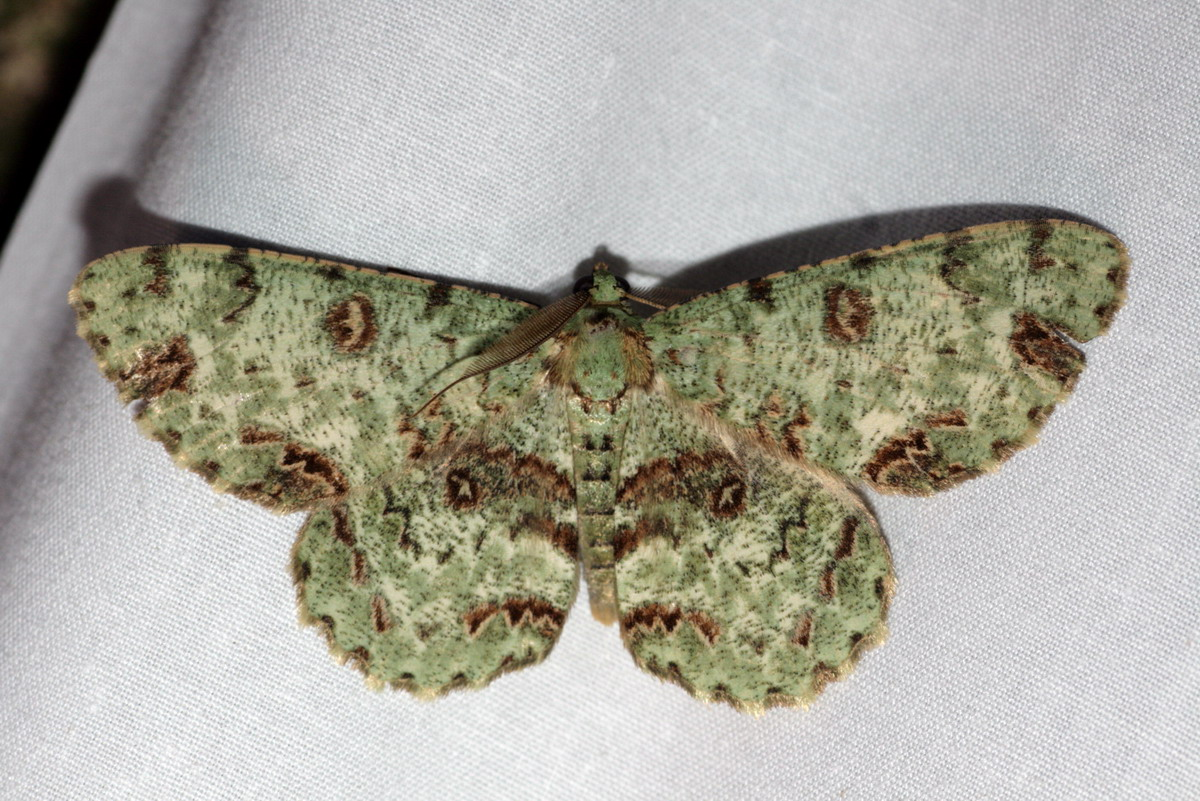
- Crocker Range National Park, Borneo

Scientific classification
- Kingdom: Animalia
- Phylum: Arthropoda
- Clade: Pancrustacea
- Class: Insecta
- Order: Lepidoptera
- Family: Geometridae
- Genus: Opthalmitis
- Species: O. rufilauta

Binomial name
- Ophthalmitis rufilauta Prout, 1925

Synonyms
- Ophthalmodes rufilauta Prout, 1925

= Ophthalmitis rufilauta =

Species of moth

Ophthalmitis rufilauta is a moth in the family Geometridae first described by Louis Beethoven Prout in 1925. It is found in Borneo in lowland and lower montane rainforests. The species is distinguished by the brown shading between the hindwing antemedial line and the discal mark.
