= Orthoserica =

Scientific classification
- Kingdom: Animalia
- Phylum: Arthropoda
- Clade: Pancrustacea
- Class: Insecta
- Order: Lepidoptera
- Family: Geometridae
- Subfamily: Sterrhinae
- Genus: Orthoserica

Genus of moths

Orthoserica is a genus of moths in the family Geometridae.Its species include Orthoserica mirandaria and Orthoserica rufigrisea.
