= Orsonoba =

Scientific classification
- Kingdom: Animalia
- Phylum: Arthropoda
- Clade: Pancrustacea
- Class: Insecta
- Order: Lepidoptera
- Family: Geometridae
- Genus: Orsonoba

Genus of moths

Orsonoba is a genus of moths in the family Geometridae. Species are found throughout India, Sri Lanka, Borneo and Australia.

== Description ==
Palpi thickly scaled and reaching beyond the frons. Antennae bipectinated to two-thirds in male. Hind tibia not dilated. Forewings with arched costa towards apex, which is somewhat falcate. The outer margin oblique, with two dentitions below apex. Inner margin lobed at outer angle. Vein 3 from angle of cell, and vein 5 from just above middle of discocellulars. Vein 7 to 9 stalked, from upper angle and veins 10 and 11 free. Hindwings with the costa deeply excised from middle to apex, which is also excised. The outer margin crenulate and produced at veins 6 and 4 to points which are longer in the female in the male.

== Species ==
- Orsonoba clelia
