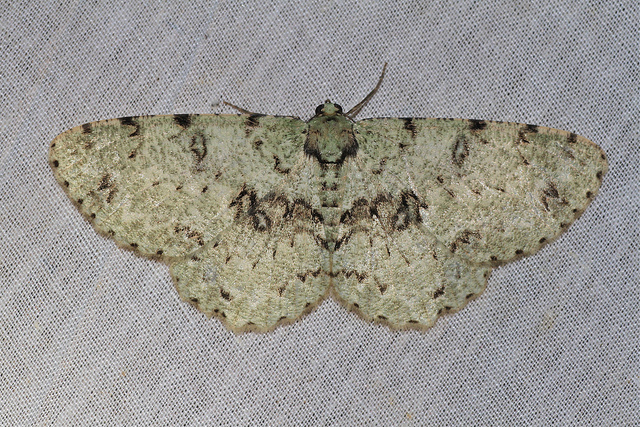
- Ophthalmitis basiscripta from Borneo

Scientific classification
- Kingdom: Animalia
- Phylum: Arthropoda
- Class: Insecta
- Order: Lepidoptera
- Family: Geometridae
- Tribe: Boarmiini
- Genus: Opthalmitis

Type species
- Ophthalmitis herbidaria Guenée, 1857

Synonyms
- Ophthalmodes Guenée, 1857

= Ophthalmitis (moth) =

Genus of moths

Ophthalmitis is a genus of geometer moths in the Boarmiini tribe.

== Description ==
All species have characteristic color patterns: the ground color is pale fawn, suffused or variegated with greenish brown. The fasciae are blackish and the discal spots likewise, prominent on each wing and usually enclosing an ellipse or a lunula of the ground color.

Palpi reaching vertex of head and fringed with hair in front. Antennae bipectinated (comb like on both sides) to near apex in both sexes, the branches longer in the male than female. Hind tibia not dilated. Forewings with a fovea in male. Apex rounded. Vein 3 from close to angle of cell. Veins 7 to 9 stalked from near upper angle. Vein 10 free and vein 11 given off from vein 12. Hindwing with vein 3 from close to angle of cell.

== Species ==
- Ophthalmitis abundantior Wehrli, 1943
- Ophthalmitis albosignaria Bremer & Grey, 1853
- Ophthalmitis basiscripta Holloway, 1993
- Ophthalmitis caritaria Walker, 1860
- Ophthalmitis clararia Walker, 1866
- Ophthalmitis cordularia Swinhoe, 1893
- Ophthalmitis cordularioides Holloway, 1993
- Ophthalmitis diurnaria Guenée, 1858
- Ophthalmitis episcia Wehrli, 1943
- Ophthalmitis exemptaria Walker, 1860
- Ophthalmitis fasciata Warren, 1900
- Ophthalmitis hedemanni Christoph, 1880
- Ophthalmitis herbidaria Guenée, 1857
- Ophthalmitis hypophayla Wehrli, 1943
- Ophthalmitis infusaria Walker, 1860
- Ophthalmitis irrorataria Bremer & Grey, 1853
- Ophthalmitis isorphnia Wehrli, 1943
- Ophthalmitis juglandaria Oberthür, 1913
- Ophthalmitis lectularia Swinhoe, 1891
- Ophthalmitis mundata Walker, 1869
- Ophthalmitis ocellata Leech, 1889
- Ophthalmitis pertusaria Felder, 1874
- Ophthalmitis poliaria Hampson, 1902
- Ophthalmitis prasinospila Prout, 1916
- Ophthalmitis pulsaria Swinhoe, 1891
- Ophthalmitis punctifascia Holloway, 1976
- Ophthalmitis ruficornis Warren, 1897
- Ophthalmitis rufilauta Prout, 1925
- Ophthalmitis satoi Holloway, 1993
- Ophthalmitis saturniaria Graeser, 1888
- Ophthalmitis senex Butler, 1878
- Ophthalmitis sinensium Oberthür, 1913
- Ophthalmitis siniherbida Wehrli, 1943
- Ophthalmitis specificaria Bryk, 1948
- Ophthalmitis striatifera Hampson, 1902
- Ophthalmitis subpicaria Leech, 1897
- Ophthalmitis suppressaria Walker, 1866
- Ophthalmitis variegata Holloway, 1993
- Ophthalmitis viridior Holloway, 1993
- Ophthalmitis xanthypochlora Wehrli, 1924
