= Omphax =

Scientific classification
- Kingdom: Animalia
- Phylum: Arthropoda
- Class: Insecta
- Order: Lepidoptera
- Family: Geometridae
- Subfamily: Geometrinae
- Genus: Omphax; Guenée, 1858

Synonyms
- Agraptochlora Warren, 1894; Pycnodontia Warren, 1901

Genus of moths

Omphax is a genus of moths in the family Geometridae erected by Achille Guenée in 1858.

== Species ==
Some species of this genus are:

- Omphax bara Herbulot, 1972
- Omphax interfulgens Herbulot, 1954
- Omphax neglecta Herbulot, 1977
- Omphax plantaria Guenée, 1858
