= List of geometrid genera: G =

The very large moth family Geometridae contains genera beginning with A, B, C, D, E, F, G, H, I, J, K, L, M, N, O, P, Q, R, S, T, U, V, W, X, Y and Z.

Those beginning with G include:

- Gabriola
- Gagitodes
- Galactochlora
- Galactopteryx
- Galanageia
- Galenara
- Gamoruna
- Gandaritis
- Garaeus
- Gasmara
- Gasterocome
- Gastrina
- Gastrinodes
- Gastrinopa
- Gastrophora
- Gazena
- Geitonia
- Gela
- Gelasma
- Gelasmodes
- Gellonia
- Genusa
- Genussa
- Geodena
- Geoglada
- Geolyces
- Geometra
- Geometridites
- Geometrina
- Geometrodes
- Gerusia
- Gigantalcis
- Gigantothea
- Gingidiobora
- Glacies
- Gladela
- Glaucina
- Glaucoclystis
- Glaucopteryx
- Glaucorhoe
- Glena
- Glenoides
- Gloduria
- Glossotrophia
- Gnamptoloma
- Gnamptomia
- Gnamptopteryx
- Gnathosocia
- Gnopharmia
- Gnophopsodos
- Gnophos
- Gnophosema
- Godonela
- Gonanticlea
- Gongropteryx
- Goniacidalia
- Gonilythria
- Goniocampa
- Goniopteroloba
- Gonochlora
- Gonodontis
- Gonogala
- Gonophaga
- Gonophylla
- Gonora
- Gonorthus
- Gorytodes
- Gozmanyita
- Graefia
- Grammatophora
- Grammicheila
- Grammicopteryx
- Grammochesias
- Graphidipus
- Grossbeckia
- Guara
- Gubaria
- Gueneria
- Gullaca
- Gyadroma
- Gyalomia
- Gymnodisca
- Gymnopera
- Gymnoscelis
- Gymnospile
- Gynandria
- Gynopteryx
- Gyostega
- Gypsara
- Gypsochroa
