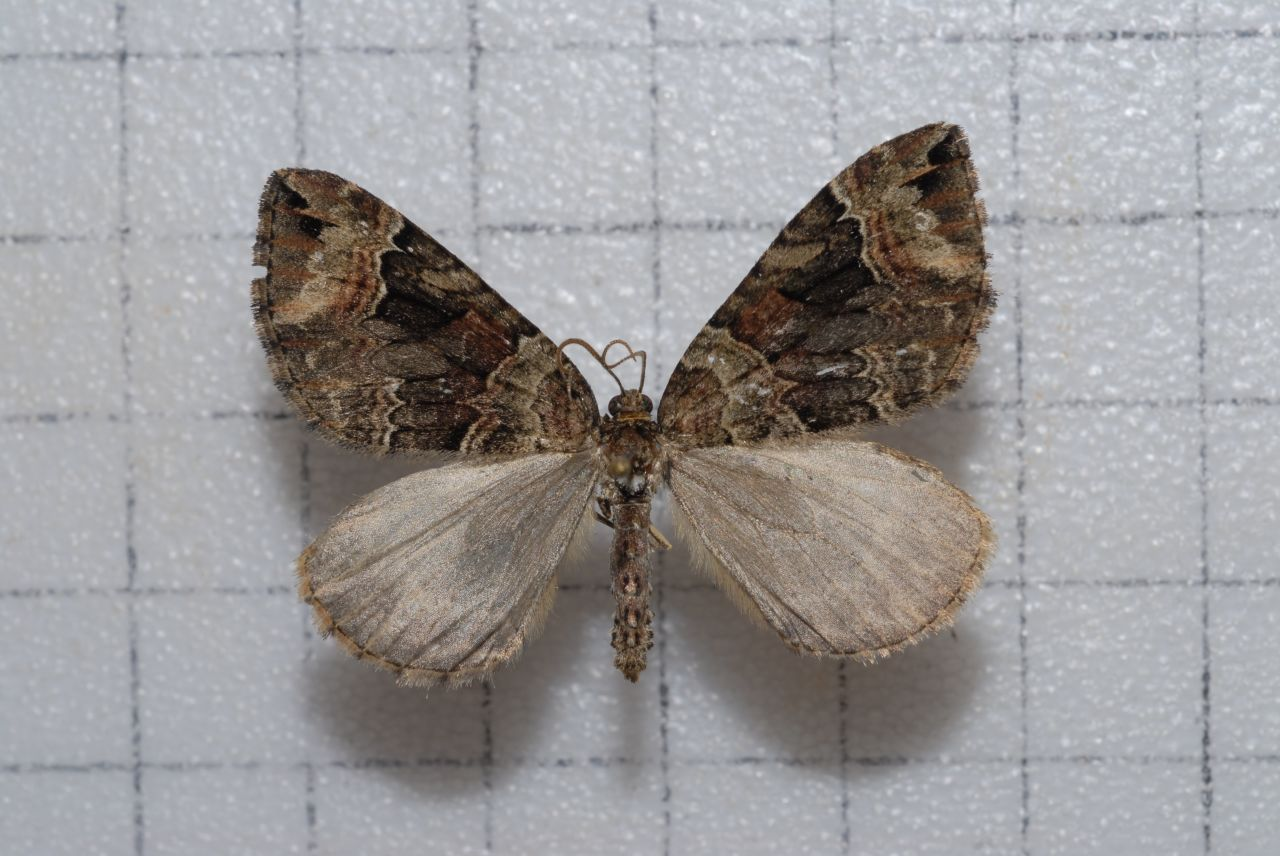

Scientific classification
- Kingdom: Animalia
- Phylum: Arthropoda
- Class: Insecta
- Order: Lepidoptera
- Family: Geometridae
- Genus: Gonanticlea
- Species: G. ochreivittata

Binomial name
- Gonanticlea ochreivittata (Bastelberger, 1909)

Synonyms
- Cidaria ochreivittata Bastelberger 1909; Glaucopteryx latifasciata Wileman, 1912

= Gonanticlea ochreivittata =

Species of moth

Gonanticlea ochreivittata is a moth of the family Geometridae first described by Max Bastelberger in 1909. It is found in Taiwan.

== Subspecies ==
This species is further split into two subspecies:

- Gonanticlea ochreivittata ochreivittata
- Gonanticlea ochreivittata yunnanensis Prout, 1939
