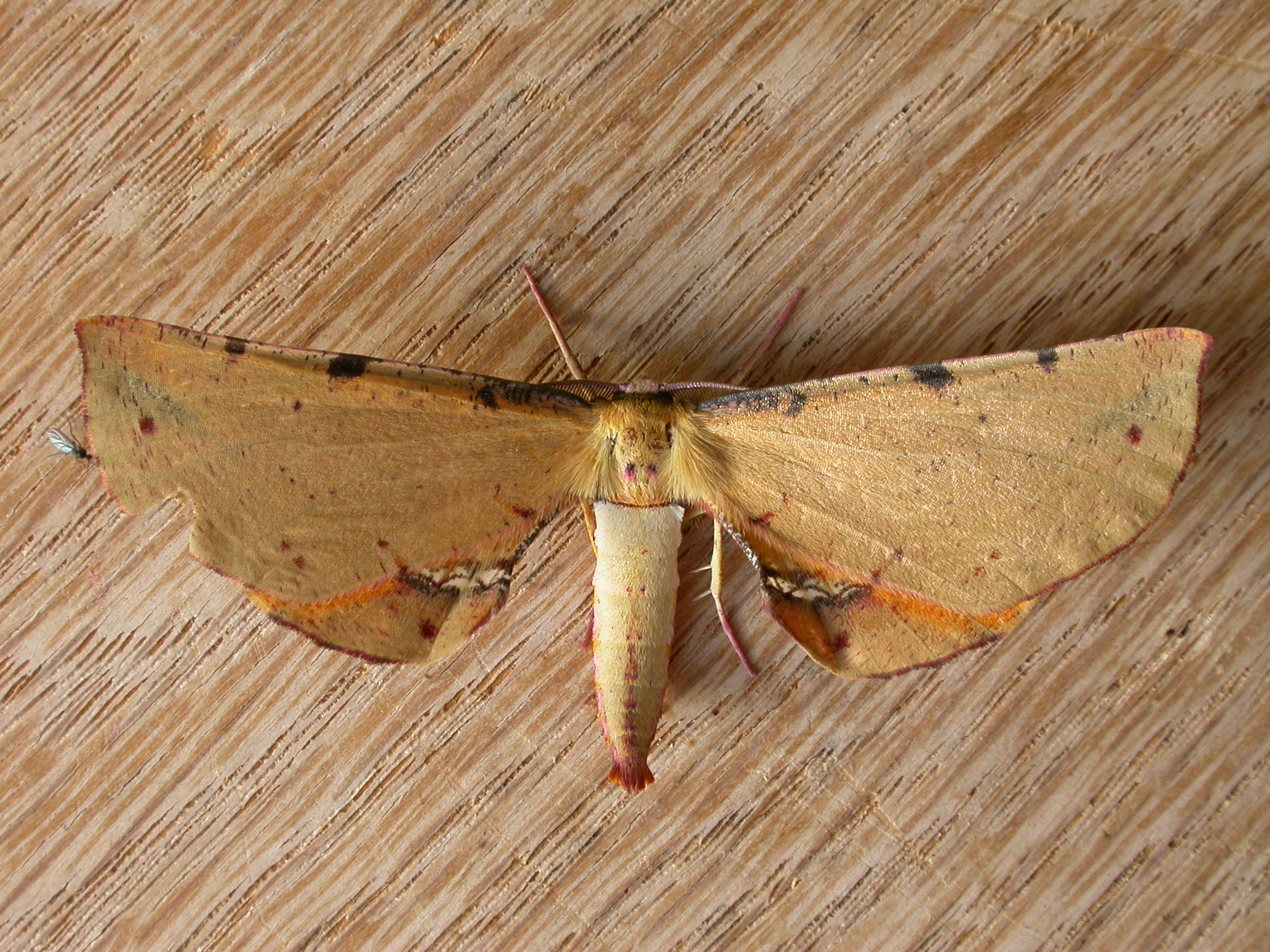

Scientific classification
- Kingdom: Animalia
- Phylum: Arthropoda
- Clade: Pancrustacea
- Class: Insecta
- Order: Lepidoptera
- Family: Geometridae
- Genus: Parepisparis
- Species: P. lutosaria

Binomial name
- Parepisparis lutosaria (R. Felder & Rogenhofer, 1875)

Synonyms
- Arhodia lutosaria R. Felder & Rogenhofer, 1875; Arhodia punicea R. Felder & Rogenhofer, 1875

= Parepisparis lutosaria =

Species of moth

Parepisparis lutosaria, the bright twisted moth, is a species of moth of the family Geometridae. It was first described by Rudolf Felder and Alois Friedrich Rogenhofer in 1875. It is known to be from the Australian states of Queensland, New South Wales and Victoria.

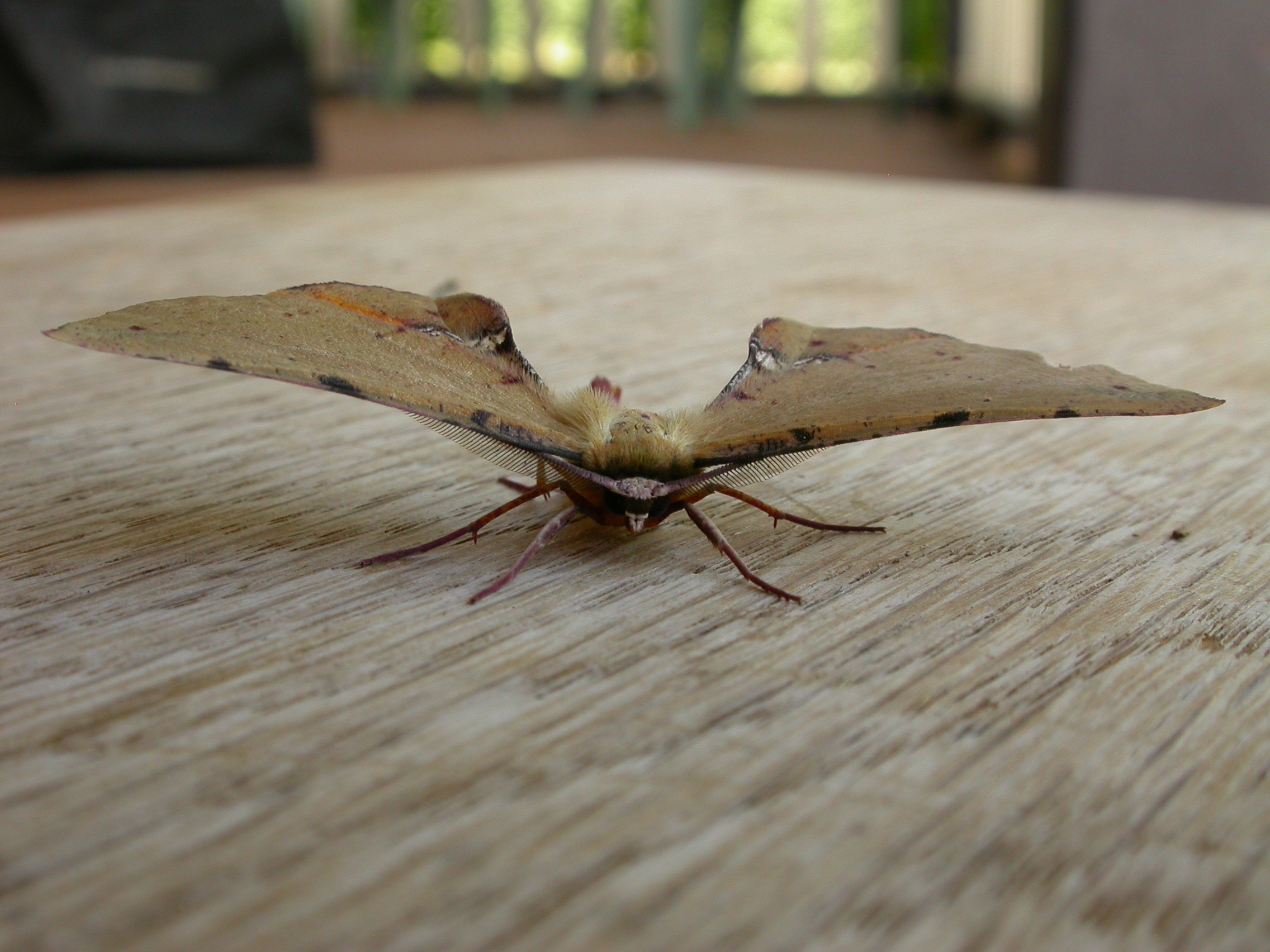
