= Glaucina eureka =

Scientific classification
- Kingdom: Animalia
- Phylum: Arthropoda
- Clade: Pancrustacea
- Class: Insecta
- Order: Lepidoptera
- Family: Geometridae
- Genus: Glaucina
- Species: G. eureka

Binomial name
- Glaucina eureka (Grossbeck, 1912)

Species of moth

Glaucina eureka is a species of geometrid moth in the family Geometridae.
