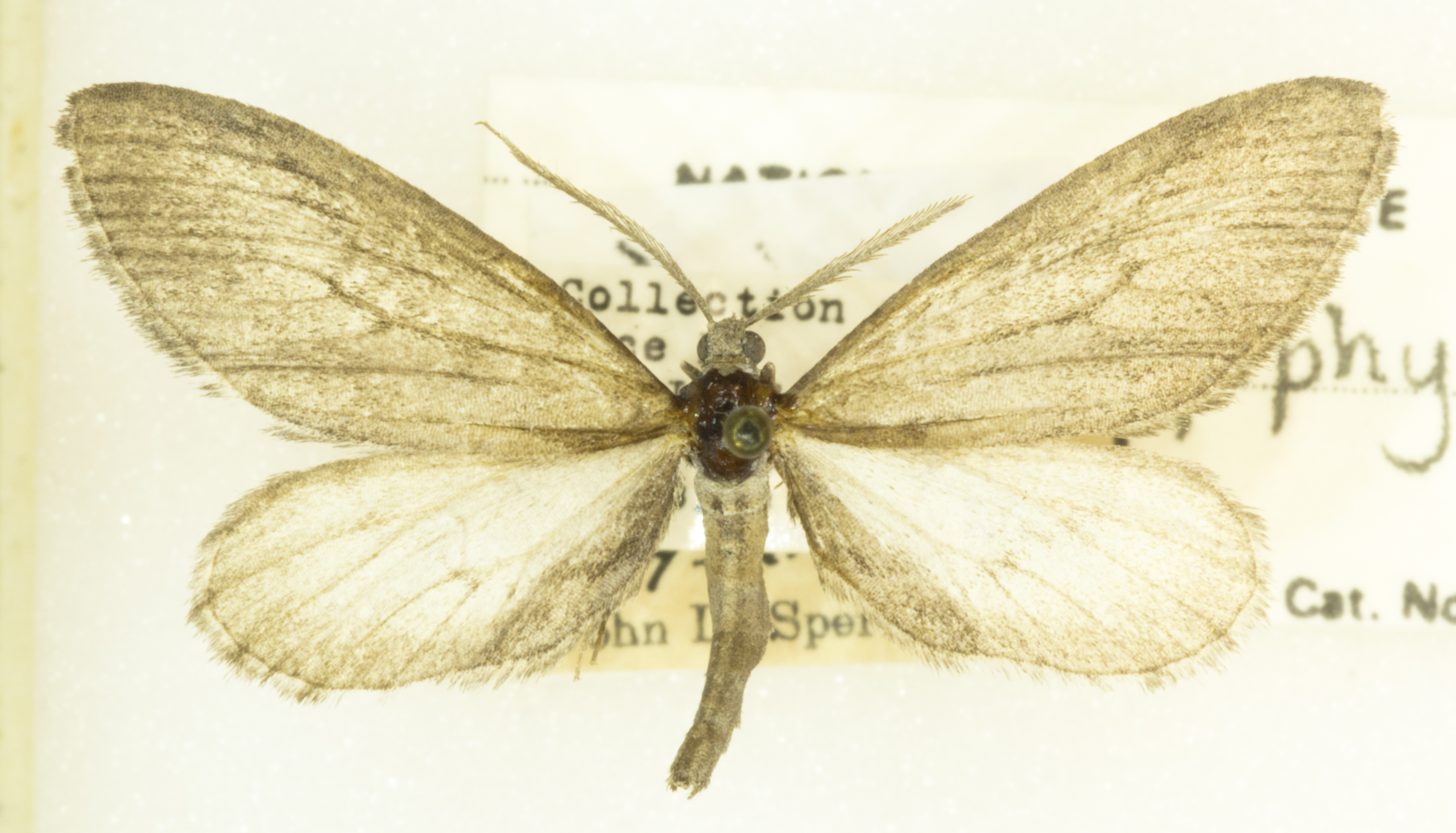

Scientific classification
- Kingdom: Animalia
- Phylum: Arthropoda
- Clade: Pancrustacea
- Class: Insecta
- Order: Lepidoptera
- Family: Geometridae
- Genus: Glaucina
- Species: G. epiphysaria

Binomial name
- Glaucina epiphysaria Dyar, 1908

= Glaucina epiphysaria =

Species of moth

Glaucina epiphysaria is a species of geometrid moth in the family Geometridae. It is found in North America.
