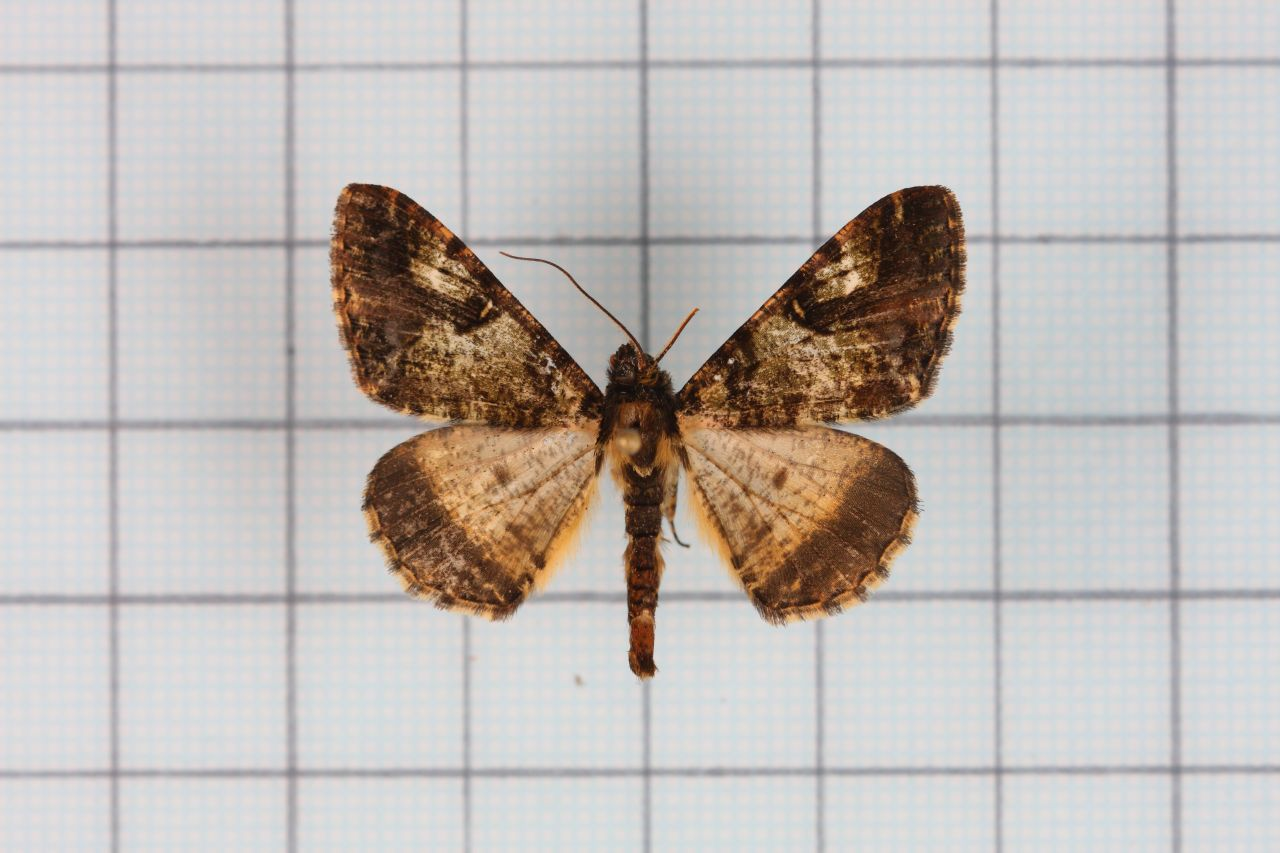
- Gasterocome pannosaria orta

Scientific classification
- Kingdom: Animalia
- Phylum: Arthropoda
- Clade: Pancrustacea
- Class: Insecta
- Order: Lepidoptera
- Family: Geometridae
- Genus: Gasterocome
- Species: G. pannosaria

Binomial name
- Gasterocome pannosaria (Moore, 1868)

Synonyms
- Cleora pannosaria Moore, 1868; Diplurodes contacta Warren, 1899; Boarmia orta Bastelberger, 1911; Boarmia sinicaria Leech, 1897

= Gasterocome pannosaria =

Species of insect

Gasterocome pannosaria is a moth in the family Geometridae. It is found from northern India, Nepal, Bhutan and Indochina to Sundaland and Taiwan. It is associated with mountaineous areas.

The wingspan is 34–39 mm.

== Subspecies ==
There are five accepted subspecies:

- Gasterocome pannosaria pannosaria (India)
- Gasterocome pannosaria contacta (Warren, 1899)
- Gasterocome pannosaria macarista Prout, 1932 (Borneo)
- Gasterocome pannosaria orta (Bastelberger, 1911) (Taiwan)
- Gasterocome pannosaria sinicaria (Leech, 1897)
