= Graphidipus collaris =

Scientific classification
- Kingdom: Animalia
- Phylum: Arthropoda
- Clade: Pancrustacea
- Class: Insecta
- Order: Lepidoptera
- Family: Geometridae
- Genus: Graphidipus
- Species: G. collaris

Binomial name
- Graphidipus collaris (Felder, 1875)

Species of moth

Graphidipus collaris is a species of geometer moth first described by Felder in 1875.
