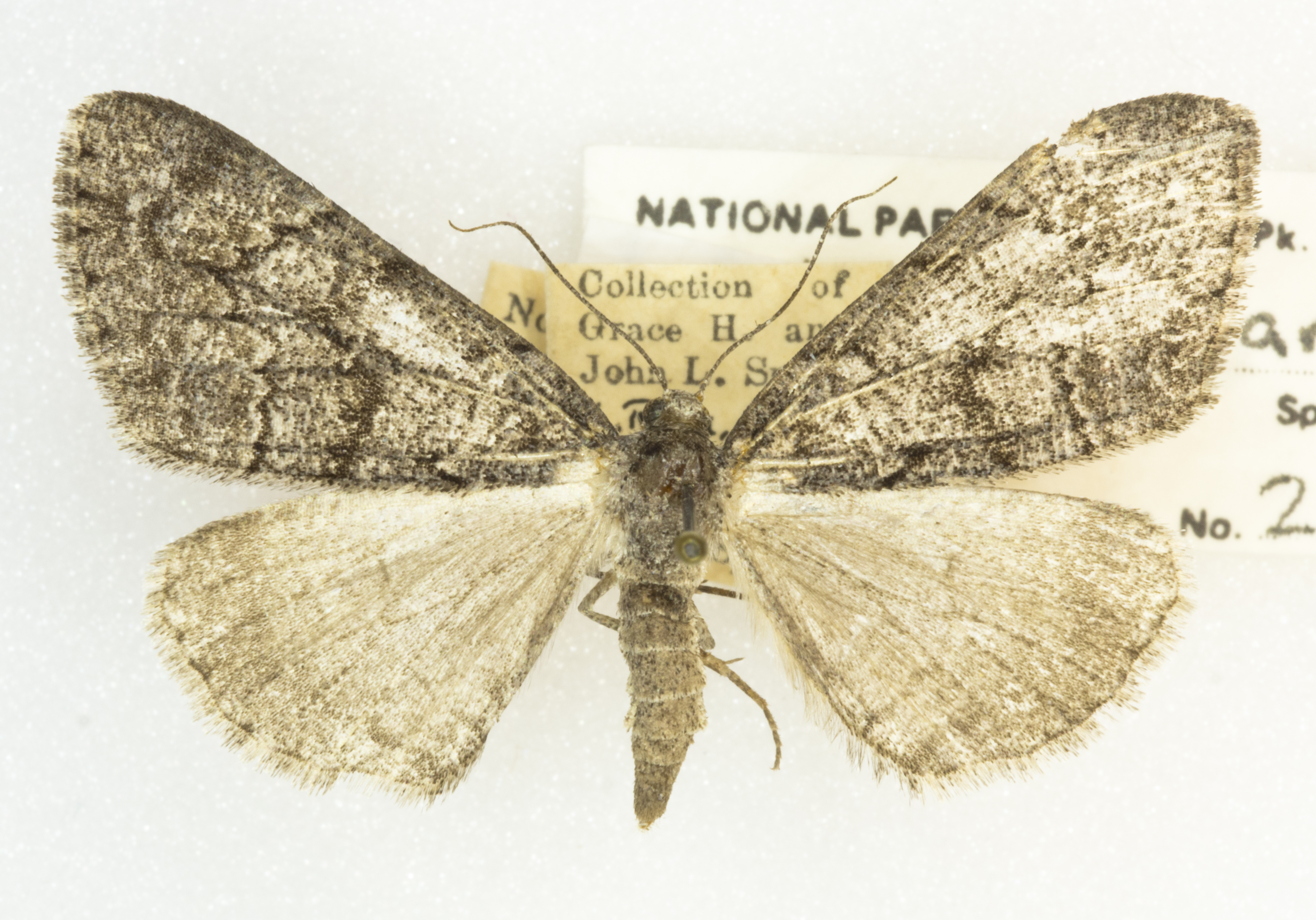

Scientific classification
- Kingdom: Animalia
- Phylum: Arthropoda
- Class: Insecta
- Order: Lepidoptera
- Family: Geometridae
- Genus: Galenara
- Species: G. lixaria

Binomial name
- Galenara lixaria (Grote, 1883)

= Galenara lixaria =

Species of moth

Galenara lixaria is a species of geometrid moth in the family Geometridae. It is found in North America.

The MONA or Hodges number for Galenara lixaria is 6630.
