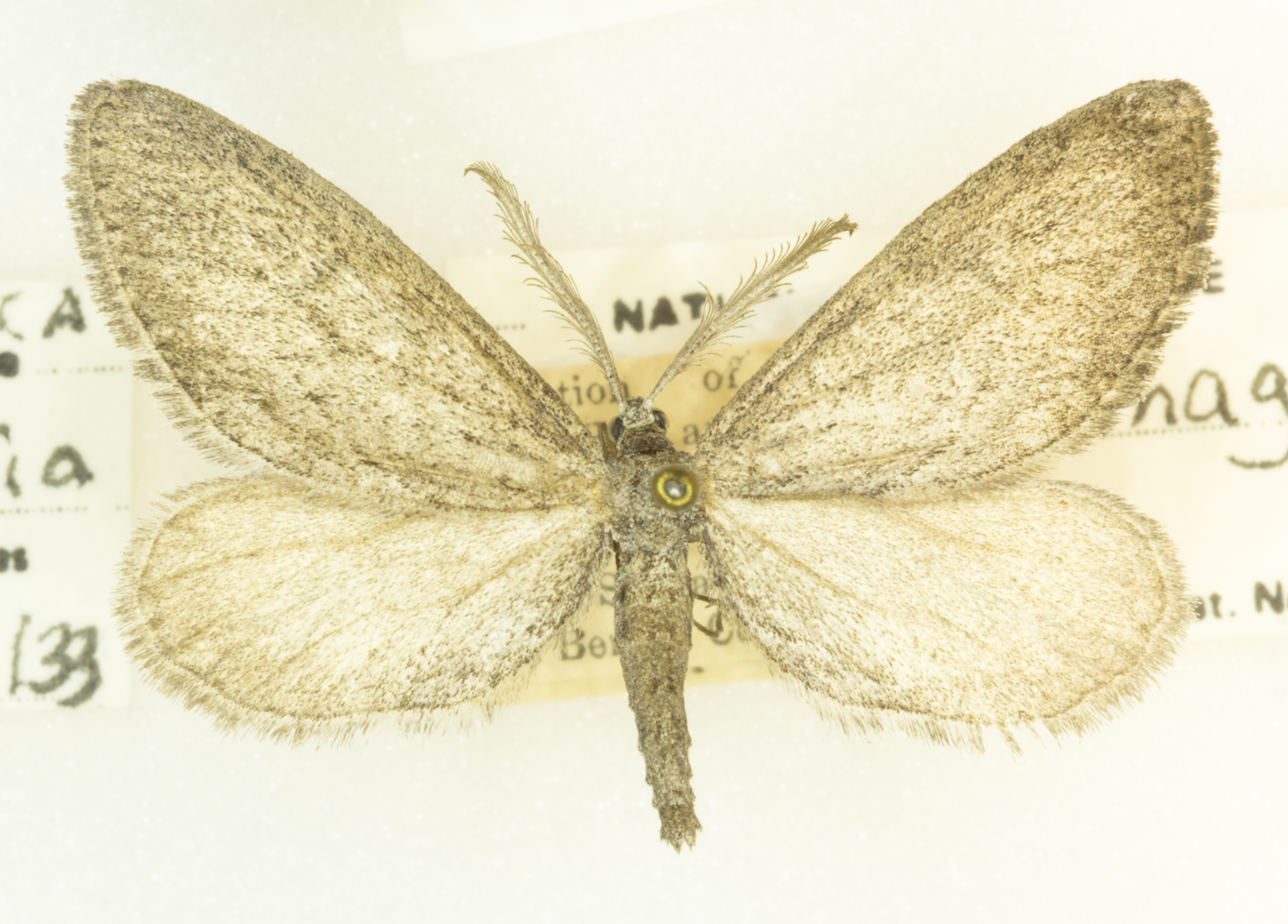

Scientific classification
- Domain: Eukaryota
- Kingdom: Animalia
- Phylum: Arthropoda
- Class: Insecta
- Order: Lepidoptera
- Family: Geometridae
- Genus: Glaucina
- Species: G. magnifica

Binomial name
- Glaucina magnifica Grossbeck, 1912

= Glaucina magnifica =

Species of moth

Glaucina magnifica is a species of geometrid moth in the family Geometridae. It is found in North America.

The MONA or Hodges number for Glaucina magnifica is 6499.
