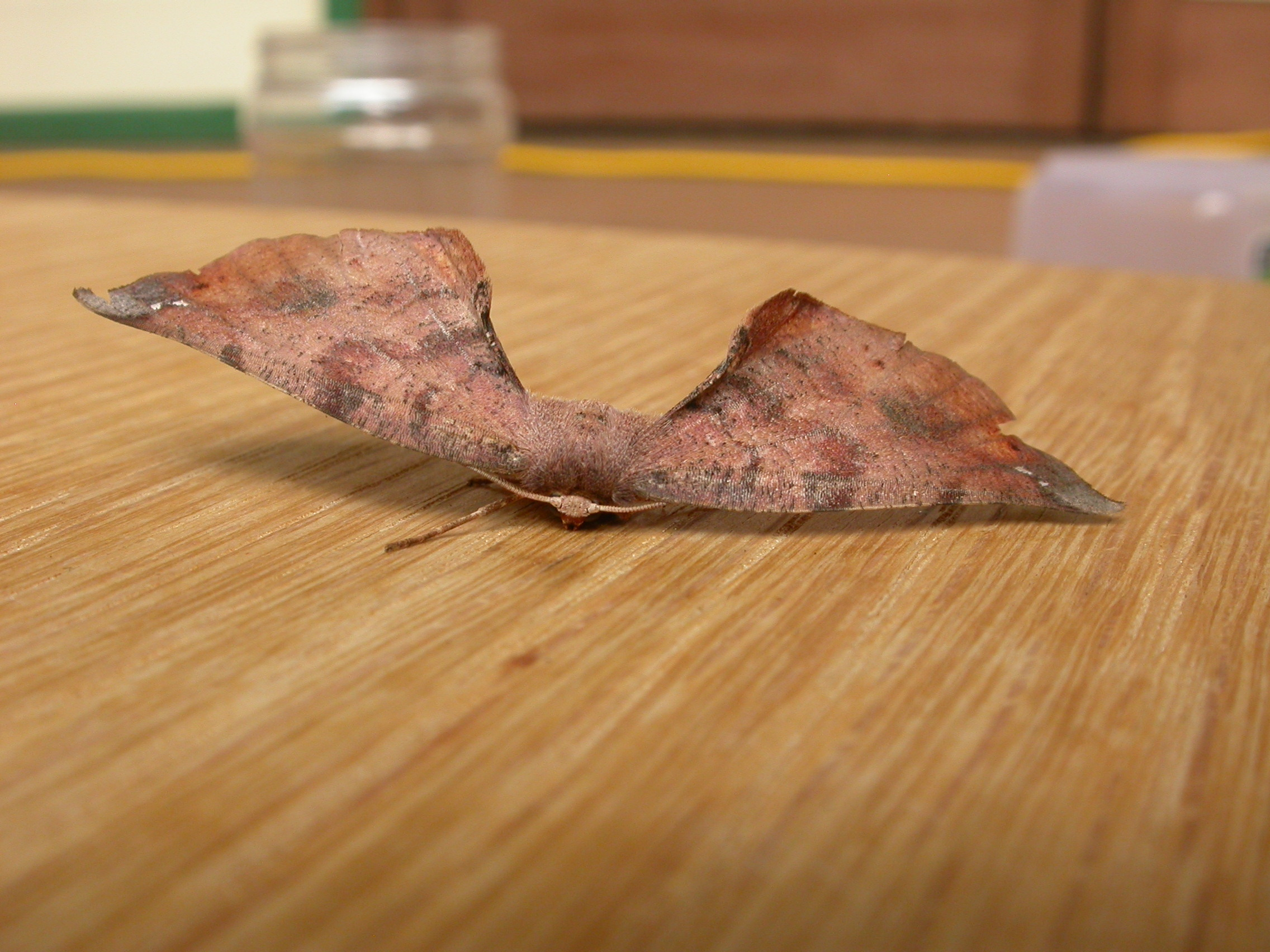

Scientific classification
- Kingdom: Animalia
- Phylum: Arthropoda
- Clade: Pancrustacea
- Class: Insecta
- Order: Lepidoptera
- Family: Geometridae
- Genus: Parepisparis
- Species: P. virgatus

Binomial name
- Parepisparis virgatus Scoble & E. D. Edwards, 1990

= Parepisparis virgatus =

Species of moth

Parepisparis virgatus, the brown twisted moth, is a moth of the family Geometridae. The species was first described by Malcolm J. Scoble and Edward David Edwards in 1990. It is found in the Australian states of New South Wales and Victoria.
