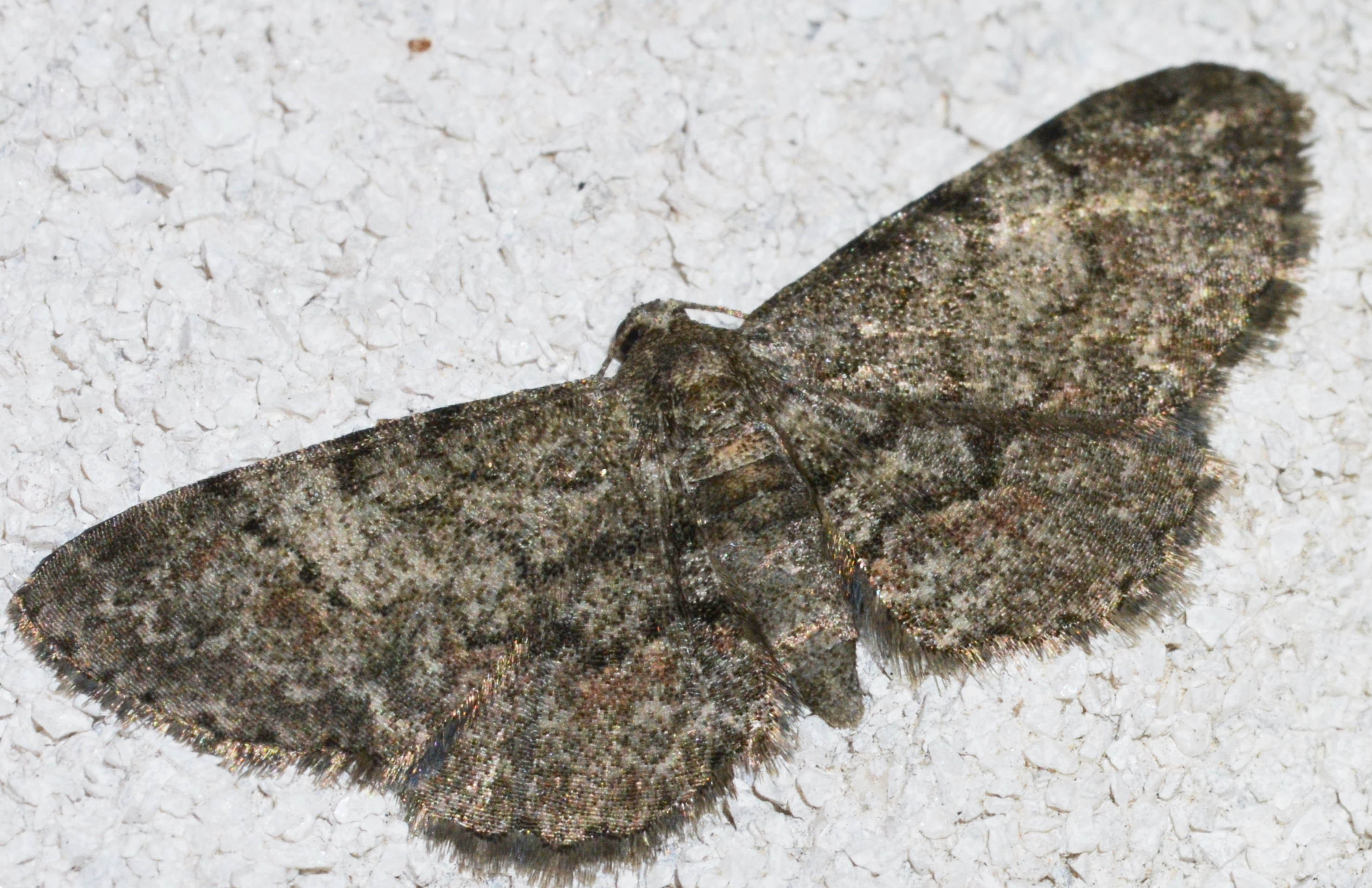

Scientific classification
- Domain: Eukaryota
- Kingdom: Animalia
- Phylum: Arthropoda
- Class: Insecta
- Order: Lepidoptera
- Family: Geometridae
- Genus: Glenoides
- Species: G. texanaria

Binomial name
- Glenoides texanaria (Hulst, 1888)

Synonyms
- Tephrosia texanaria Hulst, 1888

= Glenoides texanaria =

Species of moth

Glenoides texanaria, the Texas gray moth, is a moth in the family Geometridae. It is found in North America, where it has been recorded from Massachusetts to Florida and from Missouri to Texas.

The wingspan is 16–24 mm. Adults are mainly on wing from January to April and from June to December in Florida.
