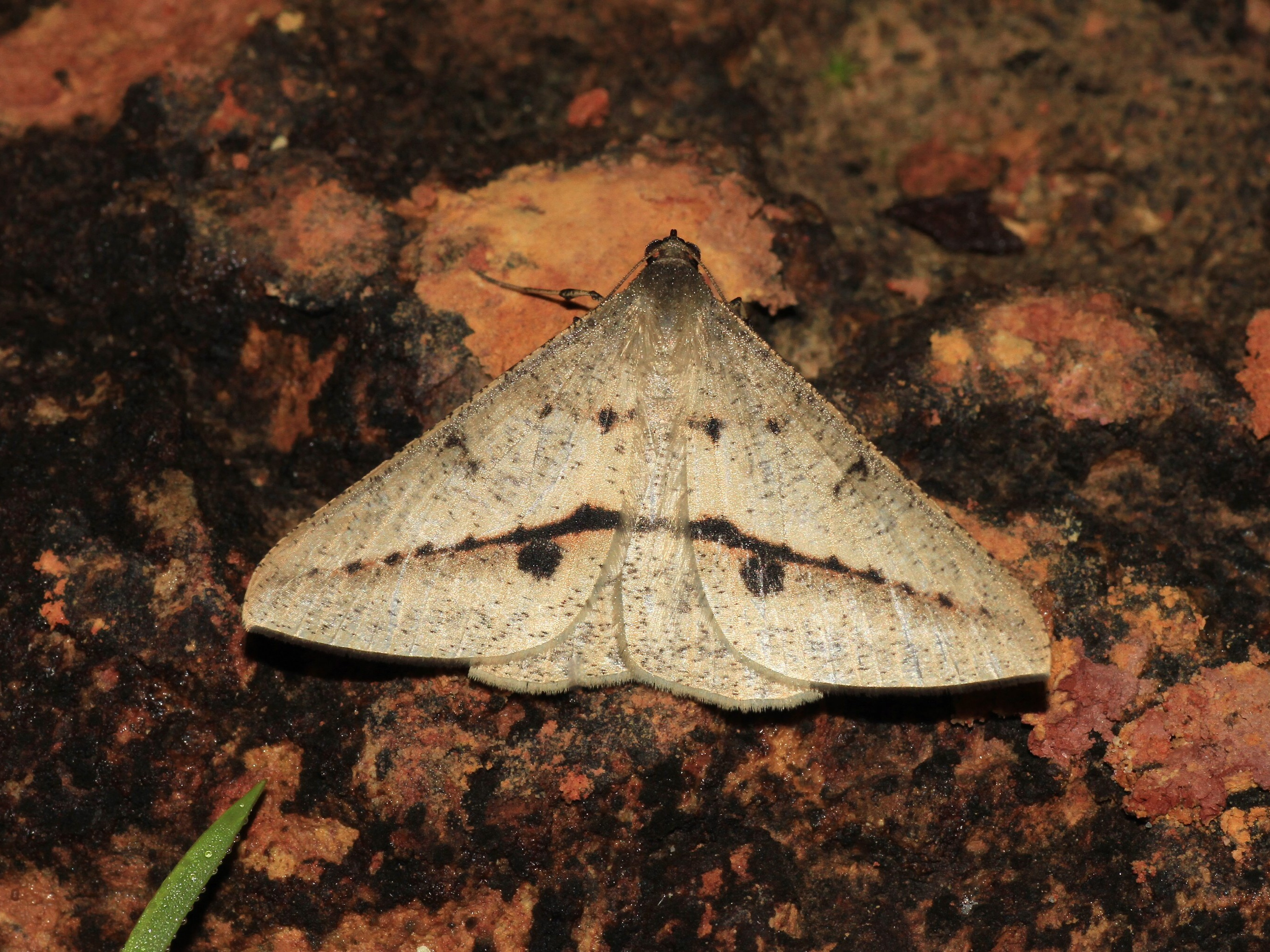

Scientific classification
- Kingdom: Animalia
- Phylum: Arthropoda
- Clade: Pancrustacea
- Class: Insecta
- Order: Lepidoptera
- Family: Geometridae
- Genus: Conolophia
- Species: C. nigripuncta

Binomial name
- Conolophia nigripuncta (Hampson, 1891)

Synonyms
- Gamoruna nigripuncta Hampson, 1891

= Conolophia nigripuncta =

Species of moth

Conolophia nigripuncta is a moth of the family Geometridae first described by George Hampson in 1891. It is found in Sri Lanka, the Indian subregion, Myanmar, Indochina and Borneo.

Adults are easily distinguishable by the combination of an oblique postmedial and distal subdorsal black disc on forewings. One subspecies is recognized - Conolophia nigripuncta rudis found in Borneo.
