= Glaucina nephos =

Scientific classification
- Domain: Eukaryota
- Kingdom: Animalia
- Phylum: Arthropoda
- Class: Insecta
- Order: Lepidoptera
- Family: Geometridae
- Genus: Glaucina
- Species: G. nephos

Binomial name
- Glaucina nephos Rindge, 1959

Species of moth

Glaucina nephos is a species of geometrid moth in the family Geometridae occurring in North America.

The MONA or Hodges number for Glaucina nephos is 6506.
