= Gabriola regularia =

Scientific classification
- Domain: Eukaryota
- Kingdom: Animalia
- Phylum: Arthropoda
- Class: Insecta
- Order: Lepidoptera
- Family: Geometridae
- Tribe: Nacophorini
- Genus: Gabriola
- Species: G. regularia

Binomial name
- Gabriola regularia McDunnough, 1945

Species of moth

Gabriola regularia is a species of geometrid moth in the family Geometridae. It is found in North America.

The MONA or Hodges number for Gabriola regularia is 6785.
