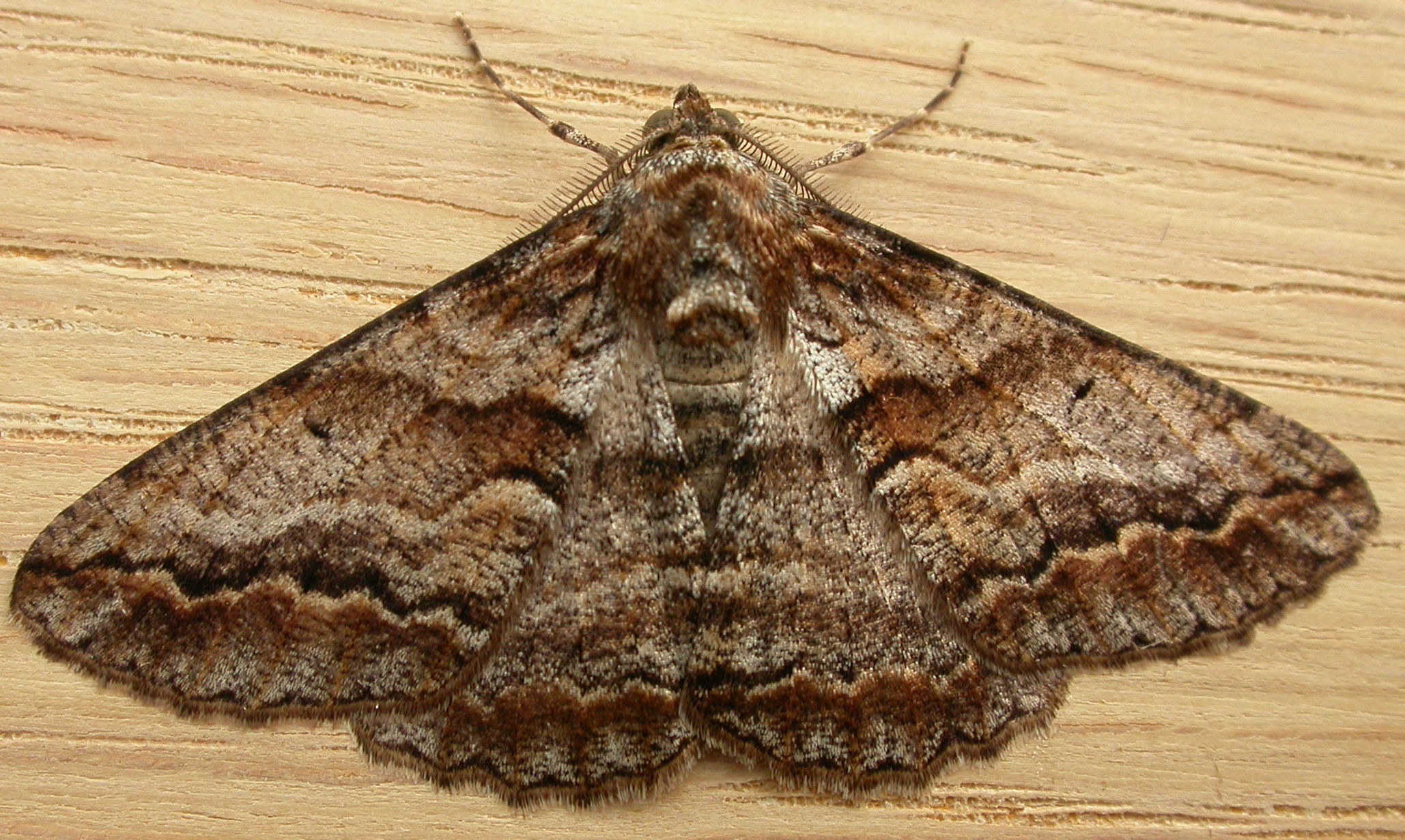

Scientific classification
- Domain: Eukaryota
- Kingdom: Animalia
- Phylum: Arthropoda
- Class: Insecta
- Order: Lepidoptera
- Family: Geometridae
- Genus: Gastrinodes
- Species: G. bitaeniaria

Binomial name
- Gastrinodes bitaeniaria (Le Guillou, 1841)

Synonyms
- Geometra bitaeniaria Le Guillou, 1841; Gastrina erebina Walker, 1860; Gastrinodes erebina (Walker, 1860)

= Gastrinodes bitaeniaria =

Species of moth

Gastrinodes bitaeniaria is a moth of the family Geometridae. It is found in Queensland, New South Wales, South Australia, Victoria and Tasmania.

The larvae feed on Eucalyptus species.
