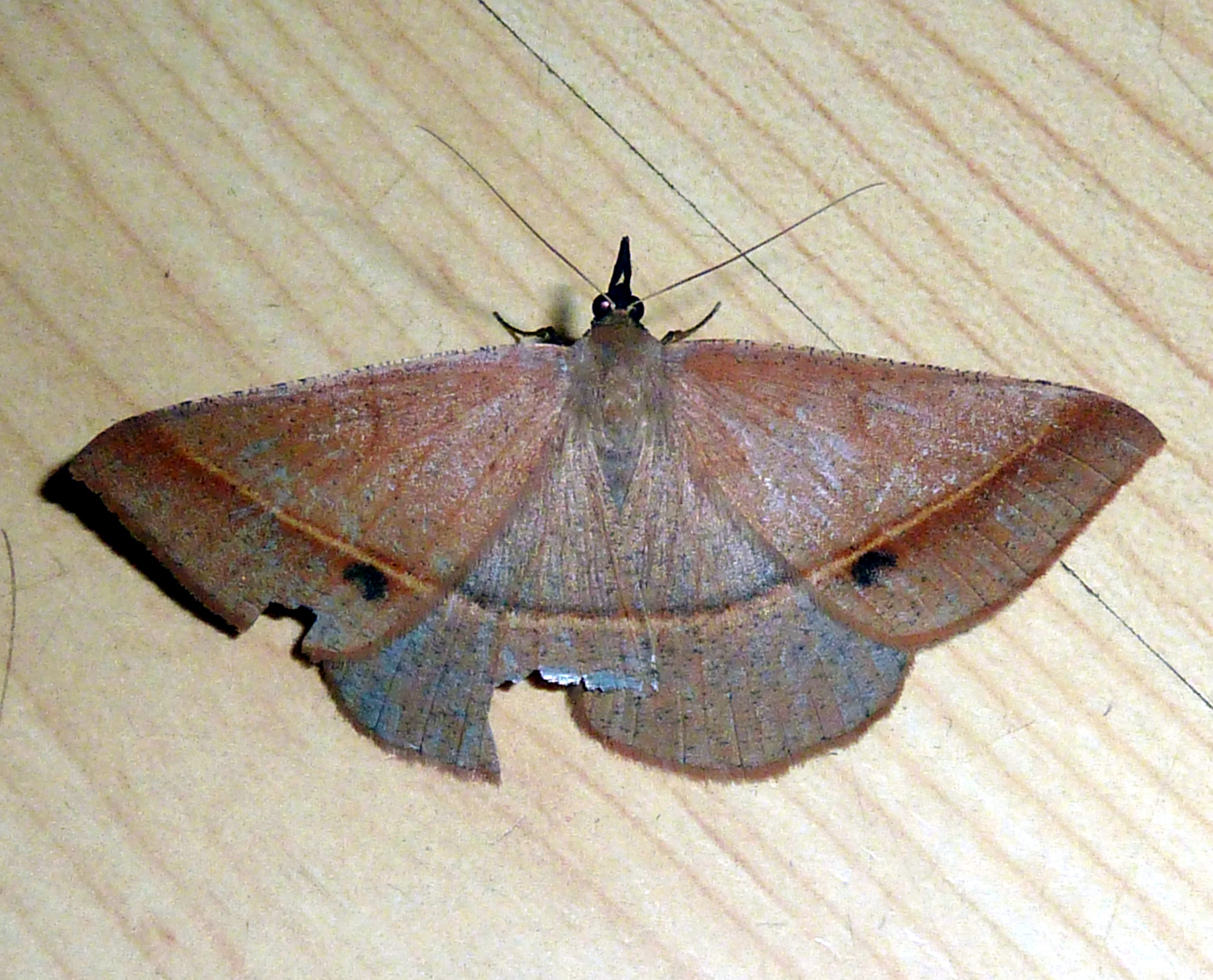
- C. aemula in South Africa

Scientific classification
- Kingdom: Animalia
- Phylum: Arthropoda
- Class: Insecta
- Order: Lepidoptera
- Family: Geometridae
- Genus: Conolophia; Warren, 1894

Synonyms
- Geoglada Swinhoe, 1894; Hypophracta Warren, 1905

= Conolophia =

Genus of moths

Conolophia is a genus of moths in the family Geometridae.

== Species ==
- Conolophia conscitaria (Walker, 1861)
- Conolophia helicola (Swinhoe, 1894)
- Conolophia melanothrix Prout, 1915
- Conolophia nigripuncta (Hampson, 1891)
- Conolophia persimilis (Warren, 1905)
