= Hypophracta =

Scientific classification
- Kingdom: Animalia
- Phylum: Arthropoda
- Class: Insecta
- Order: Lepidoptera
- Family: Geometridae
- Genus: Hypophracta

Genus of moths

Hypophracta is a genus of moths in the family Geometridae. It is considered a synonym of Conolophia.
