= Glaucina macdunnoughi =

Scientific classification
- Domain: Eukaryota
- Kingdom: Animalia
- Phylum: Arthropoda
- Class: Insecta
- Order: Lepidoptera
- Family: Geometridae
- Genus: Glaucina
- Species: G. macdunnoughi

Binomial name
- Glaucina macdunnoughi (Grossbeck, 1912)

Species of moth

Glaucina macdunnoughi is a species of geometrid moth in the family Geometridae. It is found in North America.

The MONA or Hodges number for Glaucina macdunnoughi is 6492.
