= Glenoides lenticuligera =

Scientific classification
- Domain: Eukaryota
- Kingdom: Animalia
- Phylum: Arthropoda
- Class: Insecta
- Order: Lepidoptera
- Family: Geometridae
- Tribe: Boarmiini
- Genus: Glenoides
- Species: G. lenticuligera

Binomial name
- Glenoides lenticuligera A. Blanchard, 1973

Species of moth

Glenoides lenticuligera is a species of geometrid moth in the family Geometridae. It is found in North America.

The MONA or Hodges number for Glenoides lenticuligera is 6444.
