= Gabriola minor =

Scientific classification
- Kingdom: Animalia
- Phylum: Arthropoda
- Clade: Pancrustacea
- Class: Insecta
- Order: Lepidoptera
- Family: Geometridae
- Tribe: Nacophorini
- Genus: Gabriola
- Species: G. minor

Binomial name
- Gabriola minor Rindge, 1974

Species of moth

Gabriola minor is a species of geometrid moth in the family Geometridae. It is found in North America.
