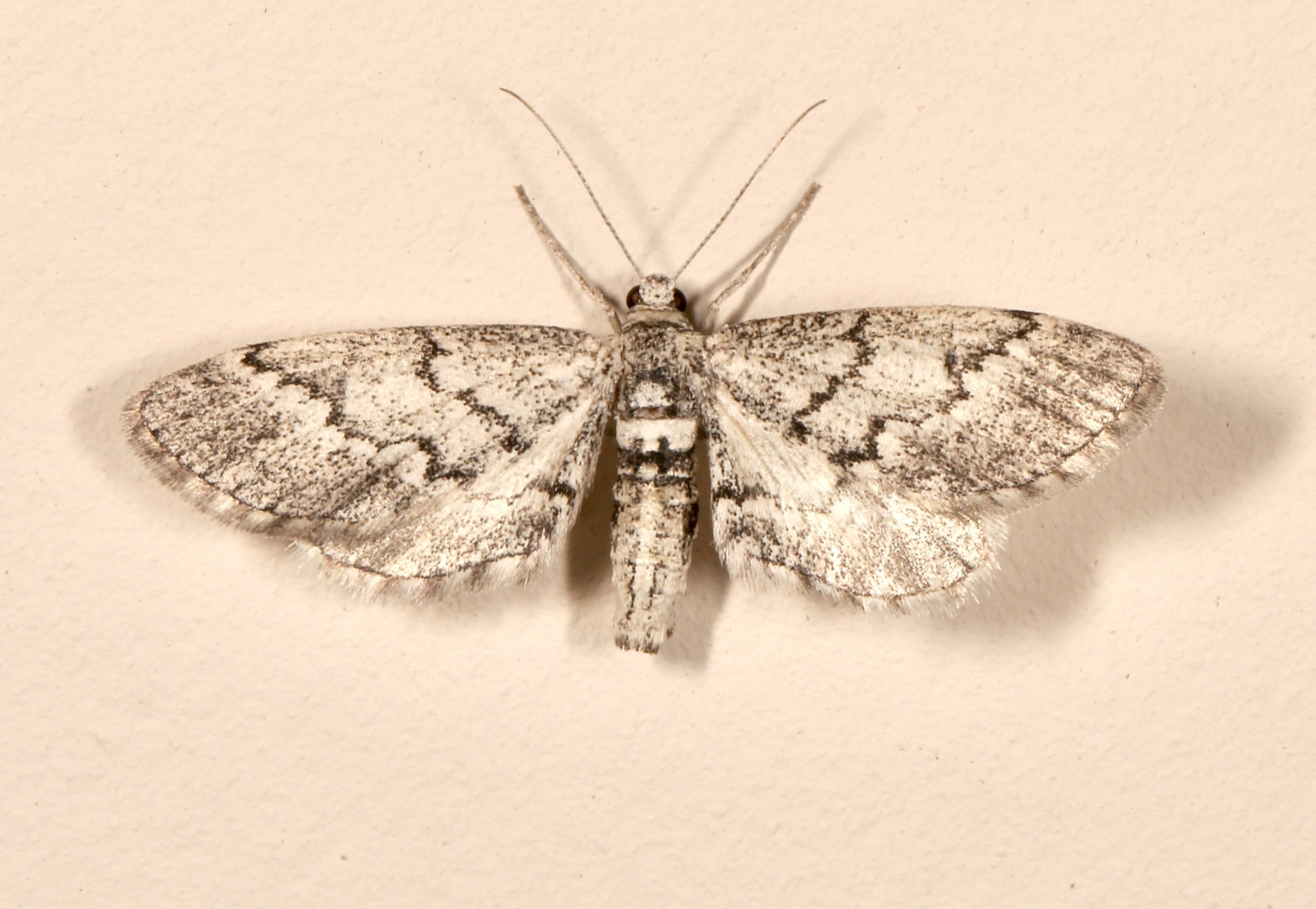
- G. eupetheciaria ssp. lucida

Scientific classification
- Domain: Eukaryota
- Kingdom: Animalia
- Phylum: Arthropoda
- Class: Insecta
- Order: Lepidoptera
- Family: Geometridae
- Genus: Glaucina
- Species: G. eupetheciaria

Binomial name
- Glaucina eupetheciaria (Grote, 1883)

= Glaucina eupetheciaria =

Species of moth

Glaucina eupetheciaria is a species of geometrid moth in the family Geometridae. It is found in Central America and North America.

== Subspecies ==
These four subspecies belong to the species Glaucina eupetheciaria:

- Glaucina eupetheciaria escariola Rindge, 1959
- Glaucina eupetheciaria eupetheciaria
- Glaucina eupetheciaria lucida Rindge, 1959
- Glaucina eupetheciaria osiana Druce, 1893
