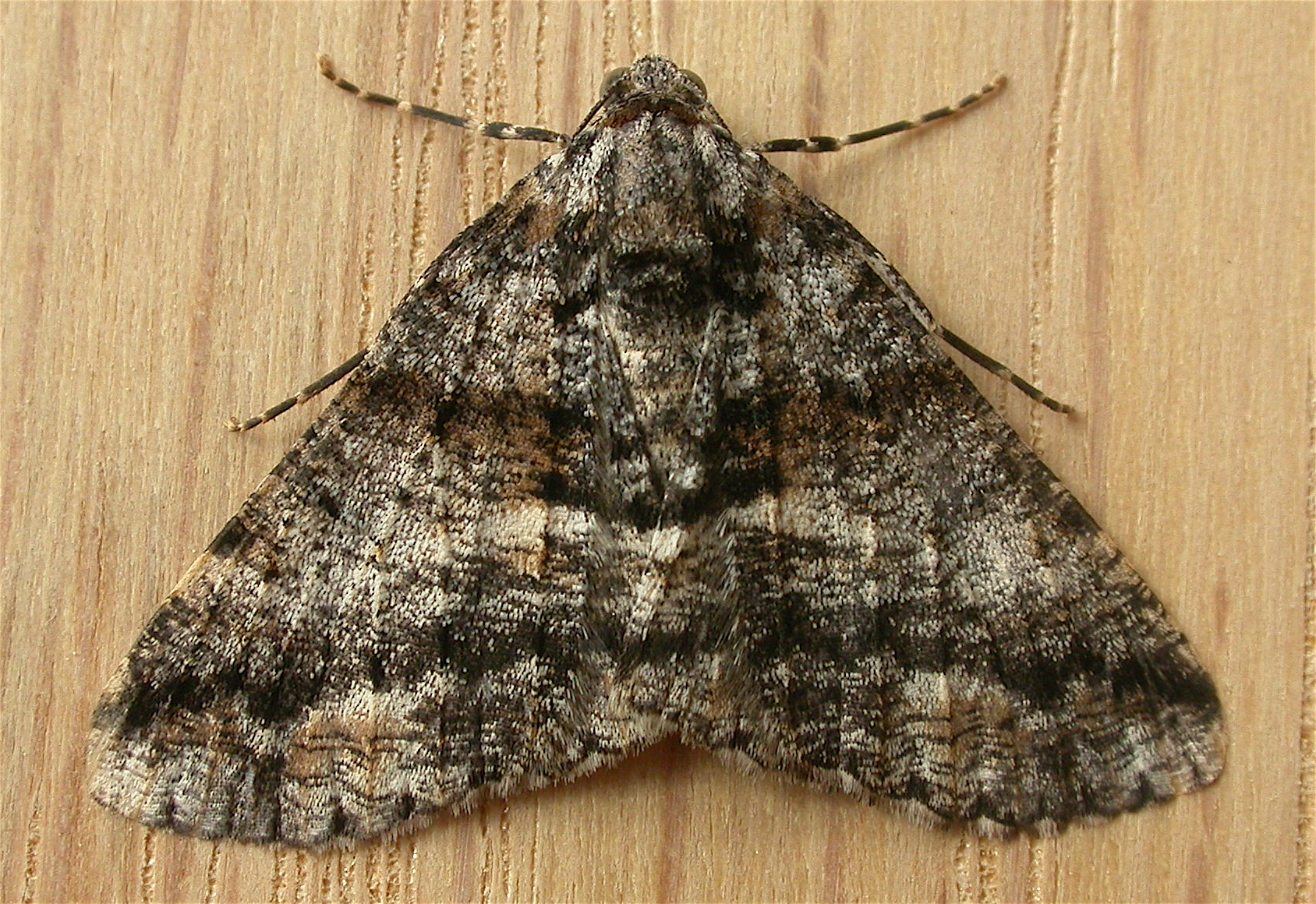

Scientific classification
- Kingdom: Animalia
- Phylum: Arthropoda
- Class: Insecta
- Order: Lepidoptera
- Family: Geometridae
- Genus: Gastrinodes
- Species: G. argoplaca

Binomial name
- Gastrinodes argoplaca Meyrick, 1888

= Gastrinodes argoplaca =

Species of moth

Gastrinodes argoplaca is a moth of the family Geometridae. It is found in Australia.
