= Edward Graef =

American wine merchant and amateur entomologist

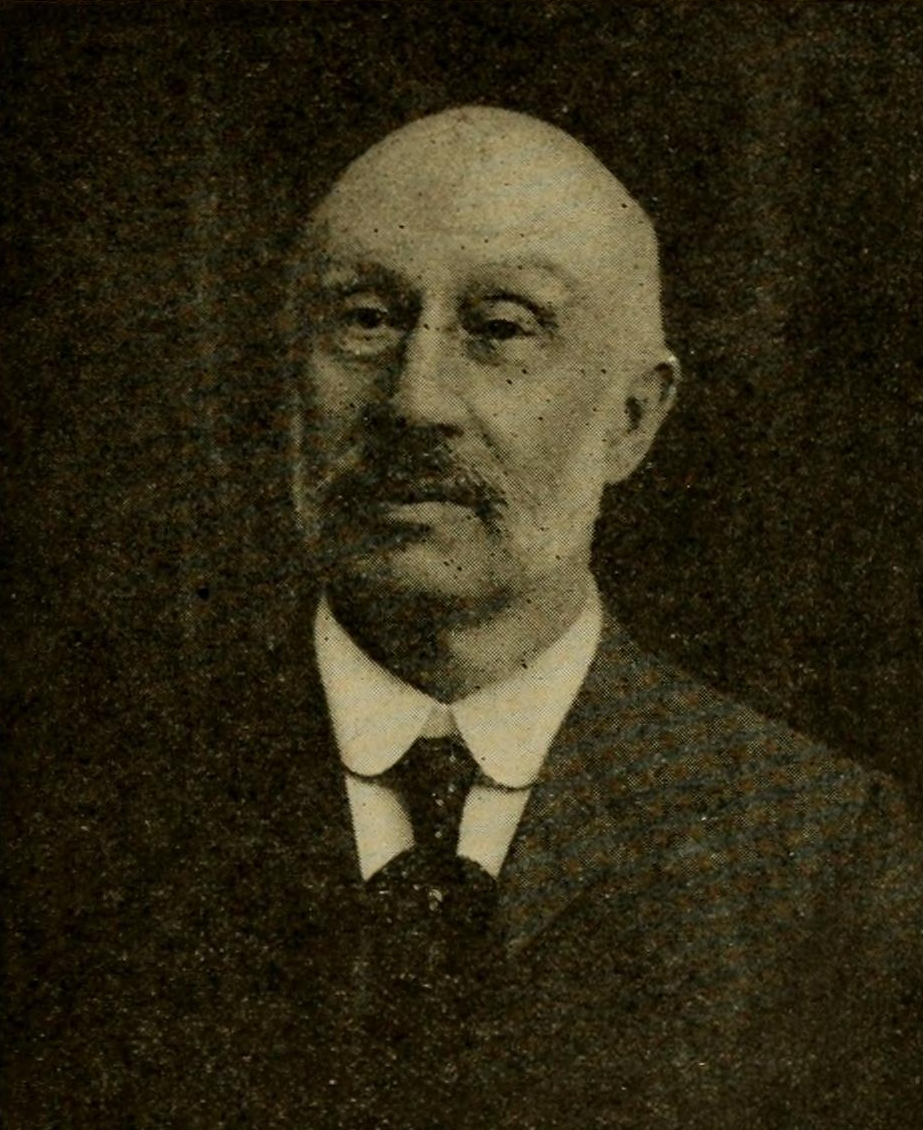

Edward Louis Graef (8 February 1842 – 15 February 1922) was an American wine merchant and amateur entomologist who was one of the founding members of the Brooklyn Entomological Society. The moth genus Graefia was named in his honour although it is no longer valid.

== Life and work ==
Graef was born in Aix-la-Chapelle and his father Henry A. Graef immigrated with his family to New York in 1848 settling at Yellow Hook (now Bay Ridge, Brooklyn) first a florist. Graef was educated at the Trinity school where he was taught by Charles Joseph Deghuee between 1853 and 1858 where he became a friend of Frederick Tepper and Augustus Grote, all of them taking an early interest in insect collections. Along with other family members, Graef established a wine import business at 58 Court Street, Brooklyn. In 1876 he attended the first meeting of the Brooklyn Entomological Society at the home of Franz G. Schaupp and Graef was elected treasurer for the society. In 1900 he gifted his collections of 10,000 specimens to the Brooklyn Museum. He was married to Minnie Witte.
