= Iotaphora iridicolor =

Scientific classification
- Kingdom: Animalia
- Phylum: Arthropoda
- Class: Insecta
- Order: Lepidoptera
- Family: Geometridae
- Subfamily: Geometrinae
- Genus: Iotaphora
- Species: I. iridicolor

Binomial name
- Iotaphora iridicolor (Butler, 1880)

Synonyms
- Panaethia iridicolor Butler, 1880

Species of moth

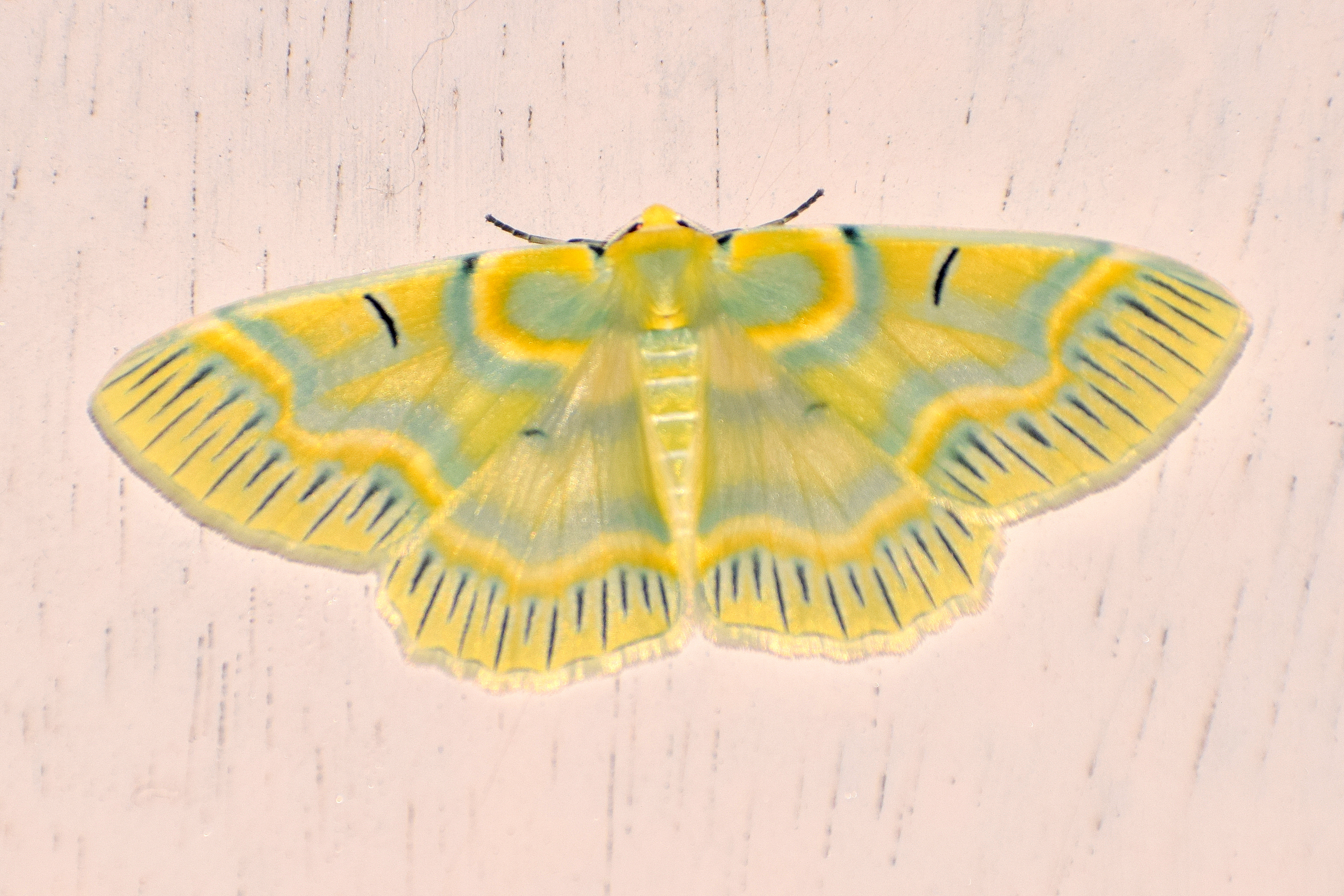
Iotaphora iridicolor (Butler, 1880)

Iotaphora iridicolor is a species of moth of the family Geometridae found in China, India, and Bhutan.
