= Glaucina escaria =

Scientific classification
- Kingdom: Animalia
- Phylum: Arthropoda
- Clade: Pancrustacea
- Class: Insecta
- Order: Lepidoptera
- Family: Geometridae
- Genus: Glaucina
- Species: G. escaria

Binomial name
- Glaucina escaria (Grotte, 1882)

Species of moth

Glaucina escaria is a species of geometrid moth in the family Geometridae. It is found in North America.

The MONA or Hodges number for Glaucina escaria is 6495.
