= Glaucina lowensis =

Scientific classification
- Domain: Eukaryota
- Kingdom: Animalia
- Phylum: Arthropoda
- Class: Insecta
- Order: Lepidoptera
- Family: Geometridae
- Genus: Glaucina
- Species: G. lowensis

Binomial name
- Glaucina lowensis (Cassino & Swett, 1925)

Species of moth

Glaucina lowensis is a species of geometrid moth in the family Geometridae. It is found in North America.

The MONA or Hodges number for Glaucina lowensis is 6509.
