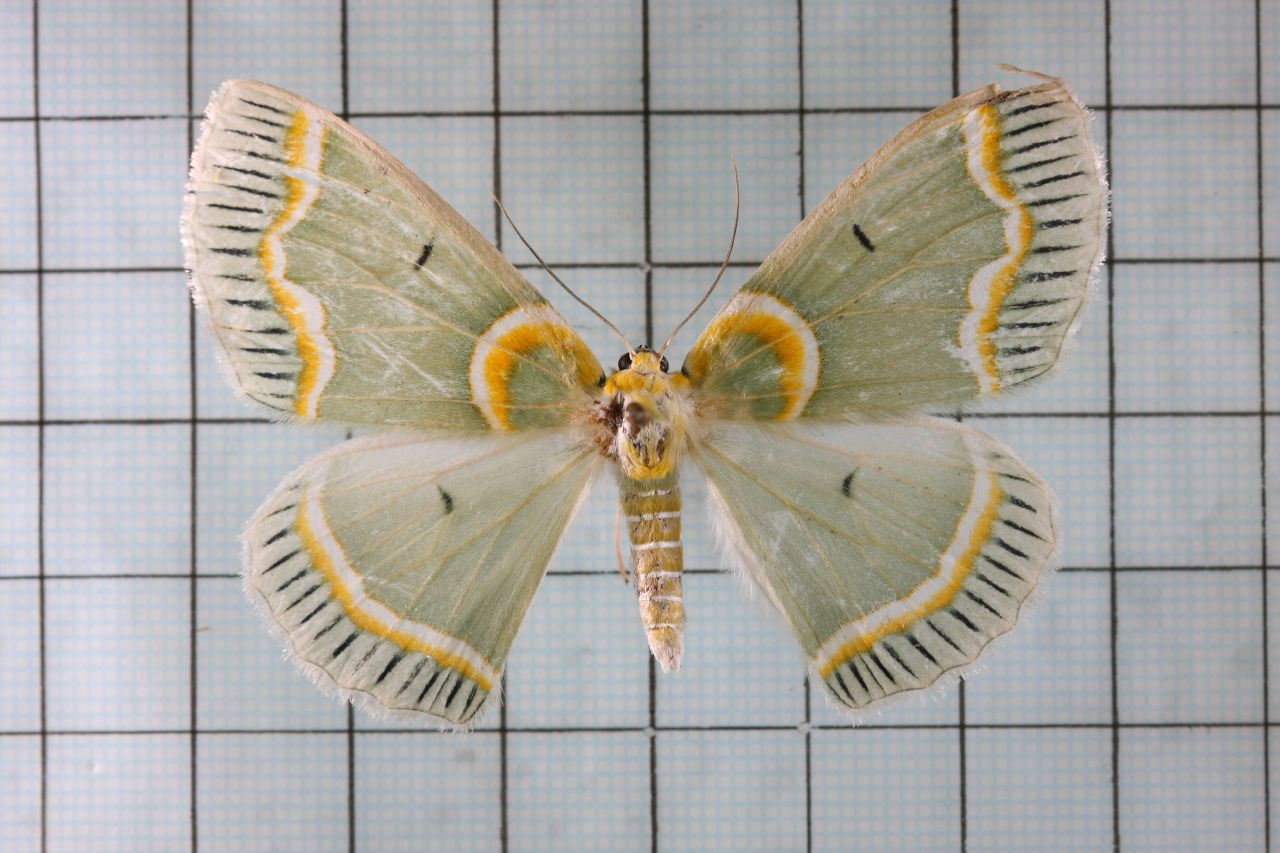

Scientific classification
- Domain: Eukaryota
- Kingdom: Animalia
- Phylum: Arthropoda
- Class: Insecta
- Order: Lepidoptera
- Family: Geometridae
- Subfamily: Geometrinae
- Genus: Iotaphora
- Species: I. admirabilis

Binomial name
- Iotaphora admirabilis (Oberthur, 1884)

Synonyms
- Metrocampa admirabilis Oberthur, 1884

= Iotaphora admirabilis =

Species of moth

Iotaphora admirabilis is a species of moth in the family Geometridae first described by Charles Oberthür in 1884. It is found in south-eastern Siberia, Korea and Taiwan.
