= Gonanticlea occlusata =

Scientific classification
- Domain: Eukaryota
- Kingdom: Animalia
- Phylum: Arthropoda
- Class: Insecta
- Order: Lepidoptera
- Family: Geometridae
- Genus: Gonanticlea
- Species: G. occlusata

Binomial name
- Gonanticlea occlusata (Felder, 1875)

Synonyms
- Cidaria occlusata Felder & Rogenhofer, 1875

Species of moth

Gonanticlea occlusata is a moth of the family Geometridae first described by Felder in 1875. It is found in the north-eastern Himalayas of India, Sri Lanka, Tonkin, Peninsular Malaysia and Borneo.

In females, the broad border to the medial bar is straight. The forewings of the male are a much darker green, whereas the female has a few greenish patches only. The hindwings of both sexes are yellowish.

Two subspecies are recognized.

- Gonanticlea occlusata kinabalensis Prout, 1939 - Borneo
- Gonanticlea occlusata laetifica Prout, 1931 - Tonkin
