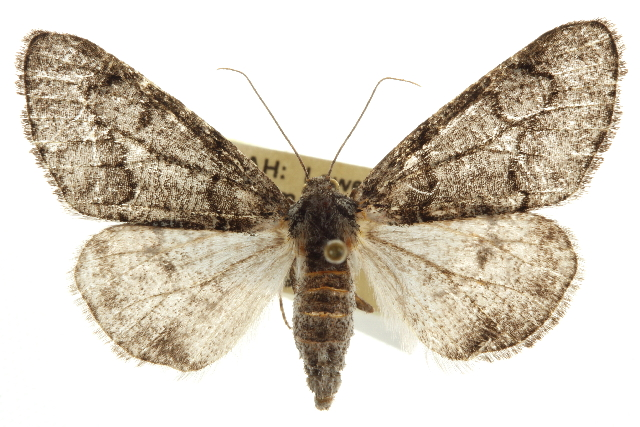

Scientific classification
- Kingdom: Animalia
- Phylum: Arthropoda
- Clade: Pancrustacea
- Class: Insecta
- Order: Lepidoptera
- Family: Geometridae
- Genus: Gabriola
- Species: G. minima

Binomial name
- Gabriola minima (Hulst, 1896)

= Gabriola minima =

Species of moth

Gabriola minima is a species of geometrid moth in the family Geometridae. It is found in North America.

The MONA or Hodges number for Gabriola minima is 6783.
