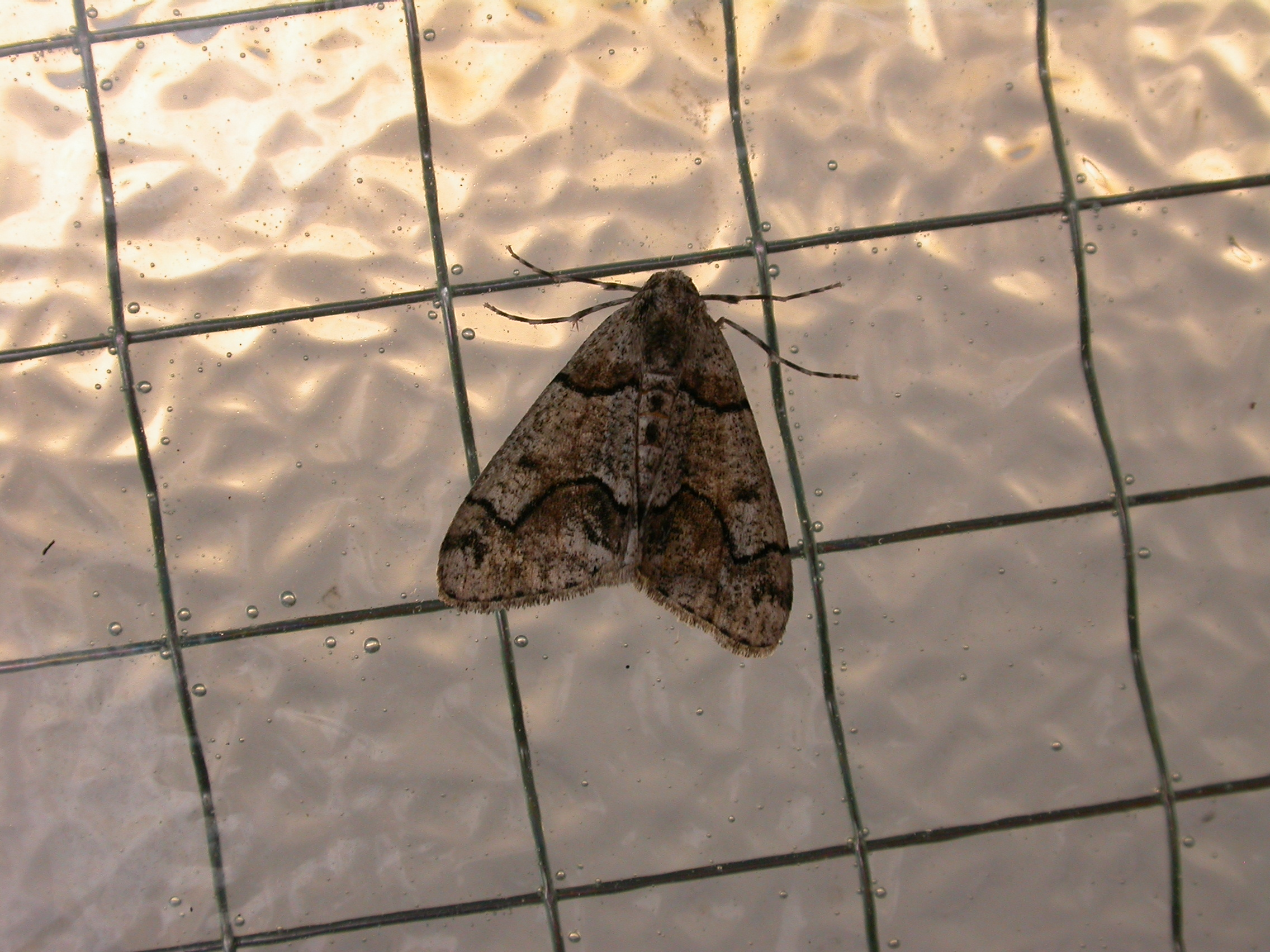

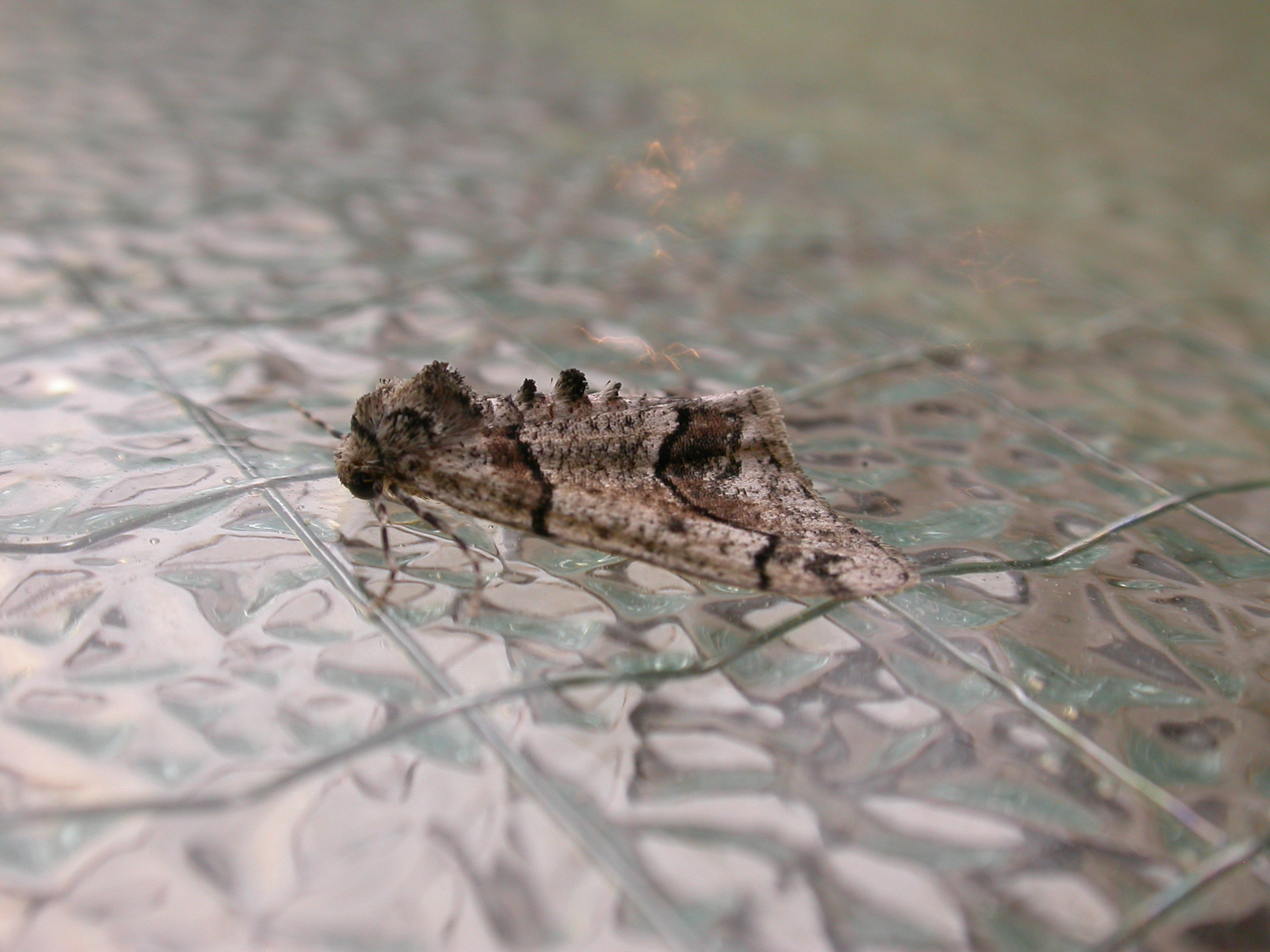

Scientific classification
- Kingdom: Animalia
- Phylum: Arthropoda
- Clade: Pancrustacea
- Class: Insecta
- Order: Lepidoptera
- Family: Geometridae
- Genus: Gabriola
- Species: G. dyari

Binomial name
- Gabriola dyari Taylor, 1904

Synonyms
- Gabriola bakeri Rindge, 1974; Gabriola pruina Rindge, 1974

= Gabriola dyari =

Species of moth

Gabriola dyari, or Dyar's looper, is a moth of the family Geometridae first described by Taylor in 1904. It is found from the Alaskan panhandle and British Columbia to California. The habitat consists of coniferous forests.

The wingspan is 25–30 mm.
