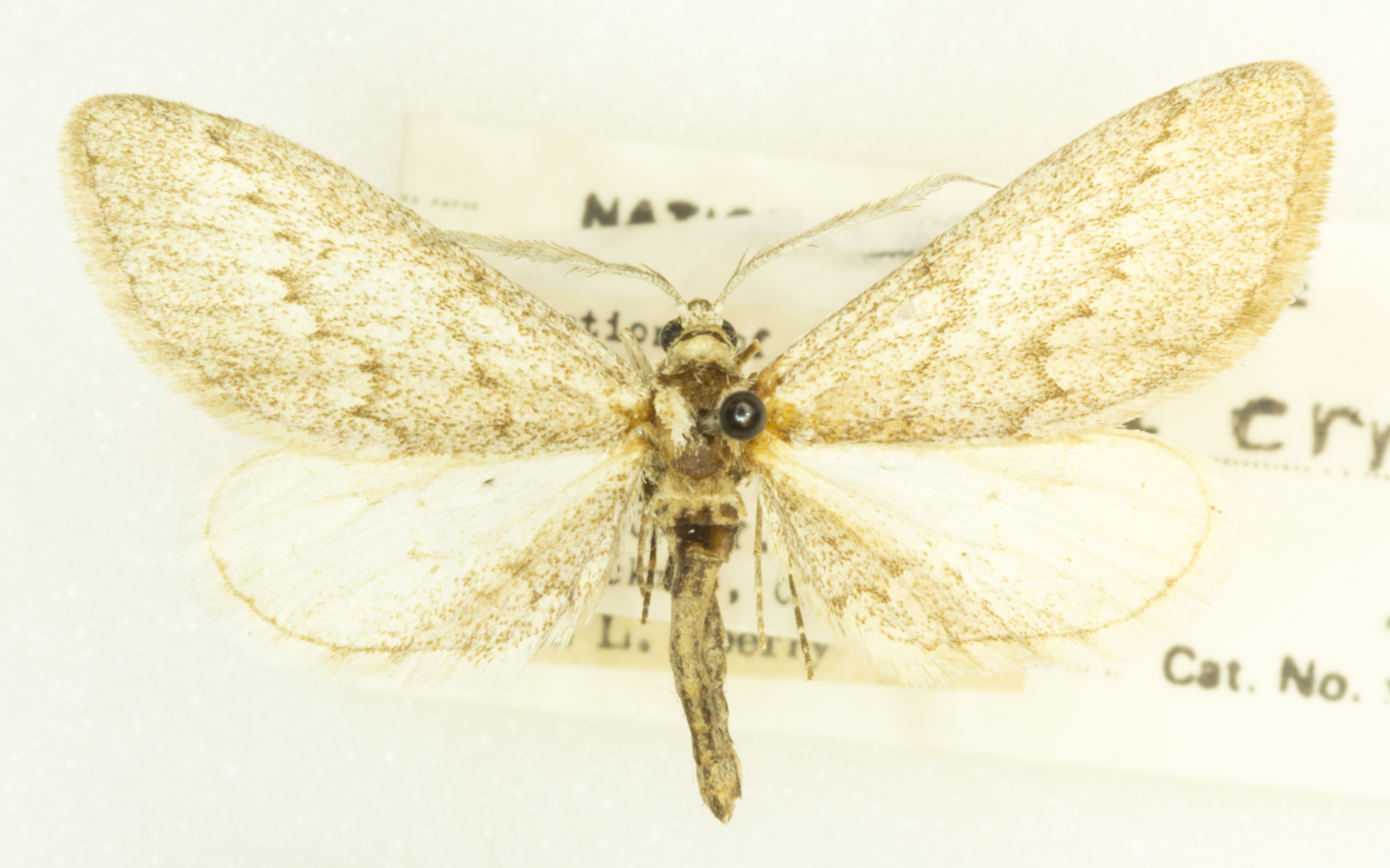

Scientific classification
- Kingdom: Animalia
- Phylum: Arthropoda
- Clade: Pancrustacea
- Class: Insecta
- Order: Lepidoptera
- Family: Geometridae
- Genus: Glaucina
- Species: G. erroraria

Binomial name
- Glaucina erroraria Dyar, 1907

= Glaucina erroraria =

Species of moth

Glaucina erroraria is a species of geometrid moth in the family Geometridae. It is found in North America.

The MONA or Hodges number for Glaucina erroraria is 6488.
