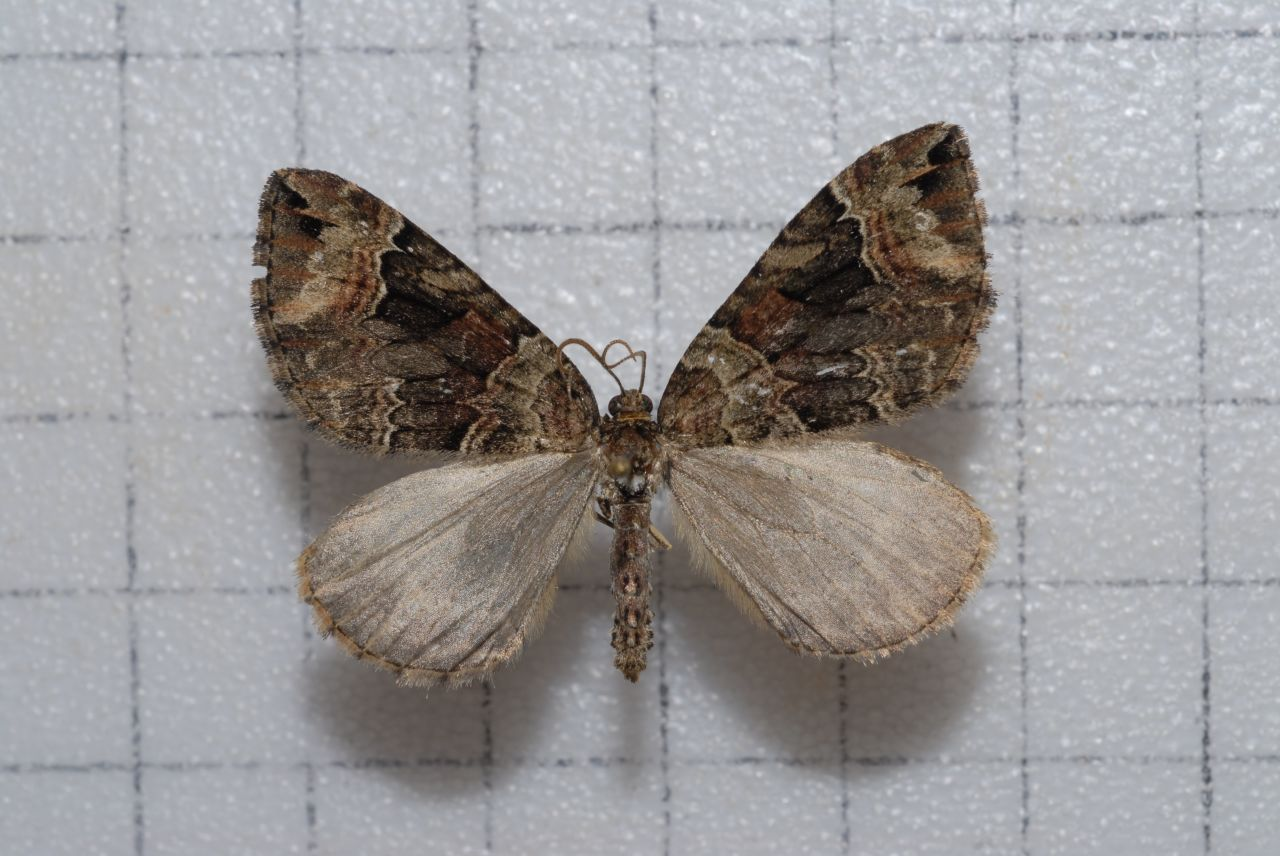
- Gonanticlea ochreivittata

Scientific classification
- Domain: Eukaryota
- Kingdom: Animalia
- Phylum: Arthropoda
- Class: Insecta
- Order: Lepidoptera
- Family: Geometridae
- Subfamily: Larentiinae
- Genus: Gonanticlea; Swinhoe, 1892

= Gonanticlea =

Genus of moths

Gonanticlea is a genus of moths in the family Geometridae first described by Charles Swinhoe in 1892.

== Description ==
Palpi having second joint reaching well beyond the frontal tuft, where the third joint prominent. Antennae of male ciliated. Forewings with slightly dentate outer margin below apex and angled at vein 4. Hindwings with slightly angled outer margin at vein 4. Vein 5 from below middle of discocellulars, which are angled.

== Selected species ==
- Gonanticlea occlusata (Felder, 1875)
- Gonanticlea ochreivittata (Bastelberger, 1909)
