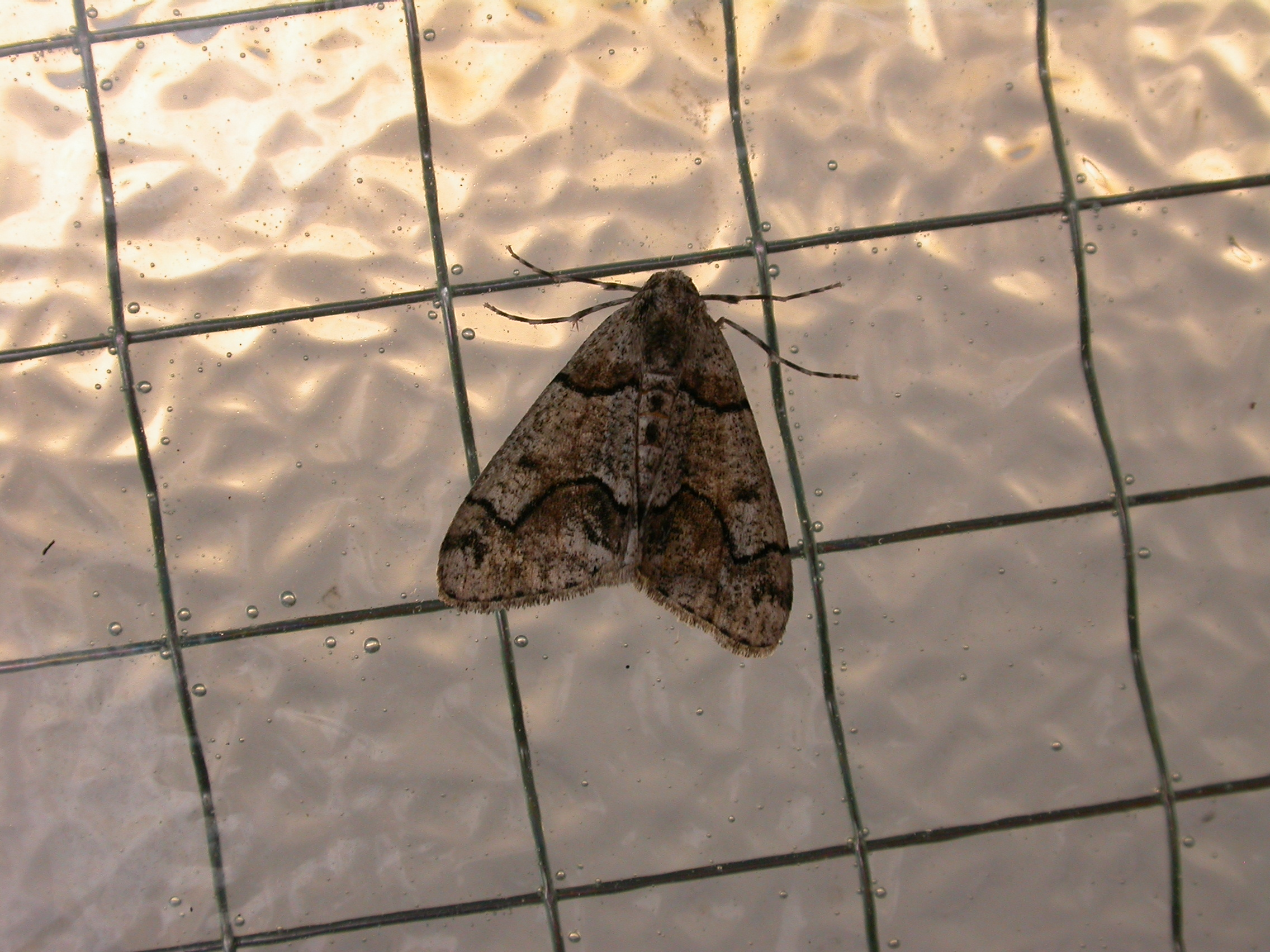
- Gabriola dyari

Scientific classification
- Domain: Eukaryota
- Kingdom: Animalia
- Phylum: Arthropoda
- Class: Insecta
- Order: Lepidoptera
- Family: Geometridae
- Subfamily: Ennominae
- Tribe: Nacophorini
- Genus: Gabriola; Taylor, 1904

= Gabriola (moth) =

Genus of moths

Gabriola is a genus of moth in the family Geometridae.

== Species ==
- Gabriola dyari Taylor, 1904
- Gabriola minima (Hulst, 1896)
- Gabriola minor Rindge, 1974
- Gabriola regularia McDunnough, 1945
- Gabriola sierrae McDunnough, 1945
- Gabriola tenuis Rindge, 1974
