= Gnophopsodos =

Scientific classification
- Kingdom: Animalia
- Phylum: Arthropoda
- Clade: Pancrustacea
- Class: Insecta
- Order: Lepidoptera
- Family: Geometridae
- Genus: Gnophopsodos

Genus of moths

Gnophopsodos is a genus of moths in the family Geometridae.
