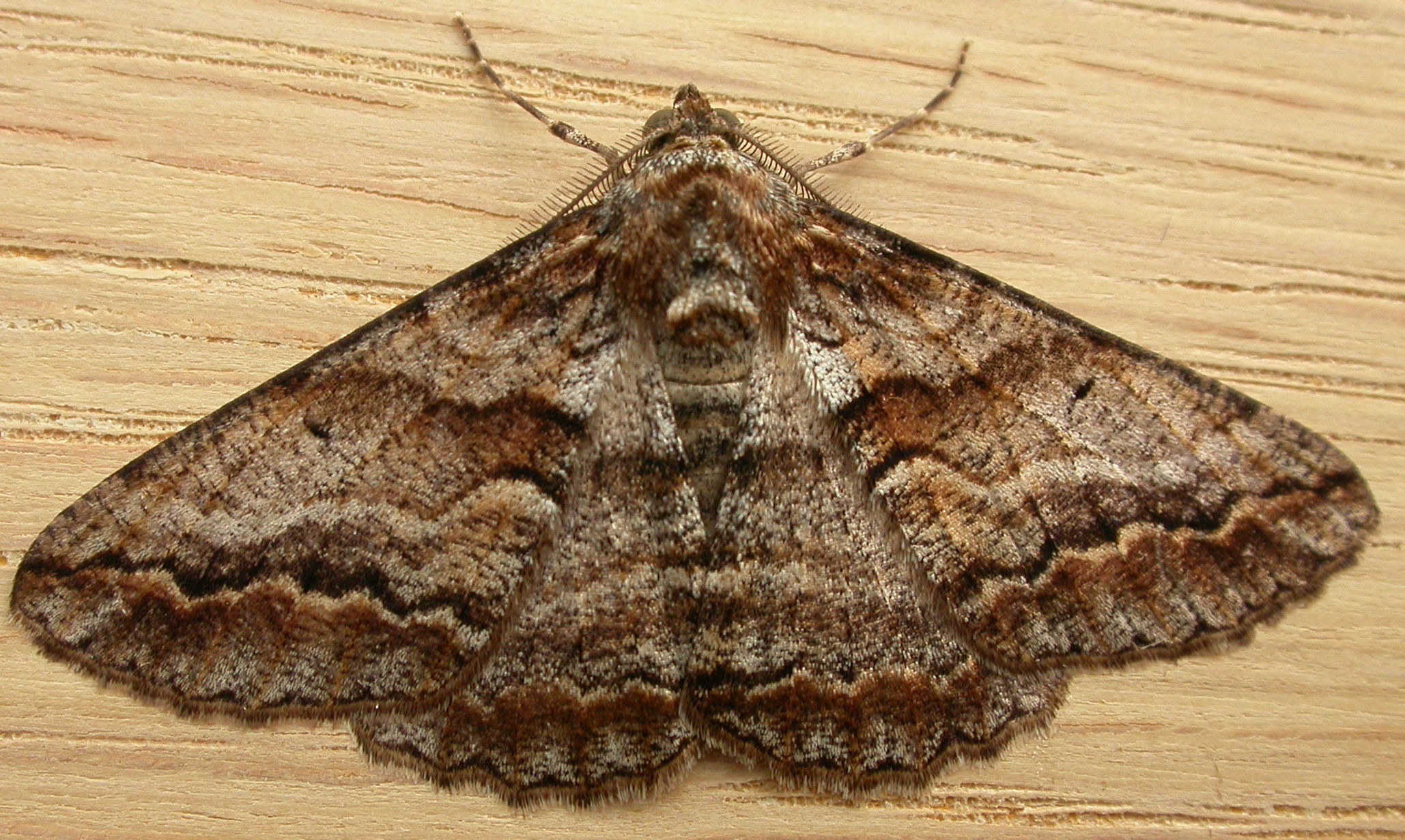
- G. bitaeniaria, the type species

Scientific classification
- Domain: Eukaryota
- Kingdom: Animalia
- Phylum: Arthropoda
- Class: Insecta
- Order: Lepidoptera
- Family: Geometridae
- Tribe: Boarmiini
- Genus: Gastrinodes; Warren, 1898

Synonyms
- Heteroptila Turner, 1917

= Gastrinodes =

Genus of moths

Gastrinodes is a genus of moths in the family Geometridae erected by William Warren in 1898. Its species occur in Australia. Its type species is G. bitaeniaria, originally described as Geometra bitaeniaria.

== Species ==
- Gastrinodes argoplaca (Le Guillou, 1841)
- Gastrinodes bitaeniaria (Meyrick, 1892)
