= Gonora =

Scientific classification
- Kingdom: Animalia
- Phylum: Arthropoda
- Clade: Pancrustacea
- Class: Insecta
- Order: Lepidoptera
- Family: Geometridae
- Subfamily: Ennominae
- Genus: Gonora; Walker, 1865

Genus of moths

Gonora is a genus of moths in the family Geometridae. They occur in South America.

== Species ==
There are four or five species:

- Gonora clio (Hübner, 1819)
- Gonora hyelosioides Walker, 1862
- Gonora paphia Druce, 1893
- Gonora puhites Druce, 1885
- Gonora vitrina Druce, 1886
