= Graefia =

Scientific classification
- Kingdom: Animalia
- Phylum: Arthropoda
- Clade: Pancrustacea
- Class: Insecta
- Order: Lepidoptera
- Family: Geometridae
- Genus: Graefia; Pearsall, 1910

Genus of moths

Graefia is a genus of moths in the family Geometridae. The genus is named after Edward Louis Graef with the type being G. smithii. The genus is now considered a synonym of Animomyia.
