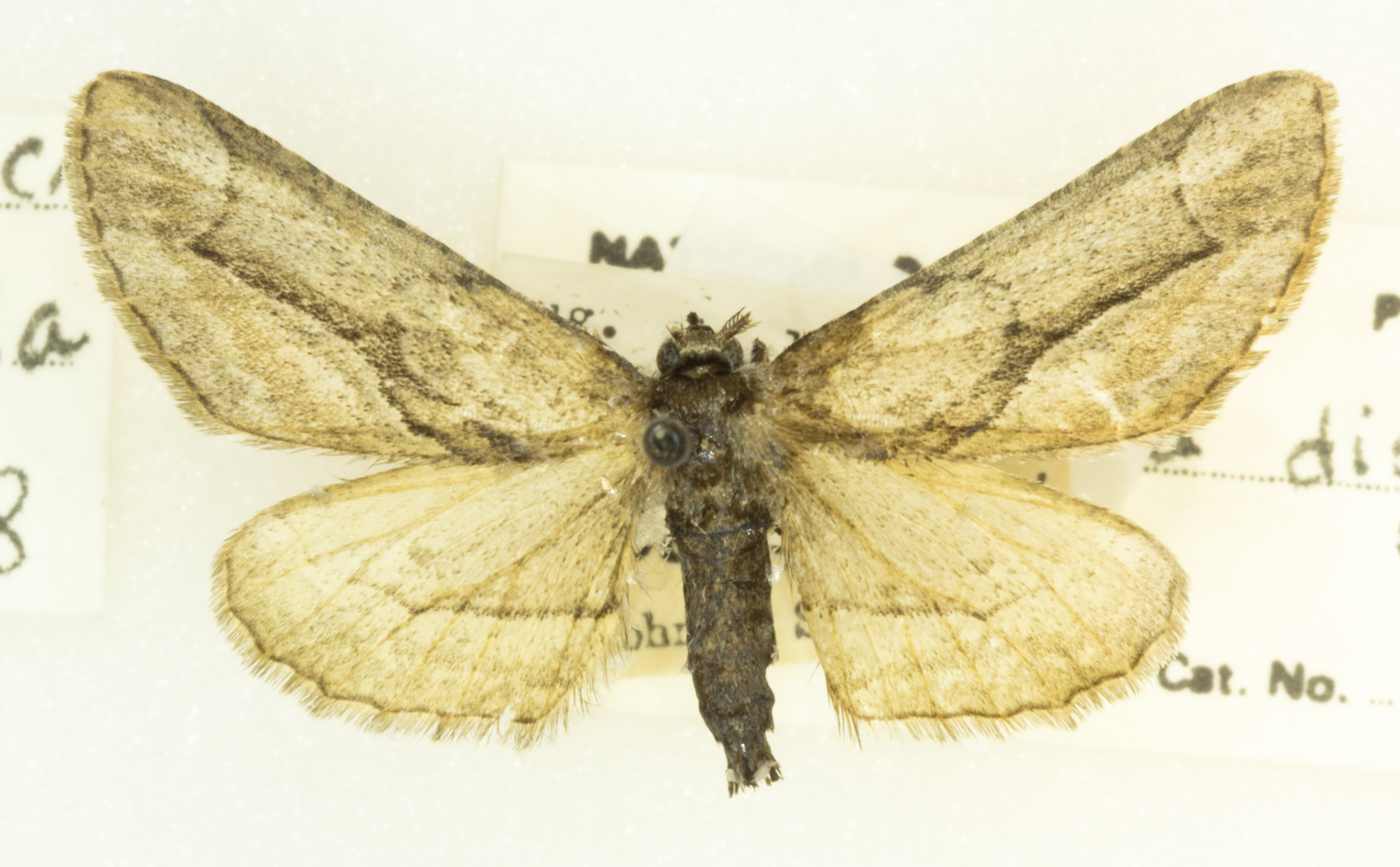

Scientific classification
- Kingdom: Animalia
- Phylum: Arthropoda
- Class: Insecta
- Order: Lepidoptera
- Family: Geometridae
- Genus: Holochroa; Hulst, 1896
- Species: H. dissociarius

Binomial name
- Holochroa dissociarius (Hulst, 1887)

Synonyms
- Gloduria Dyar, 1924

= Holochroa =

Genus of moths

Holochroa is a moth genus in the family Geometridae. Its type species, Holochroa dissociarius, is found in North America. The species was described by George Duryea Hulst in 1887 and he described the genus nine years later in 1896.

== Subspecies ==
There are two subspecies:

- Holochroa dissociarius dissociarius^{g}
- Holochroa dissociarius varia Rindge, 1961^{c g b}

Data sources: i = ITIS, c = Catalogue of Life, g = GBIF, b = BugGuide
