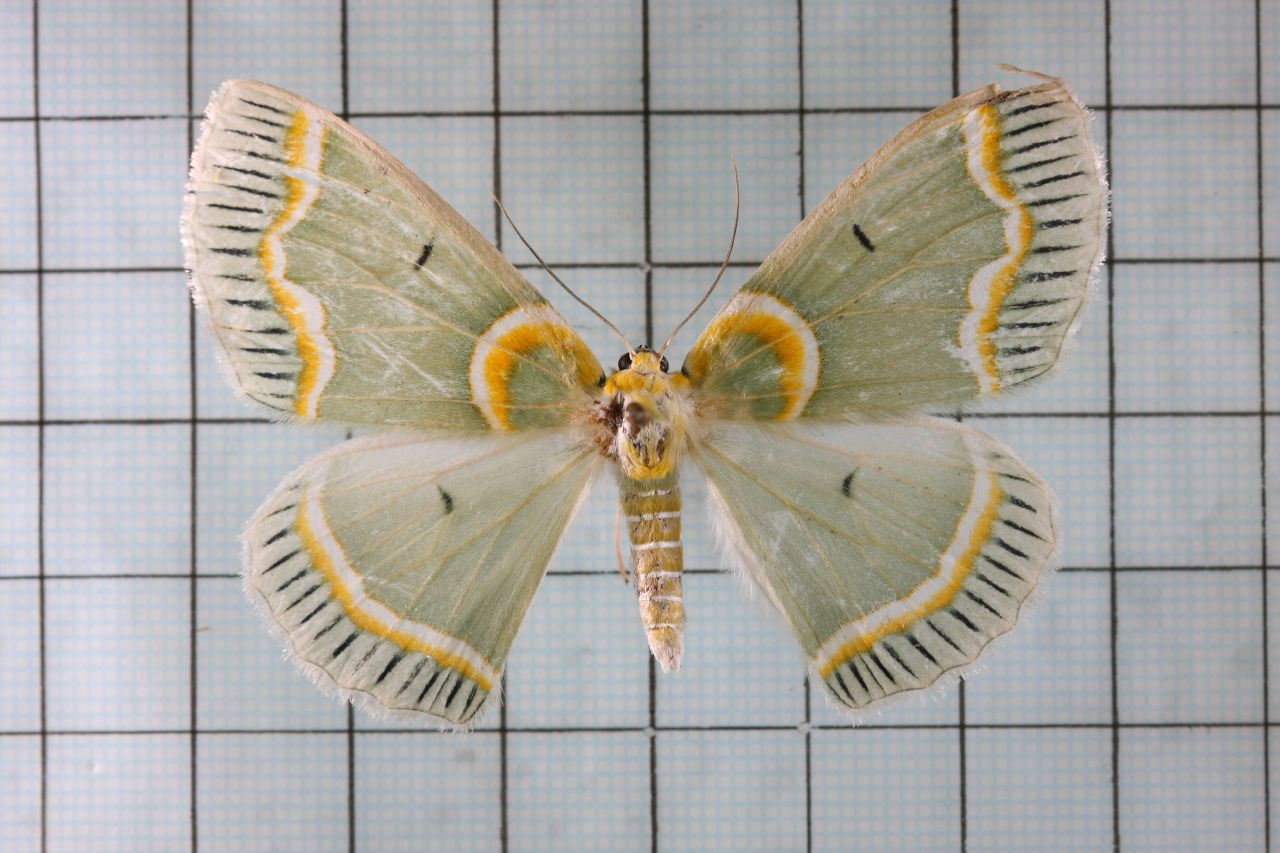
- Iotaphora admirabilis

Scientific classification
- Kingdom: Animalia
- Phylum: Arthropoda
- Class: Insecta
- Order: Lepidoptera
- Family: Geometridae
- Subfamily: Geometrinae
- Genus: Iotaphora; Warren, 1894

Synonyms
- Grammicheila Staudinger, 1897; Iotaphora Swinhoe, 1894

= Iotaphora =

Genus of moths

Iotaphora is a genus of moths in the family Geometridae. There are at least two described species in Iotaphora, found in southern and eastern Asia.

== Species ==
- Iotaphora admirabilis (Oberthur, 1884)
- Iotaphora iridicolor (Butler, 1880)
