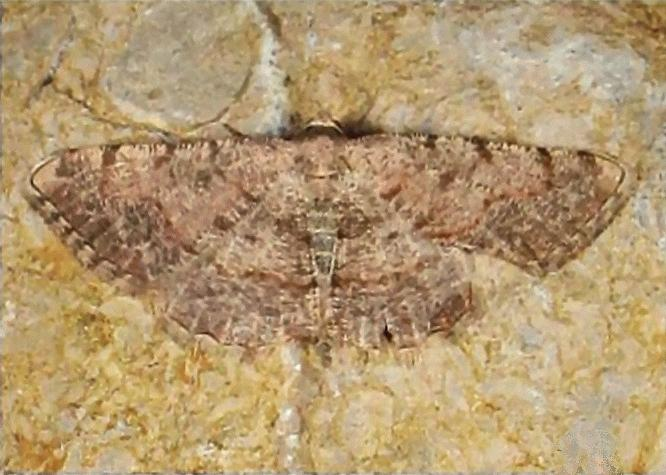
- Gnopharmia colchidaria

Scientific classification
- Kingdom: Animalia
- Phylum: Arthropoda
- Class: Insecta
- Order: Lepidoptera
- Family: Geometridae
- Genus: Gnopharmia; Staudinger, 1892

= Gnopharmia =

Genus of moths

Gnopharmia is a genus of moths in the family Geometridae.

== Species ==
The following species are recognised in the genus Gnopharmia:

- Gnopharmia cataleucaria (Staudinger, 1901)
- Gnopharmia colchidaria (Lederer, 1870)
- Gnopharmia eberti Wiltshire, 1967
- Gnopharmia erema Wehrli, 1939
- Gnopharmia horhammeri (Brandt, 1938)
- Gnopharmia inermis Wiltshire, 1967
- Gnopharmia irakensis Wehrli, 1938
- Gnopharmia kasrunensis Wehrli, 1939
- Gnopharmia maculifera Staudinger, 1892
- Gnopharmia objectaria Staudinger, 1892
- Gnopharmia rubraria Staudinger, 1892
- Gnopharmia sarobiana Ebert, 1965
- Gnopharmia sinesefida Wehrli, 1941
