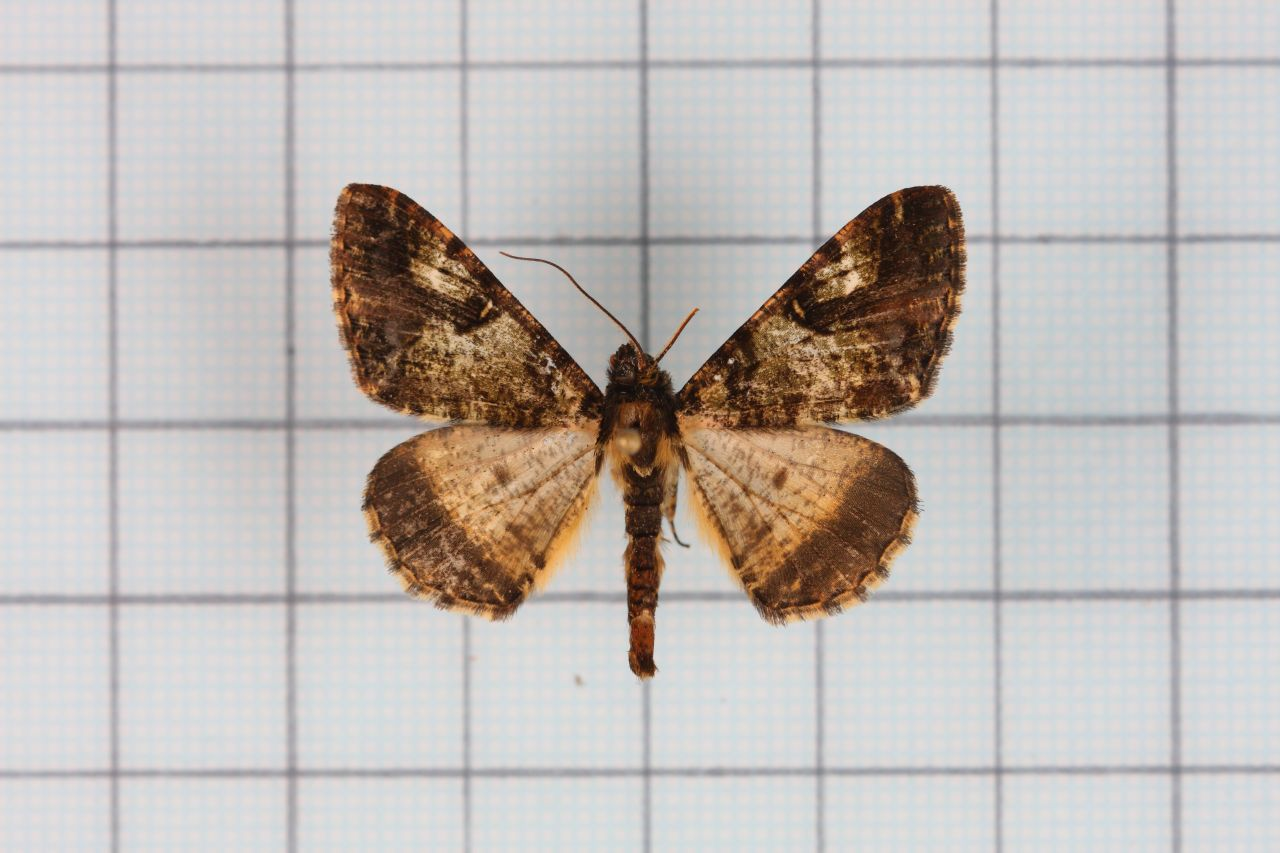
- Gasterocome pannosaria

Scientific classification
- Kingdom: Animalia
- Phylum: Arthropoda
- Clade: Pancrustacea
- Class: Insecta
- Order: Lepidoptera
- Family: Geometridae
- Tribe: Boarmiini
- Genus: Gasterocome; Warren, 1894

= Gasterocome =

Genus of moths

Gasterocome is a genus of moths in the family Geometridae. It was described by William Warren in 1894.

== Species ==
There are four accepted species:

- Gasterocome fidoniaria (Snellen, 1881)
- Gasterocome inouei Sato, 2002
- Gasterocome pannosaria (Moore, 1868)
- Gasterocome polyspathes Prout, 1934
