= Galenara =

Scientific classification
- Kingdom: Animalia
- Phylum: Arthropoda
- Class: Insecta
- Order: Lepidoptera
- Family: Geometridae
- Tribe: Melanolophiini
- Genus: Galenara; McDunnough, 1920

Genus of moths

Galenara is a genus of moths in the family Geometridae described by James Halliday McDunnough in 1920.

== Species ==
- Galenara consimilis Heinrich, 1931
- Galenara lallata (Hulst, 1898)
- Galenara glaucaria (Grossbeck, 1912)
- Galenara lixaria (Grote, 1883)
- Galenara lixarioides McDunnough, 1945
- Galenara stenomacra Rindge, 1958
- Galenara olivacea Rindge, 1958

== Distribution ==
China.
