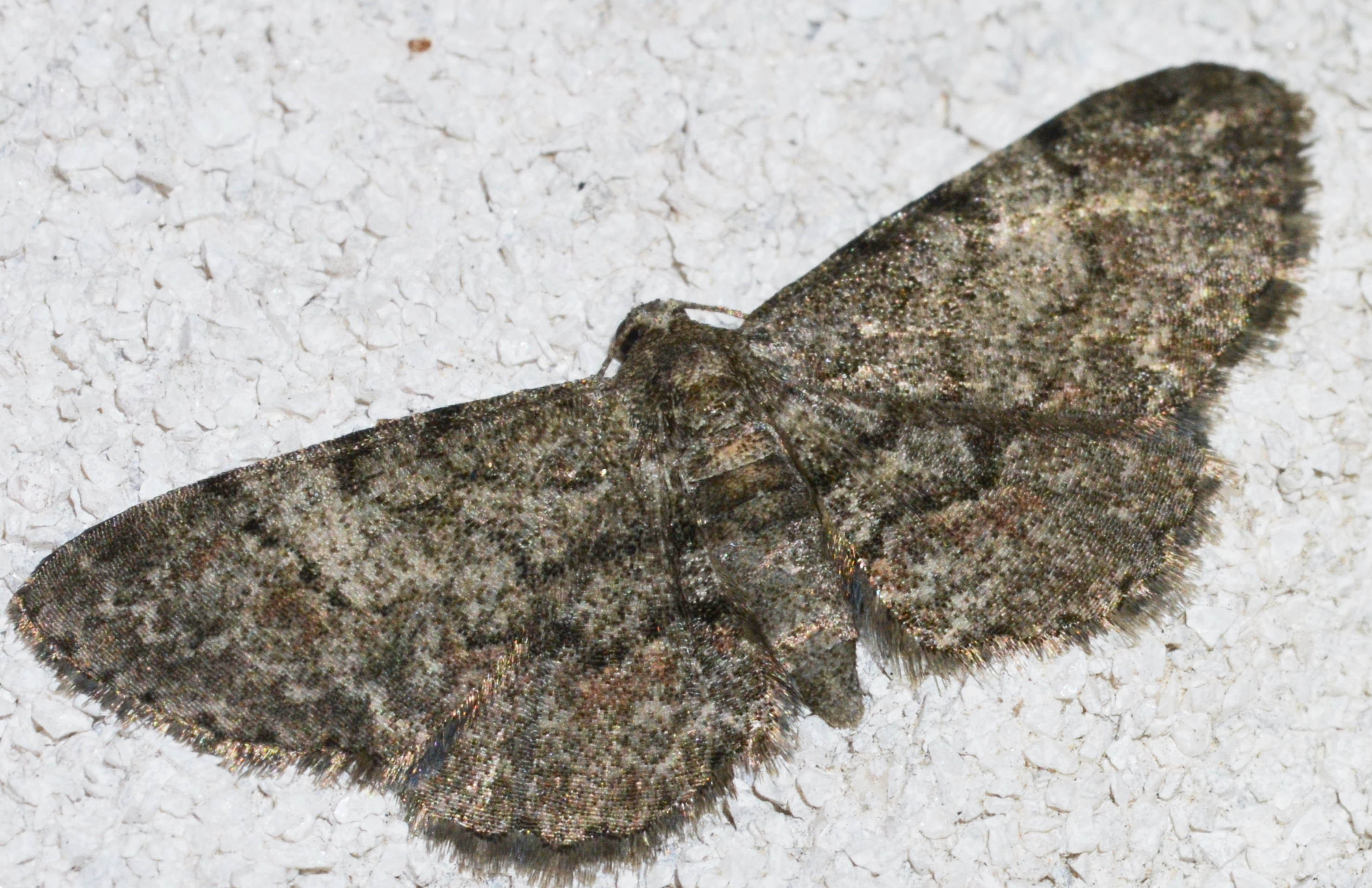
- Glenoides texanaria

Scientific classification
- Domain: Eukaryota
- Kingdom: Animalia
- Phylum: Arthropoda
- Class: Insecta
- Order: Lepidoptera
- Family: Geometridae
- Tribe: Boarmiini
- Genus: Glenoides; McDunnough, 1920

= Glenoides =

Genus of moths

Glenoides is a genus of moths in the family Geometridae described by James Halliday McDunnough in 1920.

== Species ==
- Glenoides lenticuligera Blanchard, 1973
- Glenoides texanaria (Hulst, 1888)
