= Graphidipus =

Scientific classification
- Kingdom: Animalia
- Phylum: Arthropoda
- Clade: Pancrustacea
- Class: Insecta
- Order: Lepidoptera
- Family: Geometridae
- Genus: Graphidipus

Genus of moths

Graphidipus is a genus of moths in the family Geometridae.

== List of species ==
- Graphidipus abraxaria
- Graphidipus alternans
- Graphidipus aureocapitaria
- Graphidipus clavistigma
- Graphidipus collaris
- Graphidipus flaviceps
- Graphidipus flavifilata
- Graphidipus flavirivulata
- Graphidipus fulvicostaria
- Graphidipus fumilinea
- Graphidipus gorrion
- Graphidipus graphidiparia
- Graphidipus longipedaria
- Graphidipus mediata
- Graphidipus pilifera
- Graphidipus pisciata
- Graphidipus poba
- Graphidipus puncticulata
- Graphidipus quadrisignata
- Graphidipus subcaesia
- Graphidipus subpisciata
