= Geoglada =

Scientific classification
- Kingdom: Animalia
- Phylum: Arthropoda
- Class: Insecta
- Order: Lepidoptera
- Family: Geometridae
- Genus: Geoglada

Genus of moths

Geoglada is a genus of moths in the family Geometridae. It is considered a synonym of Conolophia.
