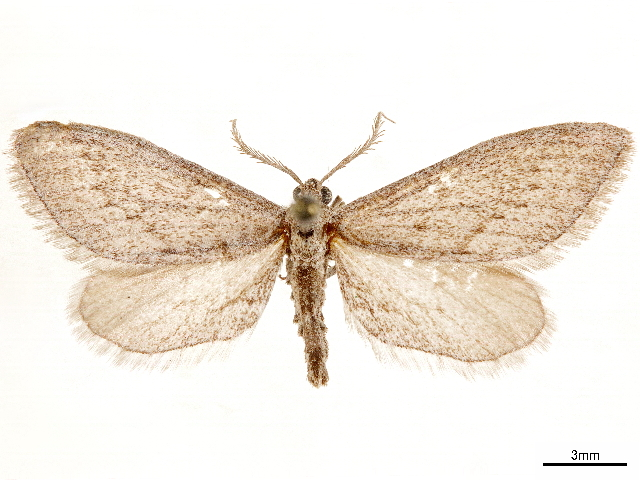
- Glaucina baea

Scientific classification
- Kingdom: Animalia
- Phylum: Arthropoda
- Class: Insecta
- Order: Lepidoptera
- Family: Geometridae
- Tribe: Boarmiini
- Genus: Glaucina; Hulst, 1896

Synonyms
- Coenocharis Hulst, 1896

= Glaucina =

Genus of moths

Glaucina is a genus of moths in the family Geometridae erected by George Duryea Hulst in 1896.

== Species ==
- Glaucina ampla Rindge, 1959
- Glaucina anomala Rindge, 1959
- Glaucina baea Rindge, 1959
- Glaucina biartata Rindge, 1959
- Glaucina bifida Rindge, 1959
- Glaucina cilla Rindge, 1959
- Glaucina denticularia (Dyar, 1907)
- Glaucina dispersa Rindge, 1959
- Glaucina elongata (Hulst, 1896)
- Glaucina epiphysaria Dyar, 1908
- Glaucina erroraria Dyar, 1907
- Glaucina escaria (Grote, 1882)
- Glaucina eupetheciaria (Grote, 1883)
- Glaucina eureka Grossbeck, 1912
- Glaucina golgolata (Strecker, 1899)
- Glaucina gonia Rindge, 1959
- Glaucina ignavaria (Pearsall, 1906)
- Glaucina imperdata (Dyar, 1915)
- Glaucina infumataria (Grote, 1877)
- Glaucina interruptaria (Grote, 1882)
- Glaucina lowensis (Cassino & Swett, 1925)
- Glaucina loxa Rindge, 1959
- Glaucina macdunnoughi (Grossbeck, 1912)
- Glaucina magnifica Grossbeck, 1912
- Glaucina mayelisaria Blanchard, 1966
- Glaucina nephos Rindge, 1959
- Glaucina nota Rindge, 1912
- Glaucina ochrofuscaria (Grote, 1882)
- Glaucina platia Rindge, 1959
- Glaucina spaldingata (Cassino & Swett, 1923)
- Glaucina utahensis (Cassino & Swett, 1924)
