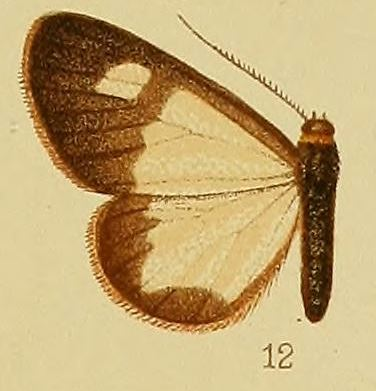
- Geodena conifera

Scientific classification
- Kingdom: Animalia
- Phylum: Arthropoda
- Class: Insecta
- Order: Lepidoptera
- Family: Geometridae
- Subfamily: Ennominae
- Genus: Geodena; Walker,1856

Synonyms
- Nothypsa Warren, 1909

= Geodena =

Genus of moths

Geodena is a genus of moth from the family Geometridae.
