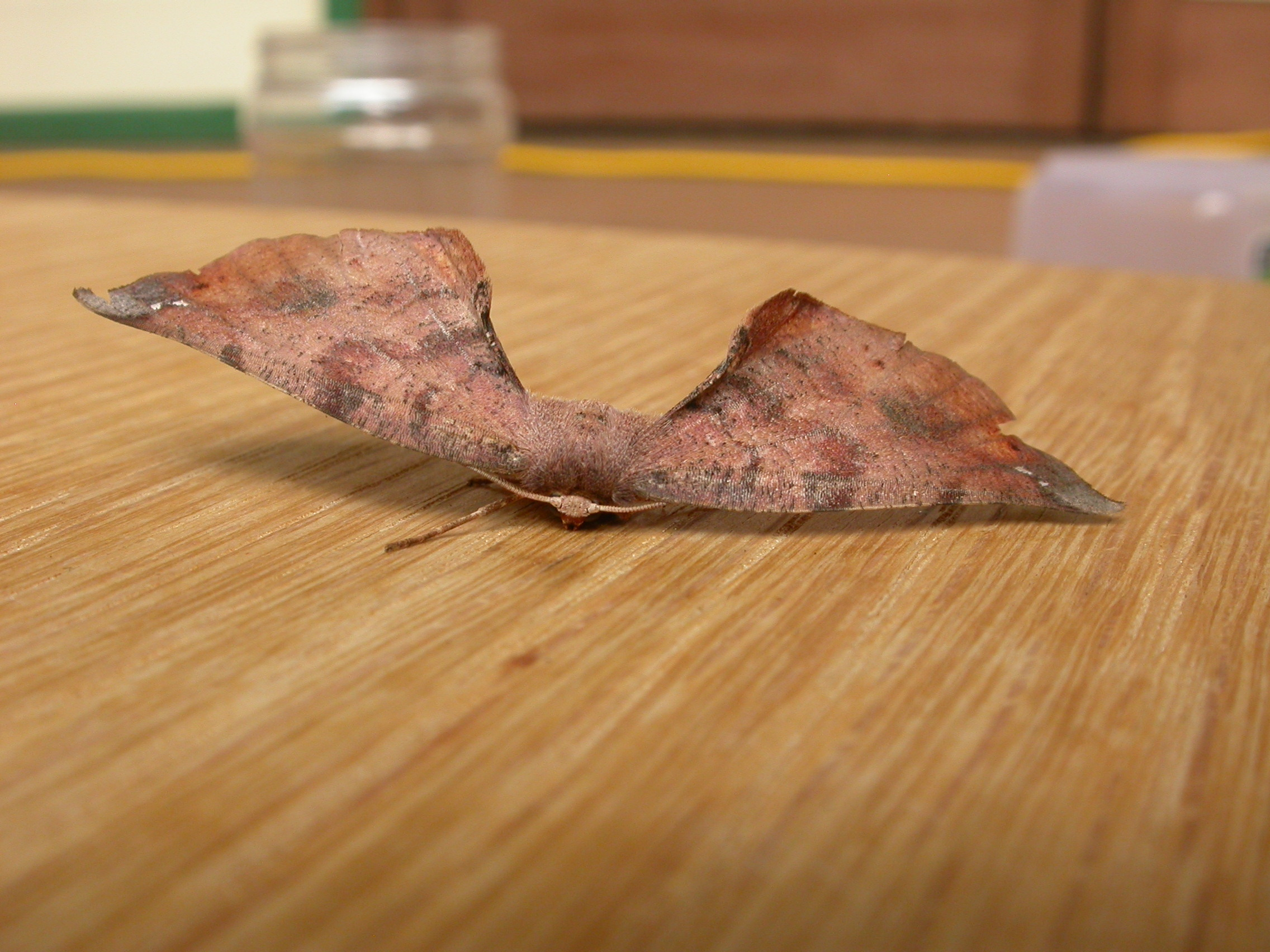
- Parepisparis virgatus

Scientific classification
- Domain: Eukaryota
- Kingdom: Animalia
- Phylum: Arthropoda
- Class: Insecta
- Order: Lepidoptera
- Family: Geometridae
- Subfamily: Oenochrominae
- Genus: Parepisparis; Bethune-Baker, 1906

Synonyms
- Gerusia Warren, 1907

= Parepisparis =

Genus of moths

Parepisparis is a genus of moths in the family Geometridae erected by George Thomas Bethune-Baker in 1906.

== Species ==
- Parepisparis brevidactyla Scoble & Edwards, 1990
- Parepisparis dumigani Scoble & Edwards, 1990
- Parepisparis excusata (Walker, 1860)
- Parepisparis lutosaria (R. Felder & Rogenhofer, 1875)
- Parepisparis multicolora (Lucas, 1892)
- Parepisparis pallidus Scoble & Edwards, 1990
- Parepisparis rutila (Turner, 1947)
- Parepisparis virgatus Scoble & Edwards, 1990
