= Bonatea =

Bonatea is the scientific name of two genera of organisms and may refer to

- Bonatea (moth), a genus of moths in the family Geometridae
- Bonatea (plant), a genus of plants in the family Orchidaceae
