= Obila =

Scientific classification
- Kingdom: Animalia
- Phylum: Arthropoda
- Class: Insecta
- Order: Lepidoptera
- Family: Geometridae
- Subfamily: Larentiinae
- Genus: Obila; Walker, 1869

Synonyms
- Brephoscotosia Warren, 1895; Calliscotus Butler, 1878

Genus of moths

Obila is a genus of moths in the family Geometridae erected by Francis Walker in 1869.
