= Lists of moths =

List of moth lists

This article is a list of lists of some of the 160,000 species of Lepidoptera that are commonly known as moths.

== By region ==
- Lists of Lepidoptera by region

== By taxonomy ==
- Taxonomy of the Lepidoptera
- List of Sphingidae species: (hawk moths) a family of moths known for rapid flight
- List of geometrid genera
- List of Pyralidae genera
- List of Tortricidae genera

== See also ==
- Category:Lists of moths by location
