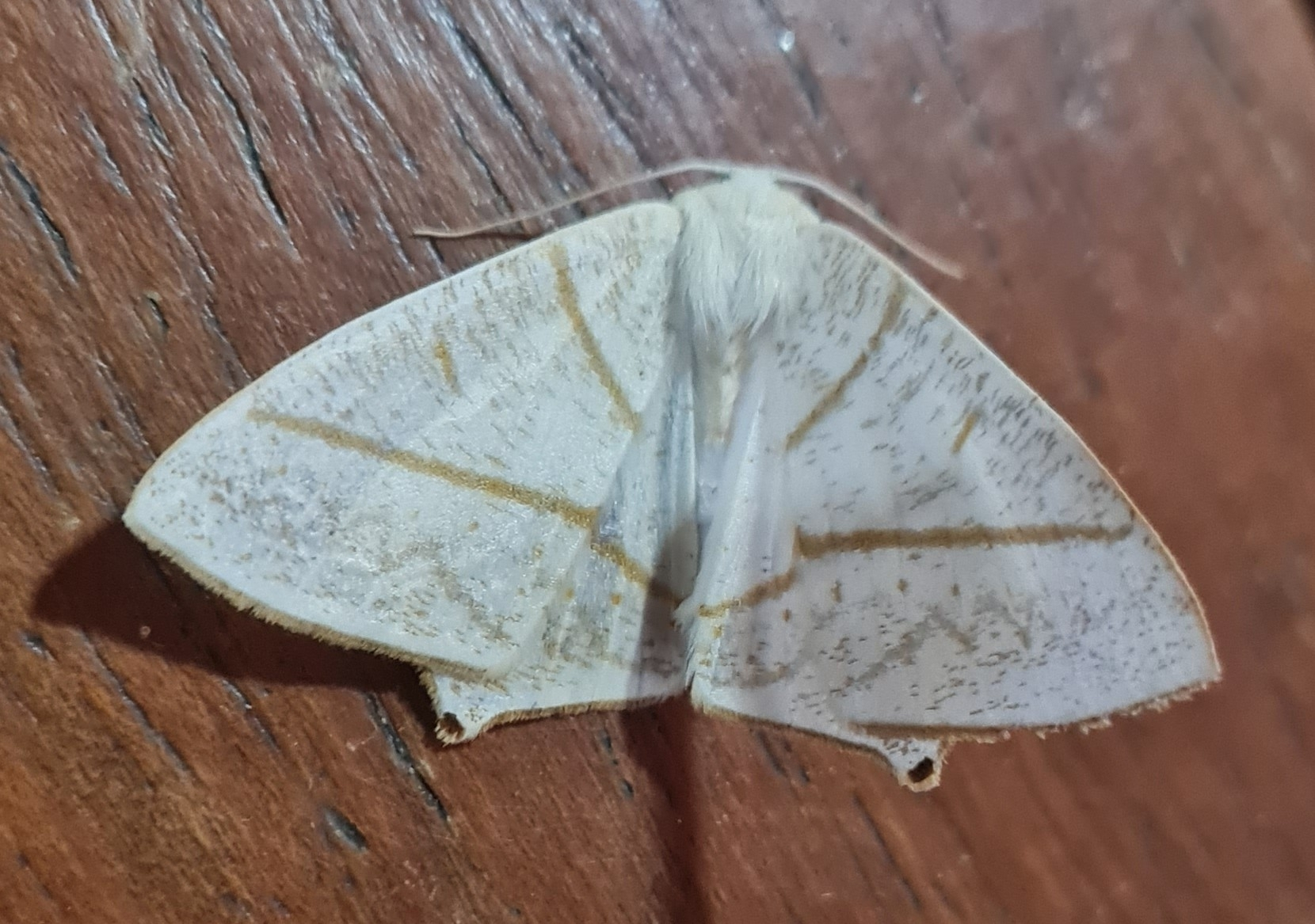

Scientific classification
- Kingdom: Animalia
- Phylum: Arthropoda
- Clade: Pancrustacea
- Class: Insecta
- Order: Lepidoptera
- Family: Geometridae
- Genus: Brachurapteryx
- Species: B. breviaria

Binomial name
- Brachurapteryx breviaria Hübner, 1825

= Brachurapteryx breviaria =

Species of moth

Brachurapteryx breviaria is a species of moth from the genus Brachurapteryx.
