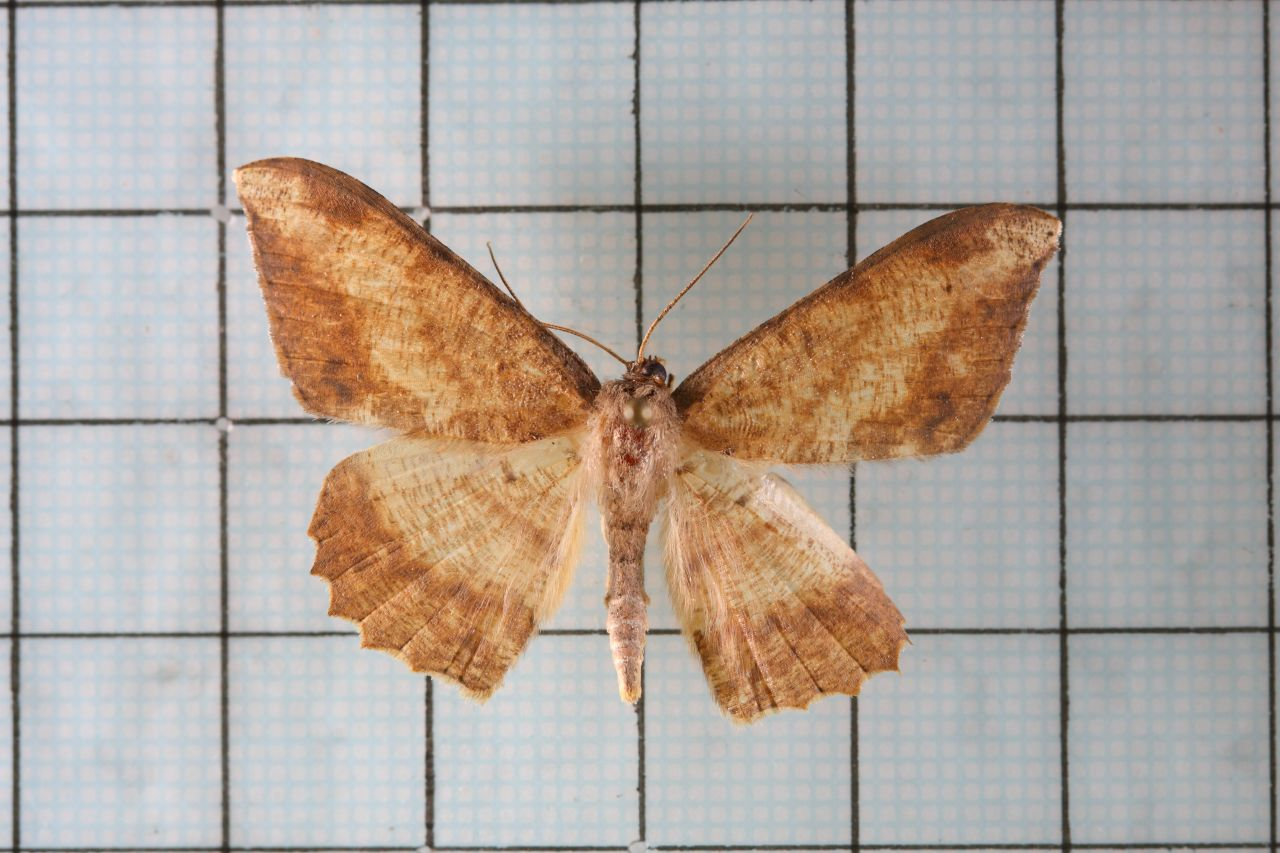

Scientific classification
- Domain: Eukaryota
- Kingdom: Animalia
- Phylum: Arthropoda
- Class: Insecta
- Order: Lepidoptera
- Family: Geometridae
- Genus: Luxiaria
- Species: L. amasa

Binomial name
- Luxiaria amasa (Butler, 1878)

Synonyms
- Bithia amasa Butler, 1878; Luxiaria fasciosa Moore, 1888; Luxiaria fulvifascia Warren, 1894

= Luxiaria amasa =

Species of moth

Luxiaria amasa is a moth in the family Geometridae first described by Arthur Gardiner Butler in 1878. It is found from south-eastern Siberia to Korea, Japan, northern India, Nepal, Taiwan, Borneo, Sumatra, Java and Sulawesi.

The wingspan is 40–45 mm.

== Subspecies ==
- Luxiaria amasa amasa
- Luxiaria amasa noda Prout, 1928 (Sulawesi)
- Luxiaria amasa perochrea Herbulot, 1993 (Sumatra)
