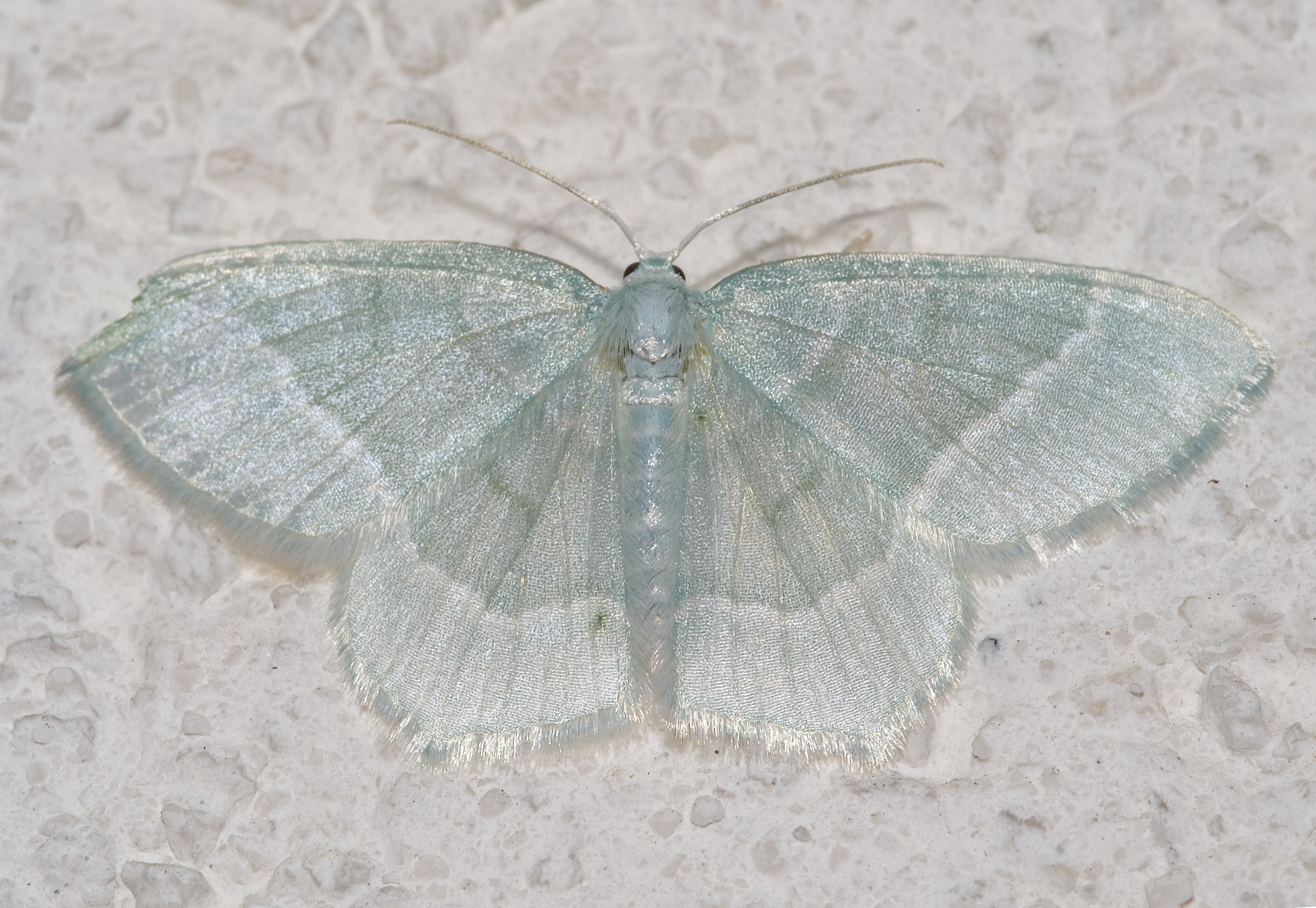

Scientific classification
- Kingdom: Animalia
- Phylum: Arthropoda
- Clade: Pancrustacea
- Class: Insecta
- Order: Lepidoptera
- Family: Geometridae
- Genus: Jodis
- Species: J. lactearia

Binomial name
- Jodis lactearia (Linnaeus, 1758)

= Jodis lactearia =

Species of moth

Jodis lactearia, the little emerald, is a moth of the family Geometridae. The species was first described by Carl Linnaeus in his 1758 10th edition of Systema Naturae. It is found throughout the Palearctic realm, from Ireland to Japan.

The wingspan is 23–26 mm. When freshly emerged from the pupa the ground colour is delicate light green, but this fades to white. There are two white medial lines on forewings and hindwings. The white postmedian line is on both wings almost entirely parallel to the distal margin, and not dentate. The hindwing is slightly angled. The larva is long and thin, green, the head is divided by a deep cleft into two pointed lobes.

The larva mainly feeds on various trees and bushes, including Betula, Crataegus and Quercus species.

It frequents wooded country, and flies rather early in the evening. Its flight is weak and vacillating, and never very long sustained.
