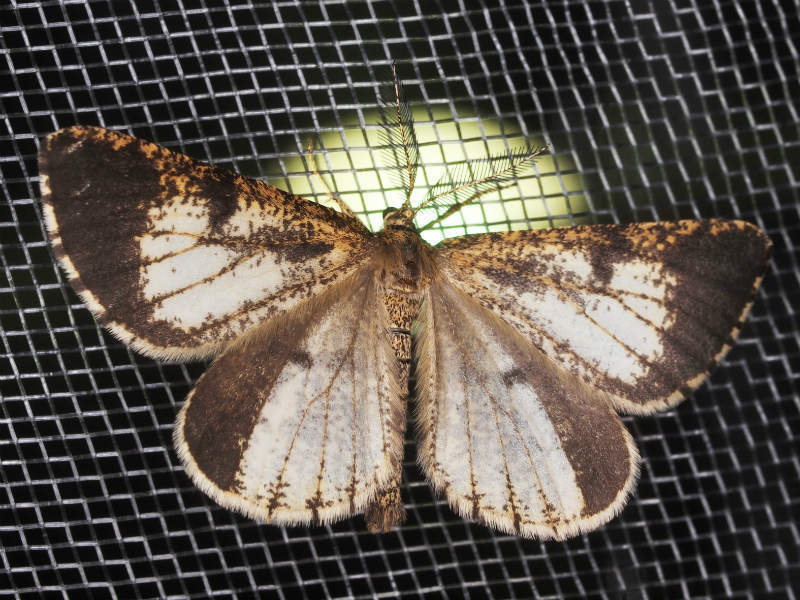

Scientific classification
- Kingdom: Animalia
- Phylum: Arthropoda
- Clade: Pancrustacea
- Class: Insecta
- Order: Lepidoptera
- Family: Geometridae
- Genus: Bupalus
- Species: B. vestalis

Binomial name
- Bupalus vestalis Staudinger, 1897

= Bupalus vestalis =

Species of moth

Bupalus vestalis, is a moth of the family Geometridae, found in China, Japan, Russia and South Korea.
