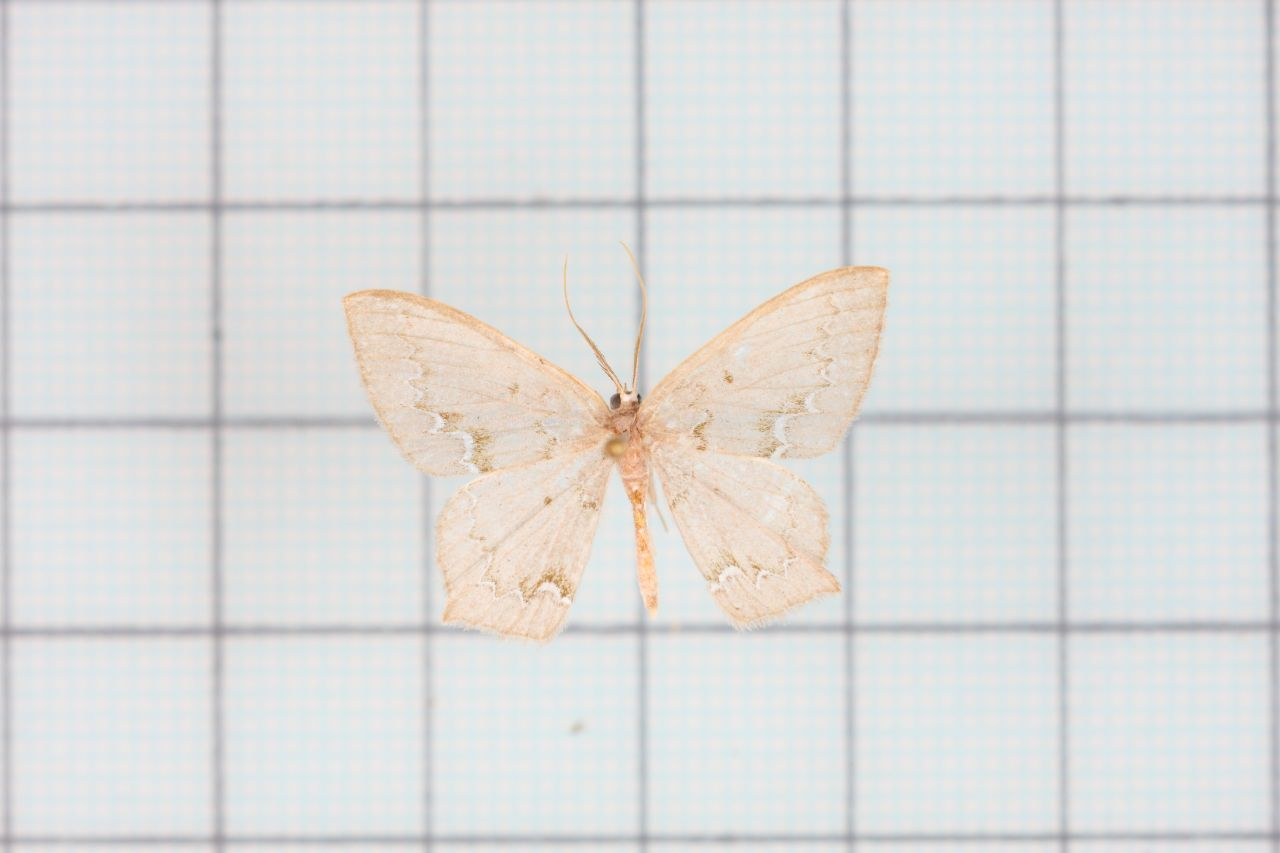

Scientific classification
- Kingdom: Animalia
- Phylum: Arthropoda
- Class: Insecta
- Order: Lepidoptera
- Family: Geometridae
- Genus: Jodis
- Species: J. inumbrata

Binomial name
- Jodis inumbrata Warren, 1896

Synonyms
- Jodis unumbrata

= Jodis inumbrata =

Species of moth

Jodis inumbrata is a species of moth of the family Geometridae. It is found in Bhutan and Taiwan.
