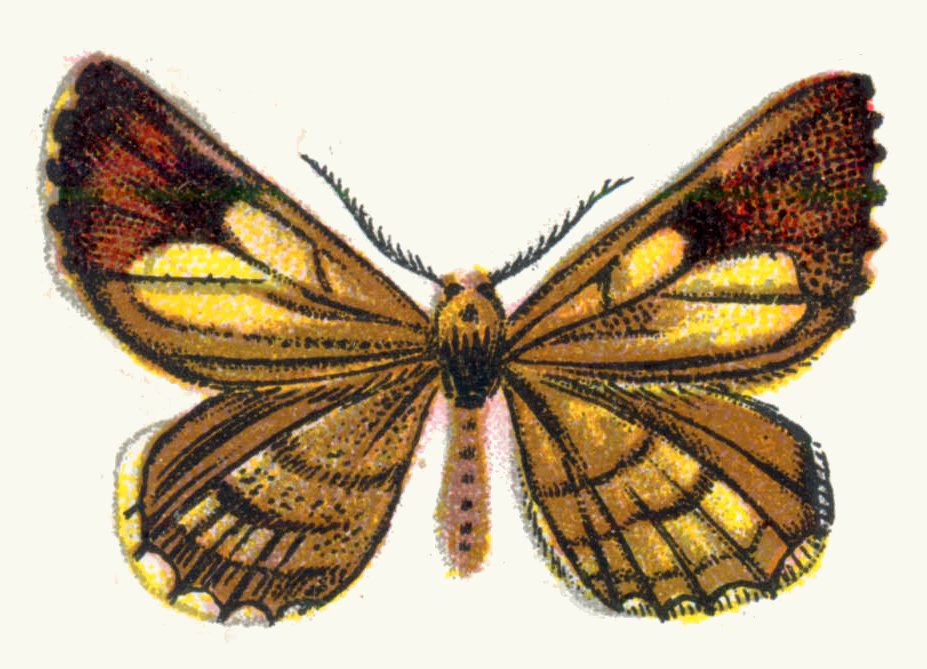
- Upperwings of adult male of a southern population

Scientific classification
- Kingdom: Animalia
- Phylum: Arthropoda
- Clade: Pancrustacea
- Class: Insecta
- Order: Lepidoptera
- Family: Geometridae
- Genus: Bupalus
- Species: B. piniaria

Binomial name
- Bupalus piniaria (Linnaeus, 1758)

Synonyms
- List: Bupalus piniarius (lapsus); Phalaena piniaria Linnaeus, 1758

= Bordered white =

Species of moth

The bordered white or pine looper (Bupalus piniaria), is a moth of the family Geometridae. Among these, it belongs to tribe Bupalini of the subfamily Ennominae. B. piniaria is a common species throughout the western Palearctic region, the Near East and North Africa. However, its presence in certain regions – e.g. the northern Balkans – is doubtful. East it is found to Siberia and Amur Oblast.

Three subspecies are generally recognized, while two additional ones are doubtfully distinct:

- Bupalus piniaria bernieri de Lajonquiere, 1958
- Bupalus piniaria espagnolus Eitschberger & Steiniger, 1975
- Bupalus piniaria flavescens White, 1876 (usually included in piniaria)
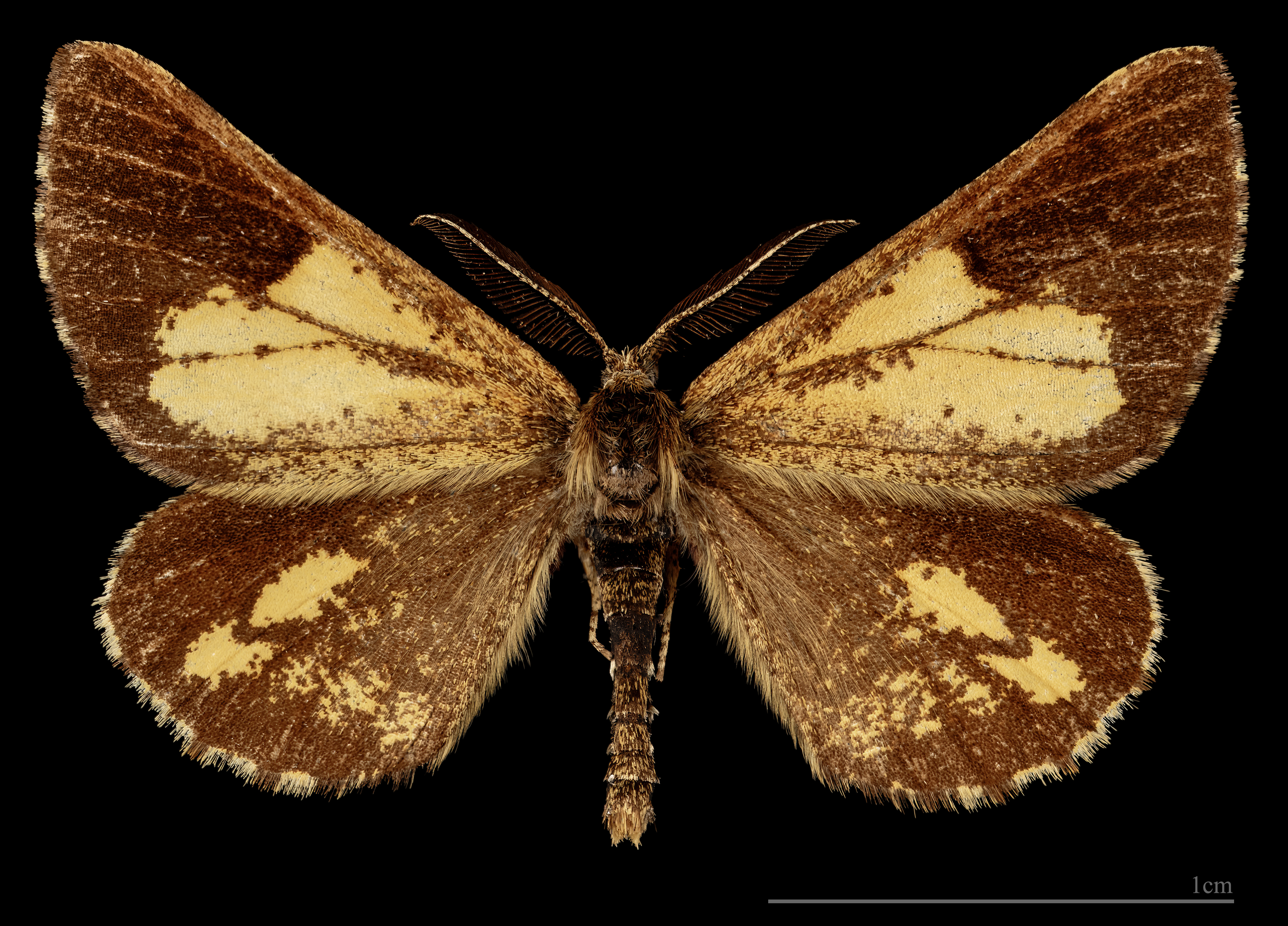
MHNT Bupalus piniaria flavescens ♂

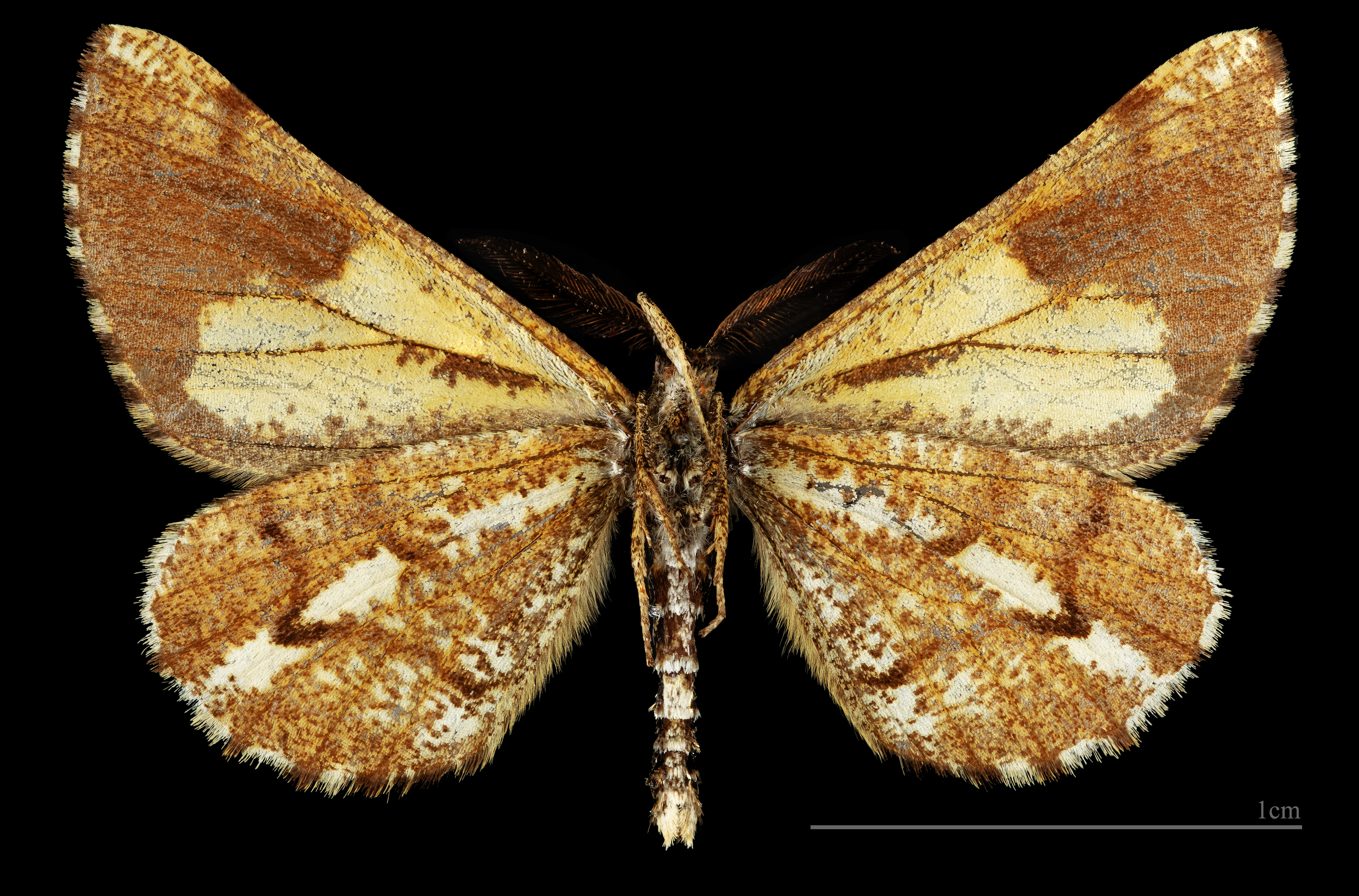
MHNT Bupalus piniaria flavescens ♂ △
- Bupalus piniaria mughusaria Gumppenberg, 1887 (usually included in piniaria)
- Bupalus piniaria piniaria (Linnaeus, 1758)

In addition, many forms (e.g. kolleri) have also been named.

== Description and ecology ==
This moth is an inhabitant of coniferous woodland. The adults fly in May and June, sometimes later (up to August or so) in the north of the range. Their wingspan is 34–40 mm. This is a variable species with strong sexual dimorphism, always conspicuous in the antennae which are combed in the males and plain in the females. Females, particularly when filled with ripe eggs, also have a plumper abdomen.

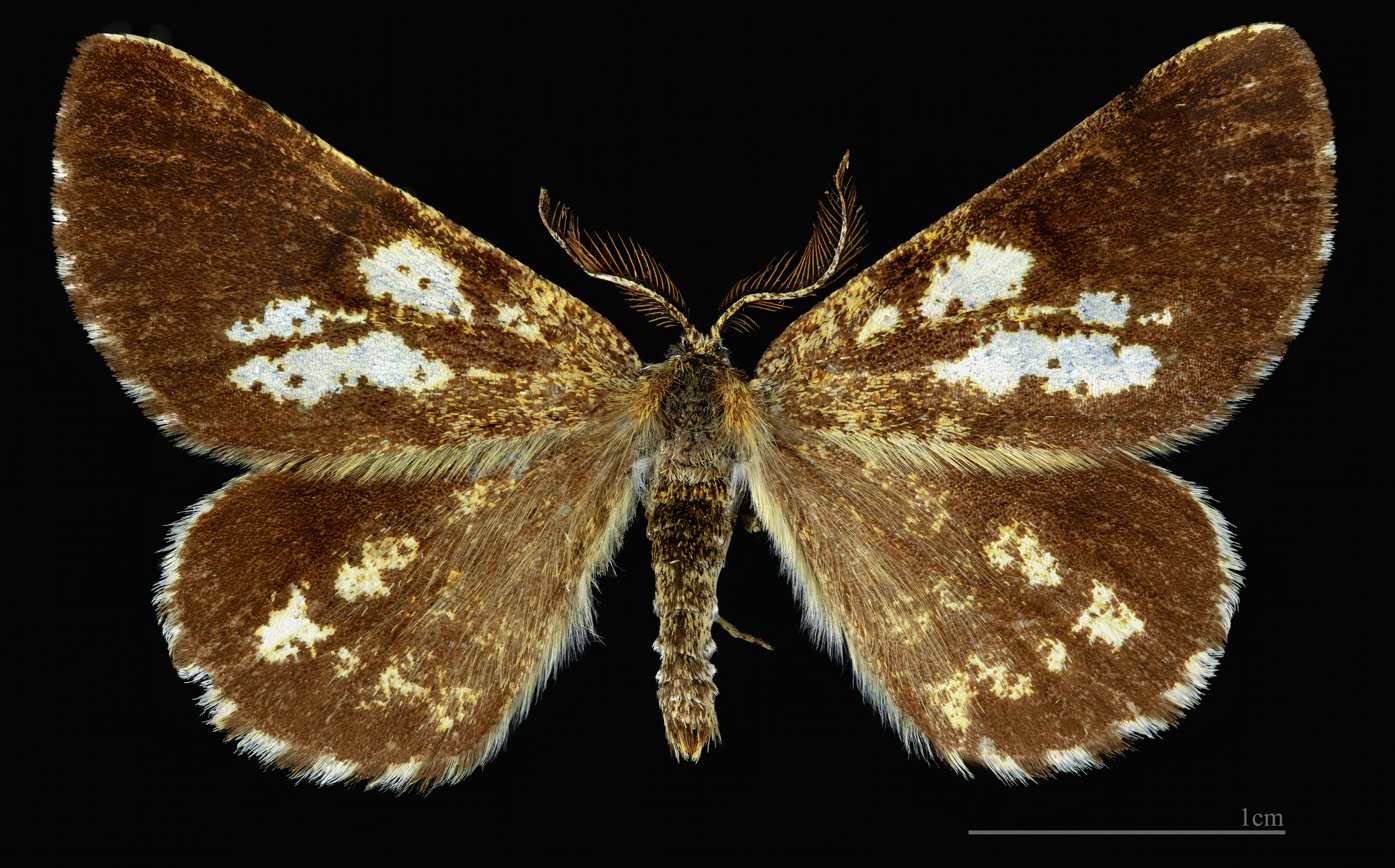
Bupalus piniaria ♂

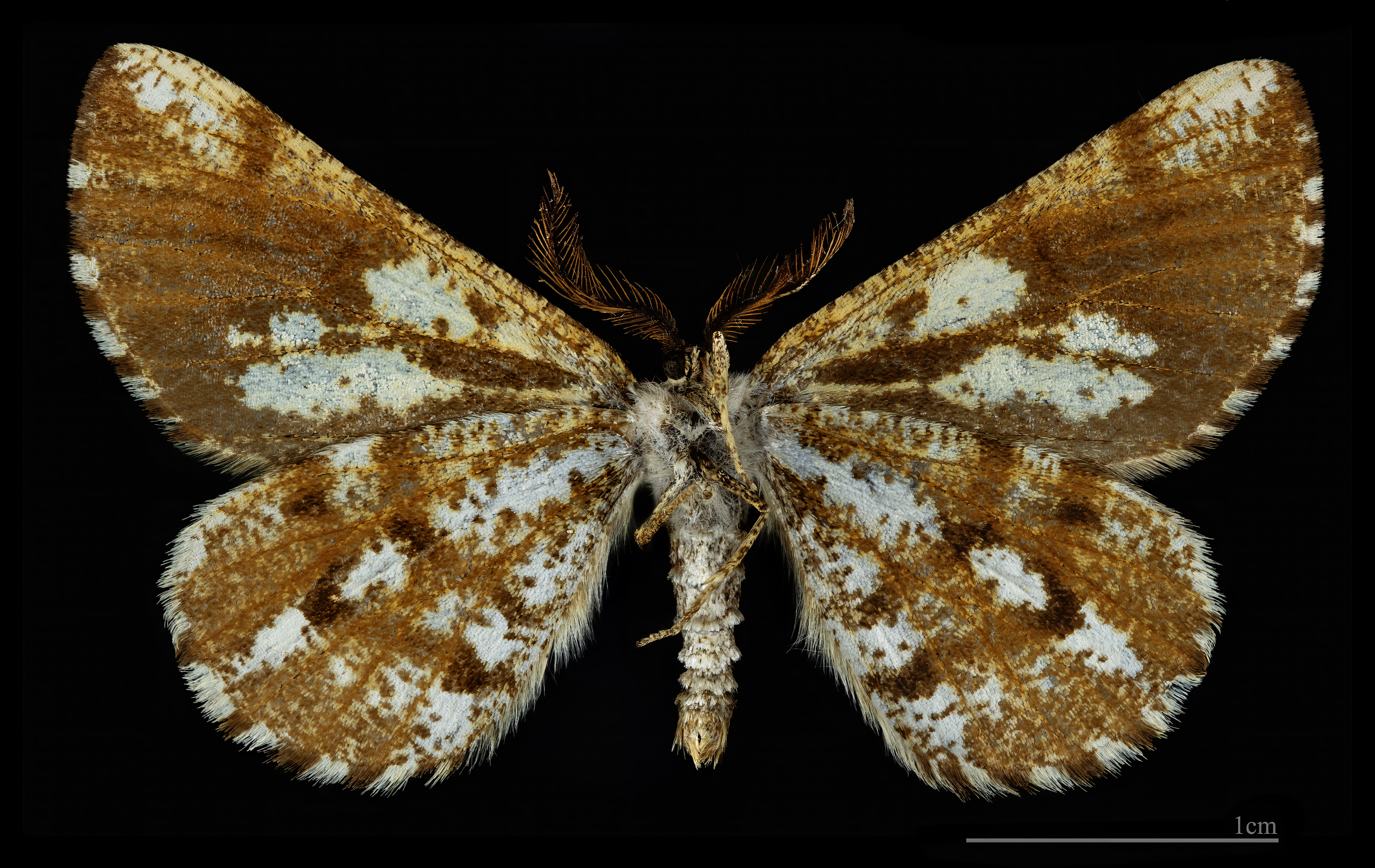
♂ △

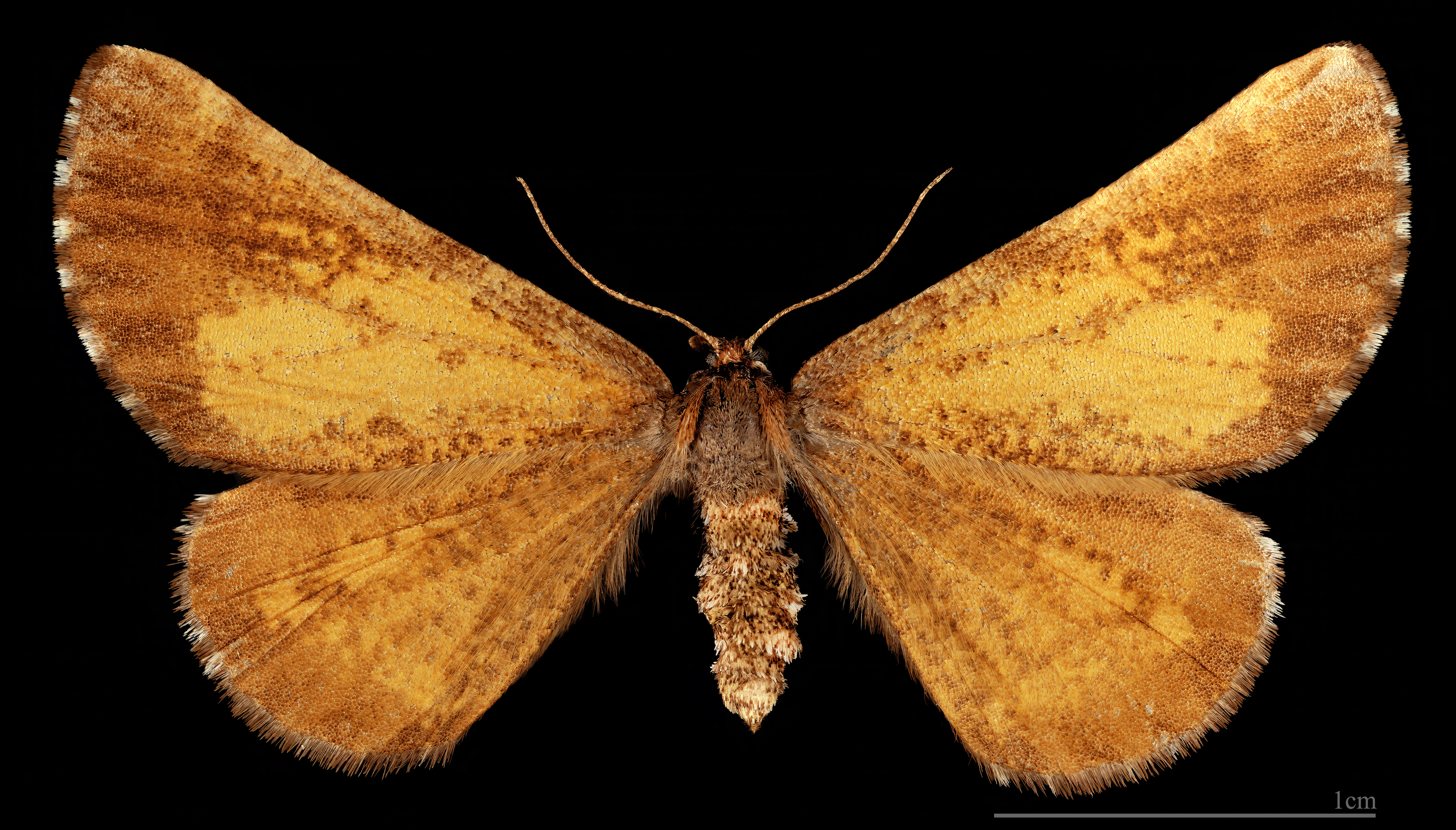
Bupalus piniaria♀

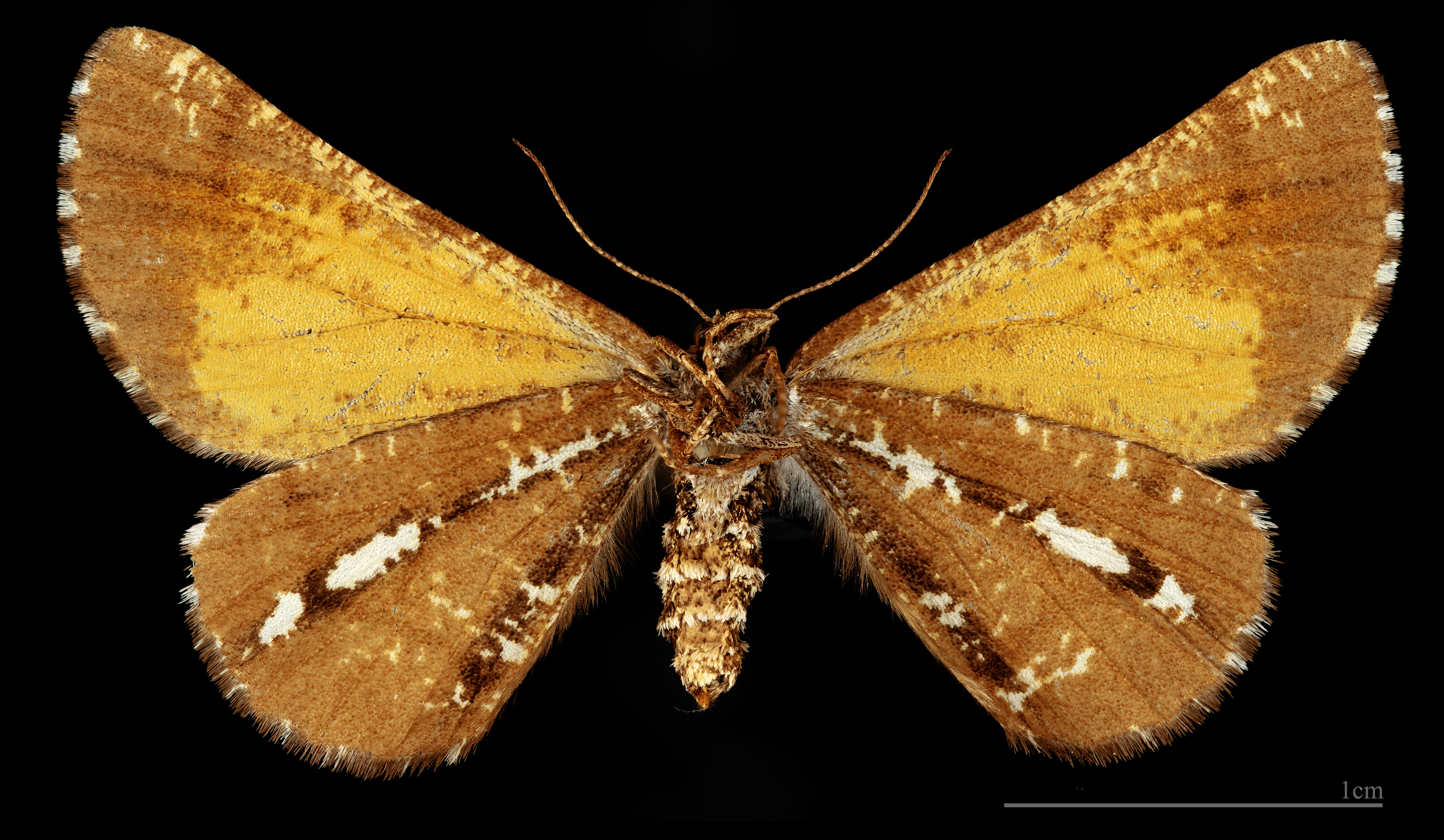
♀ △

The male has upperwings with broad dark brown borders and spots and a background varying from white in the north to deep yellow in southern populations. The female is plainer, varying from yellow to brown on the upperwings, which have slightly darker crosswise stripes. In both sexes, the wingtips are darkest. The underwings are less dimorphic, orange-brown with darker tips on the forewings and marbled light brown with a whitish lengthwise stripe on the hindwings in both sexes. The male's underwings have a wider whitish hindwing stripe and darker forewing tips, while the females have a more contrasting hindwing pattern. All four wings are bordered by a short fringe of alternating sections of white and dark brown hairs. Bilateral gynandromorphs are easily recognized in this species.

The caterpillar (also known as a larva) can be a serious pest in conifer plantations. They are green with pale lines and usually feed on various species of pine (Pinus), especially Scots pine (P. sylvestris) and European black pine (P. nigra). It has also been recorded feeding on Douglas-fir (Pseudotsuga menziesii), larch (Larix) and spruce (Picea, e.g. Norway spruce P. abies). Larvae have four to six instars and pupate in the soil where they overwinter.

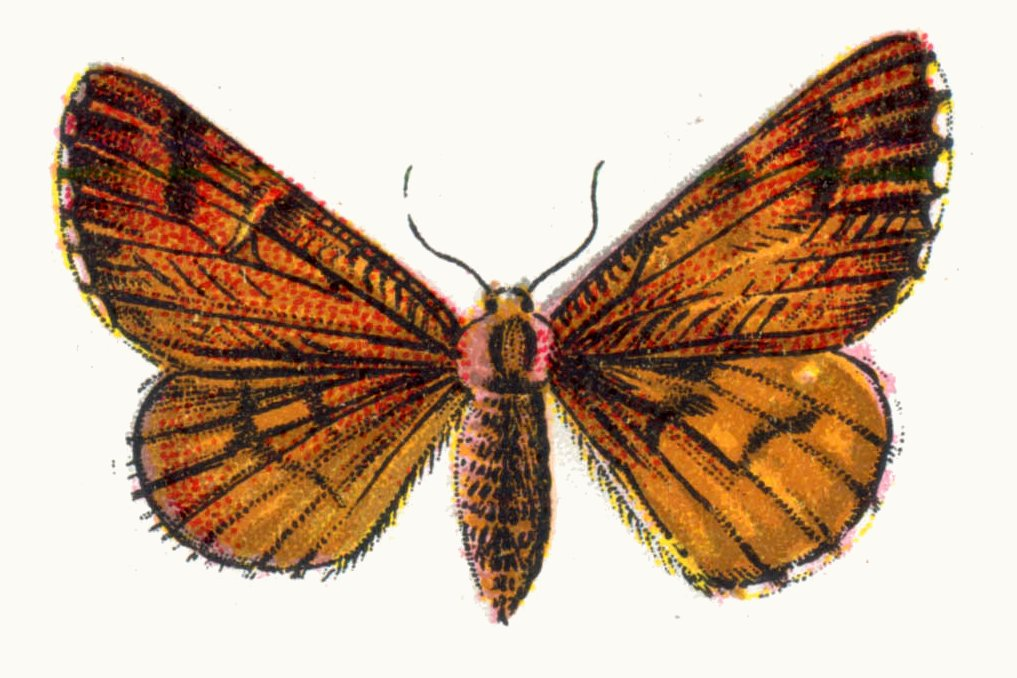
Upperwings of southern adult female

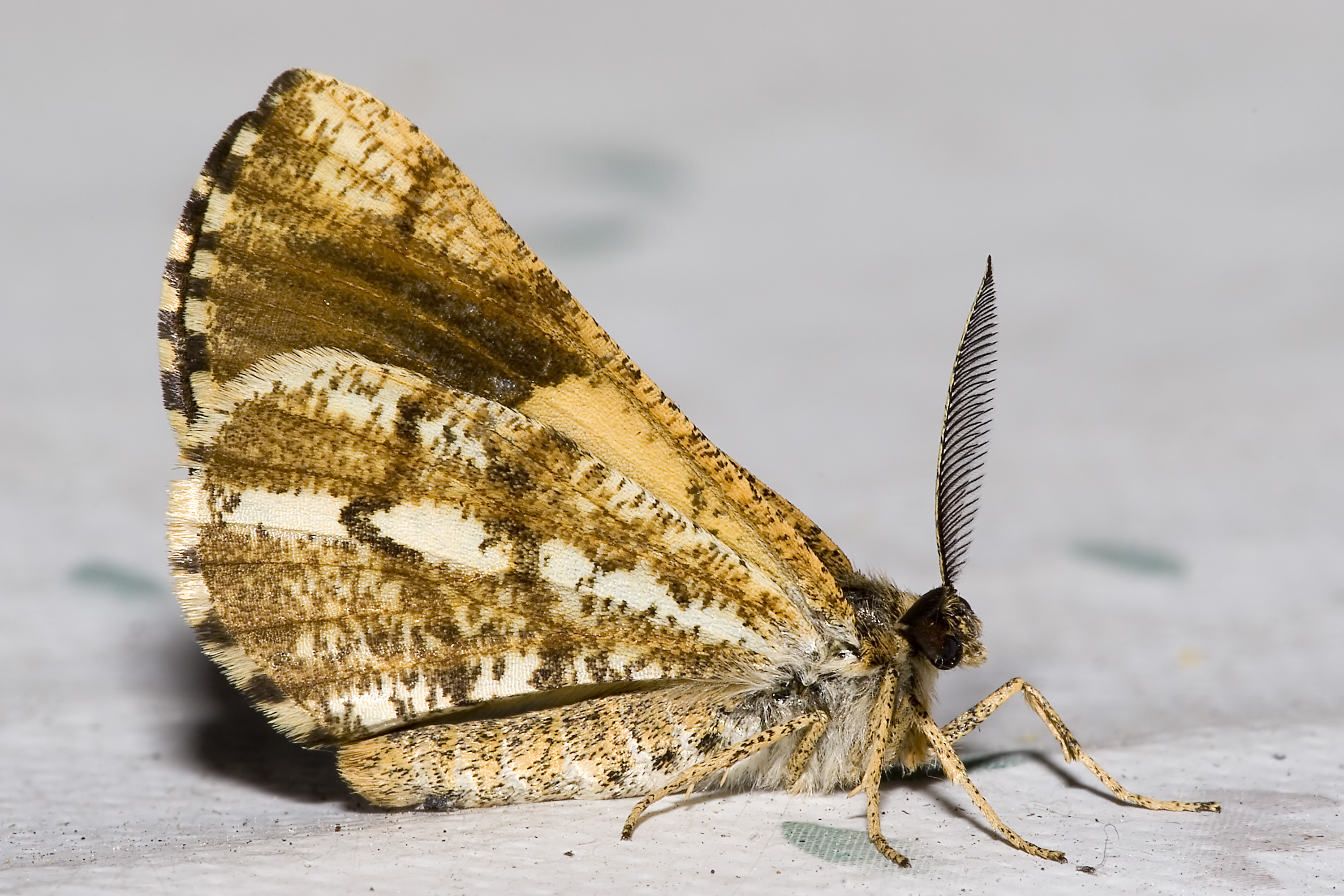
Underwings of adult male from Dresden (Germany)

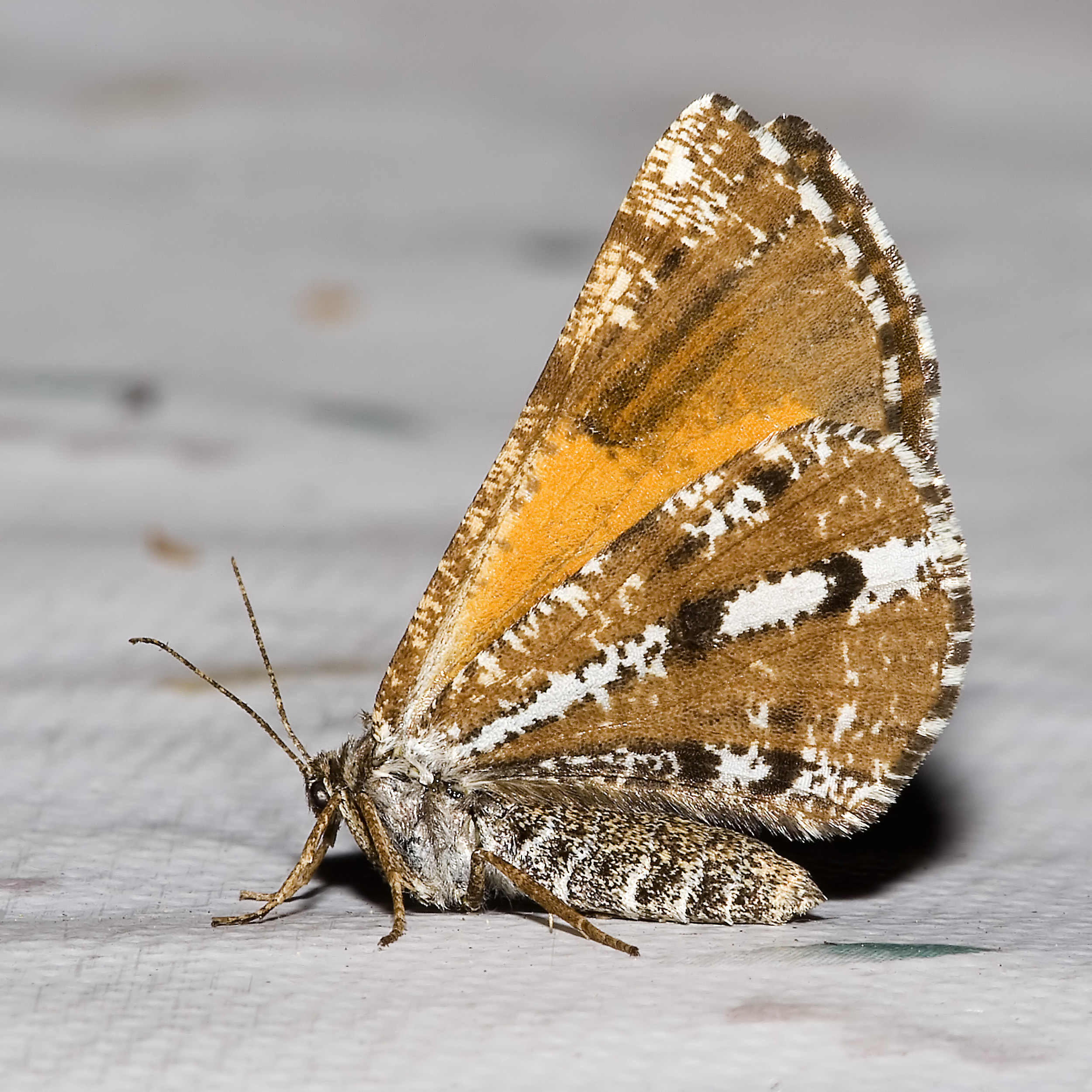
Underwings of adult female from Dresden (Germany)

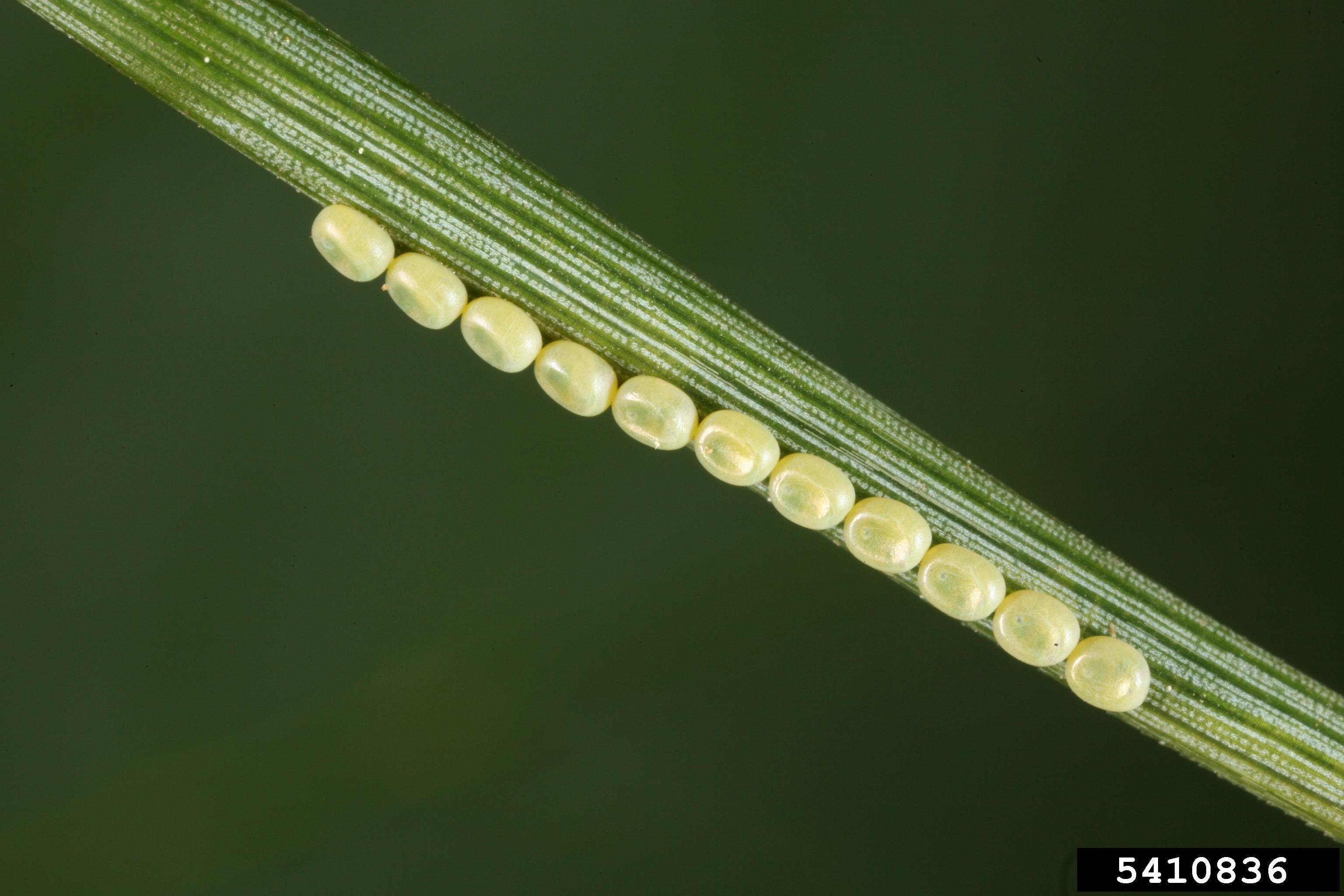
Eggs

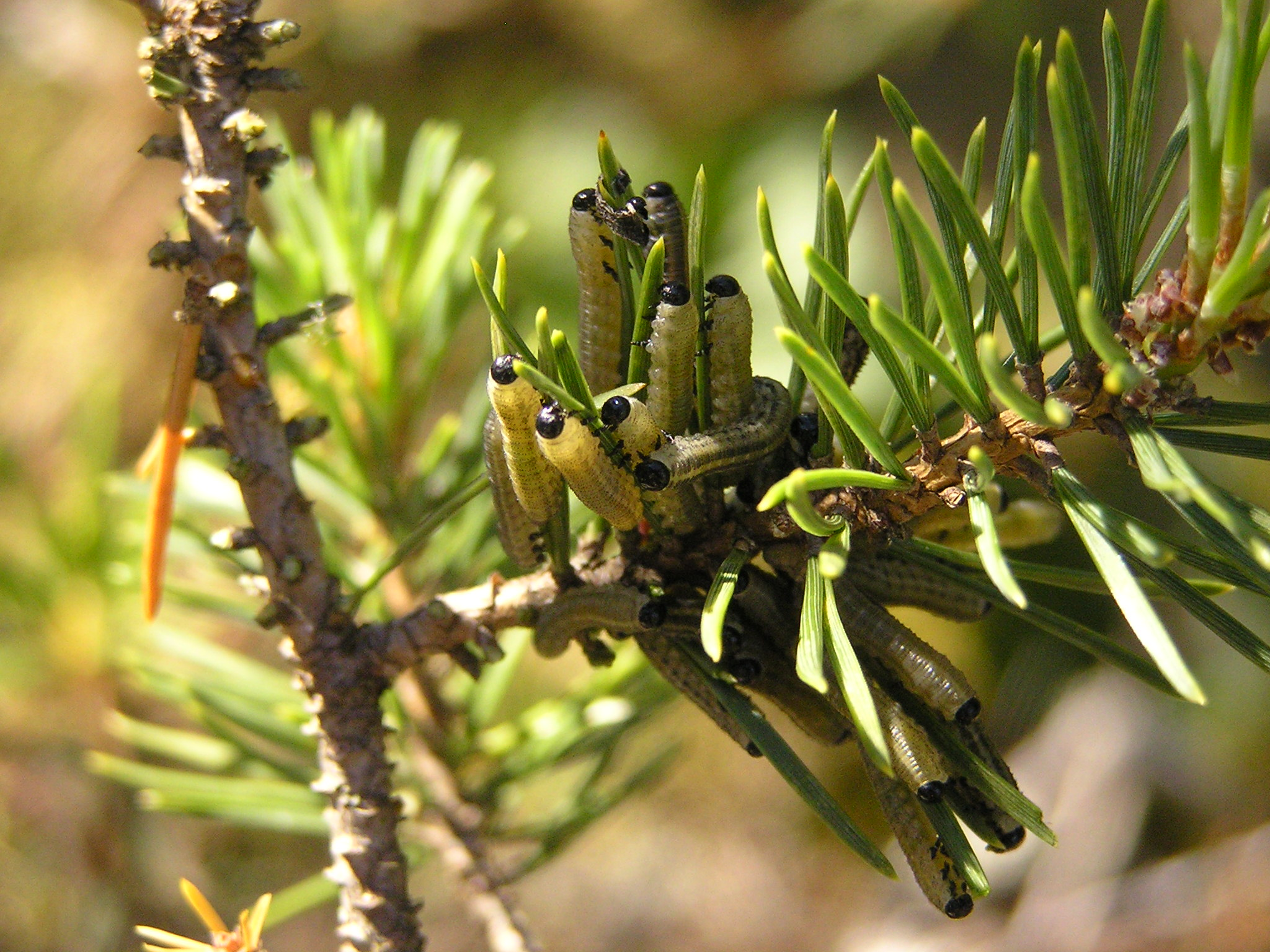
Early instar larvae

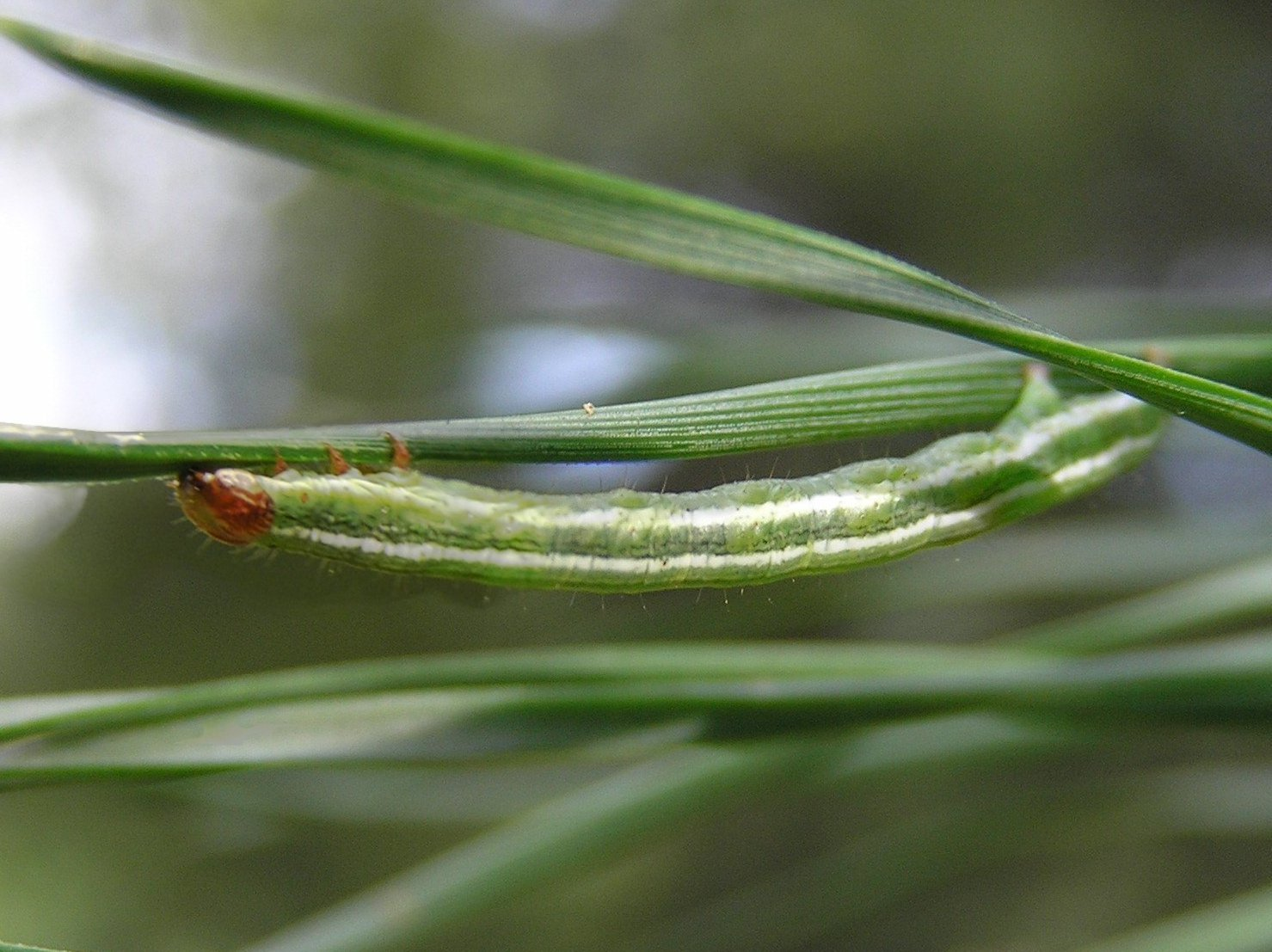
Caterpillar

== Taxonomy ==
It is (under its original scientific name Phalaena piniaria) the type species of its genus Bupalus, as well as the junior objective synonyms Catograpta, Chleuastes and Phaophyga, and the preoccupied Bupala. Via its genus, it is also the type of the Bupalini. Bupalus was raised by the English zoologist William Elford Leach, in 1815 and is the name of a 6th-century BC Greek sculptor. The specific name piniaria refers to Pinus the pine tree genus and food-plant.
