= Bylazora infumata =

Scientific classification
- Kingdom: Animalia
- Phylum: Arthropoda
- Clade: Pancrustacea
- Class: Insecta
- Order: Lepidoptera
- Family: Geometridae
- Genus: Bylazora
- Species: B. infumata

Binomial name
- Bylazora infumata Felder, 1874

Species of moth

Bylazora infumata is a moth in the family of Geometridae.
