= Pterocypha defensata =

Scientific classification
- Kingdom: Animalia
- Phylum: Arthropoda
- Class: Insecta
- Order: Lepidoptera
- Family: Geometridae
- Tribe: Hydriomenini
- Genus: Pterocypha
- Species: P. defensata

Binomial name
- Pterocypha defensata Walker, 1862

Synonyms
- Pterocypha floridata (Walker, 1863)

Species of insect (geometrid moth)

Pterocypha defensata is a species of geometrid moth in the family Geometridae. It is found in the Caribbean Sea and North America.

The MONA or Hodges number for Pterocypha defensata is 7299.
