= Luxiaria phyllosaria =

Scientific classification
- Kingdom: Animalia
- Phylum: Arthropoda
- Clade: Pancrustacea
- Class: Insecta
- Order: Lepidoptera
- Family: Geometridae
- Genus: Luxiaria
- Species: L. phyllosaria

Binomial name
- Luxiaria phyllosaria (Walker, 1860)

Synonyms
- Drepanodes? phyllosaria Walker, 1860; Luxiaria alfenusaria Walker, 1860; Luxiaria phyllosaria Walker; Holloway, 1976

Species of moth

Luxiaria phyllosaria is a moth of the family Geometridae first described by Francis Walker in 1860. It is found in Sri Lanka, the north-eastern Himalayas of India, Sumatra, Borneo, the Philippines and Sulawesi.

Dark brown fringes are found in the margins of both wings. A dark brown bar with grey.
