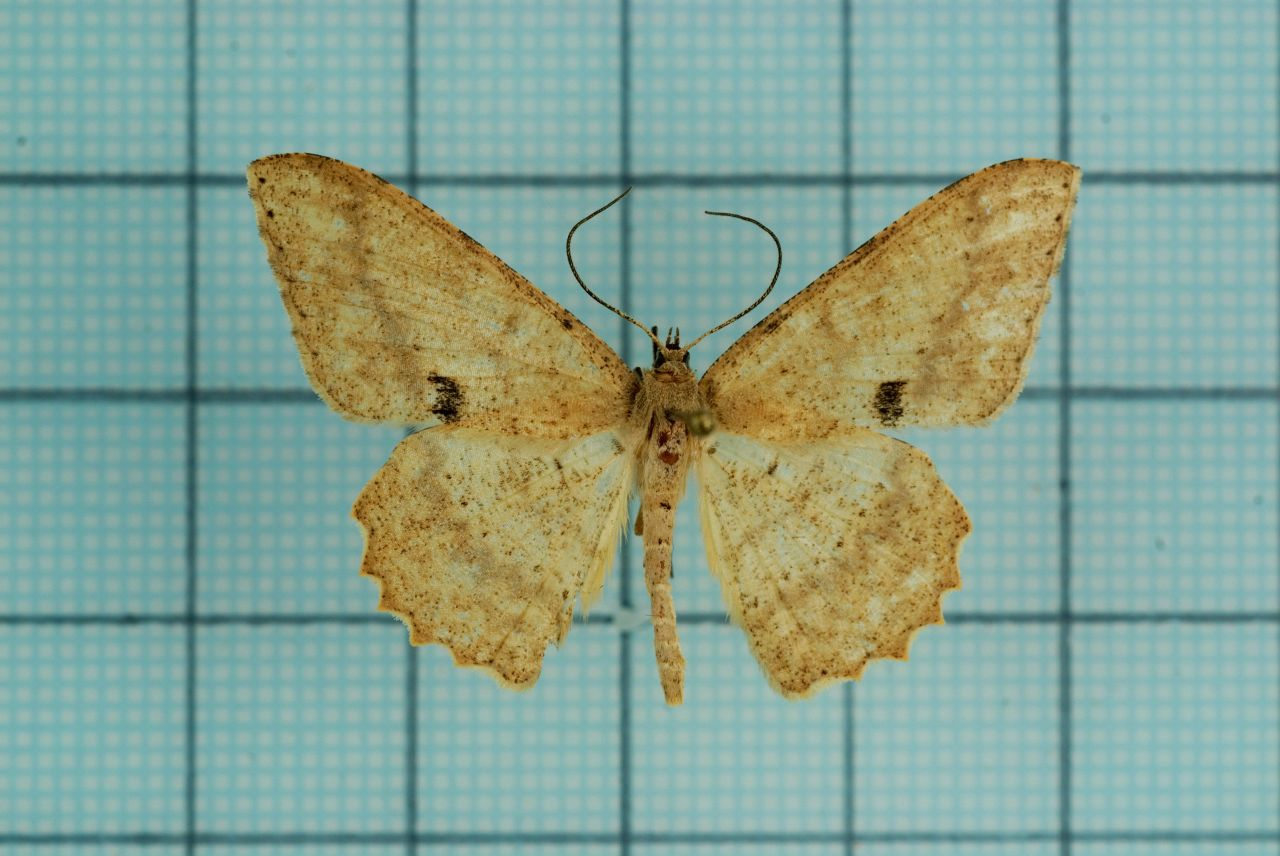
- Mounted
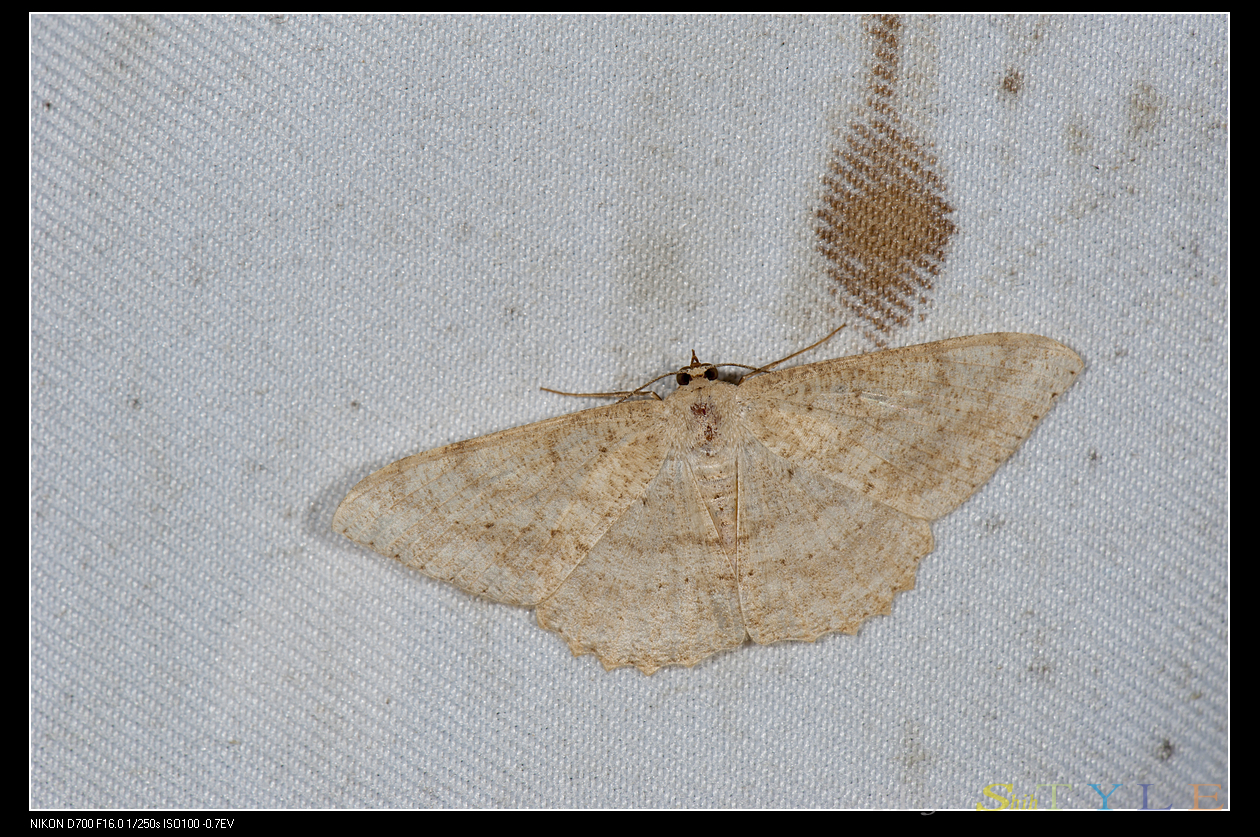
- Living

Scientific classification
- Kingdom: Animalia
- Phylum: Arthropoda
- Clade: Pancrustacea
- Class: Insecta
- Order: Lepidoptera
- Family: Geometridae
- Genus: Luxiaria
- Species: L. mitorrhaphes

Binomial name
- Luxiaria mitorrhaphes Prout, 1925

= Luxiaria mitorrhaphes =

Species of moth

Luxiaria mitorrhaphes is a moth in the family Geometridae first described by Louis Beethoven Prout in 1925. It is found from the Himalayas to Japan, Taiwan, Myanmar, Borneo and Java.
