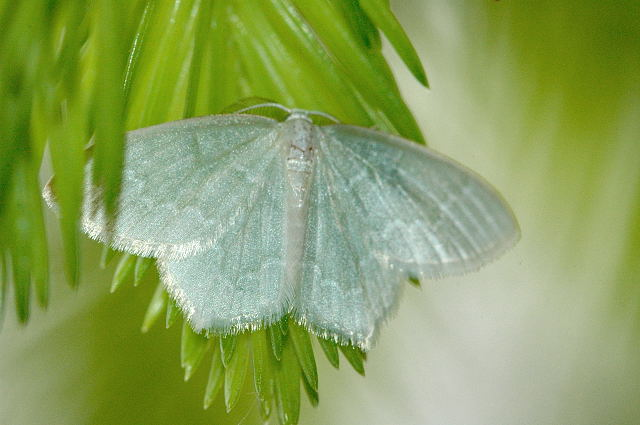

Scientific classification
- Kingdom: Animalia
- Phylum: Arthropoda
- Class: Insecta
- Order: Lepidoptera
- Family: Geometridae
- Genus: Jodis
- Species: J. putata

Binomial name
- Jodis putata (Linnaeus, 1758)

= Jodis putata =

Species of moth

Jodis putata is a moth of the family Geometridae. It is found in parts of Europe.

The length of the forewings is 10–12 mm. The adults fly from late April to mid July in one generation.

1. The flight season refers to the Netherlands and Belgium. This may vary in other parts of the range.
