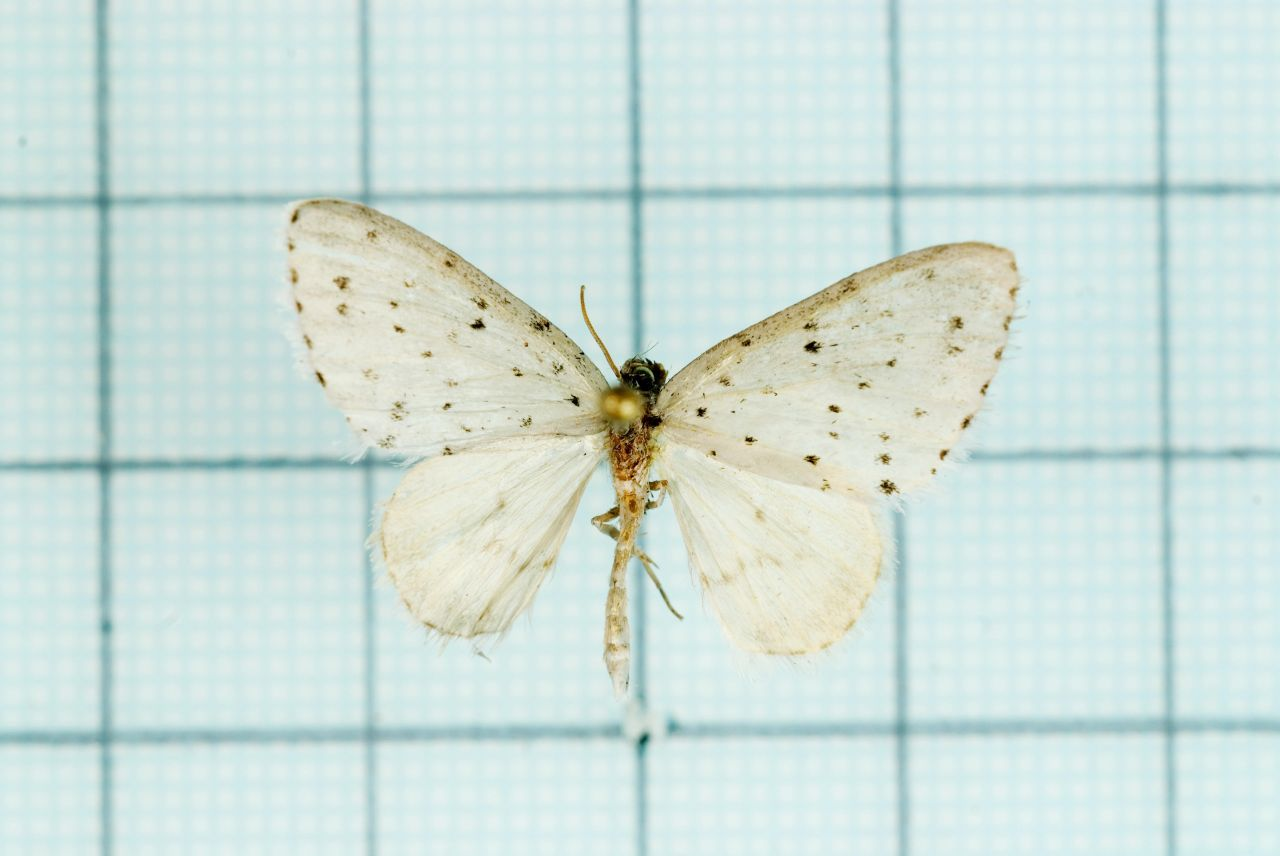

Scientific classification
- Domain: Eukaryota
- Kingdom: Animalia
- Phylum: Arthropoda
- Class: Insecta
- Order: Lepidoptera
- Family: Geometridae
- Genus: Naxidia
- Species: N. punctata

Binomial name
- Naxidia punctata (Butler, 1880)

Synonyms
- Argidava punctata Butler, 1880

= Naxidia punctata =

Species of moth

Naxidia punctata is a moth in the family Geometridae. It is found in India and Taiwan.

The wingspan is 30–31 mm. Adults are dirty white.
