= Jubarella =

Scientific classification
- Kingdom: Animalia
- Phylum: Arthropoda
- Clade: Pancrustacea
- Class: Insecta
- Order: Lepidoptera
- Family: Geometridae
- Genus: Jubarella; Hulst, 1898

Type species
- Jubarella danbyi Hulst, 1898

Genus of moths

Jubarella is a genus of moths in the family Geometridae erected by George Duryea Hulst in 1898.
