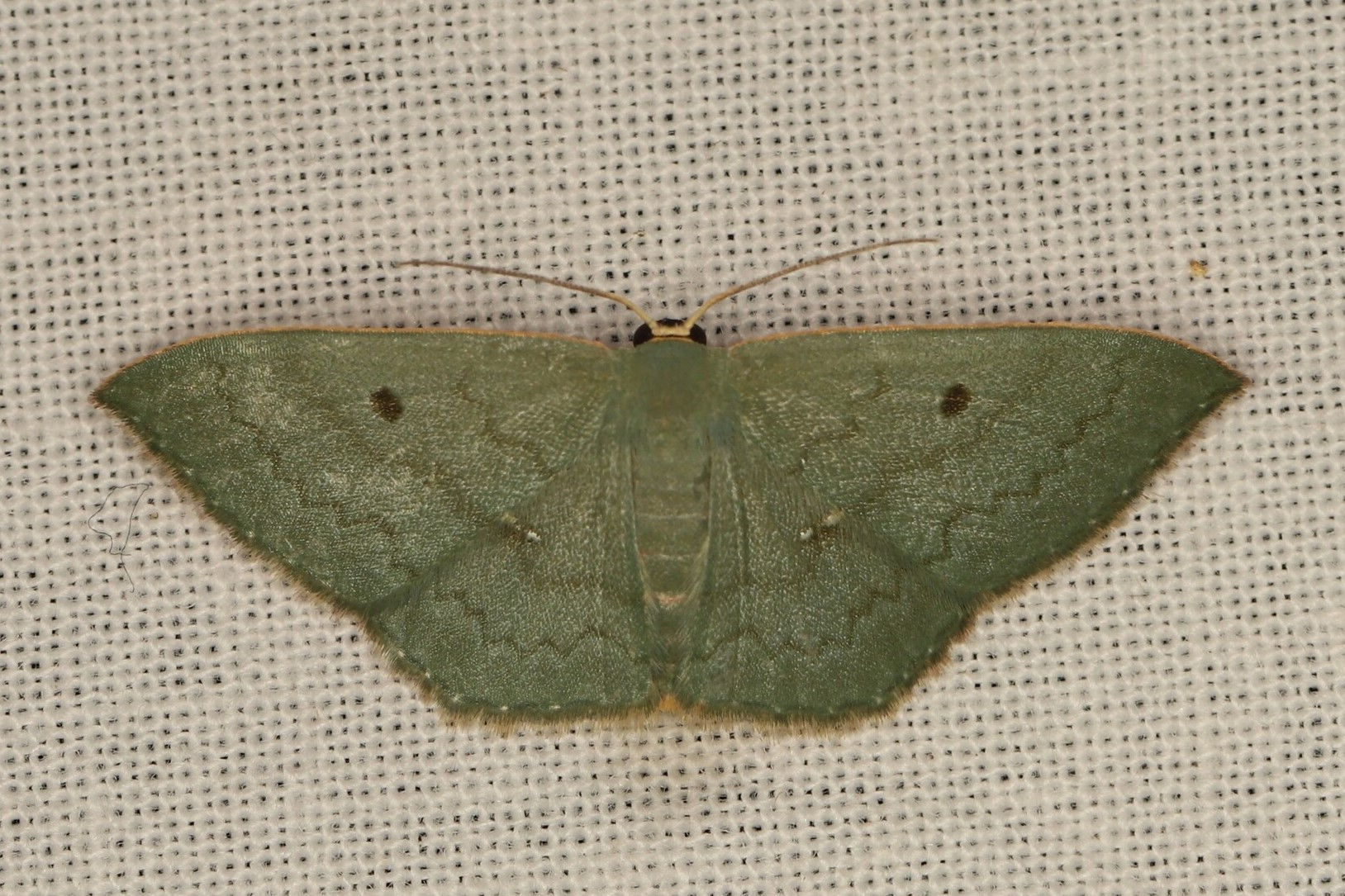

Scientific classification
- Kingdom: Animalia
- Phylum: Arthropoda
- Class: Insecta
- Order: Lepidoptera
- Family: Geometridae
- Genus: Zalissolepis; Warren, 1895
- Species: Z. subviolaria

Binomial name
- Zalissolepis subviolaria (Guenée, 1857)

Synonyms
- Amaurinia subviolaria Guenée, 1857

= Zalissolepis =

Zalissolepis subviolaria

Genus of moths

Zalissolepis is a monotypic moth genus in the family Geometridae described by Warren in 1895. Its only species, Zalissolepis subviolaria, was first described by Achille Guenée in 1857. It is found in French Guiana.
