= Yermoia =

Scientific classification
- Kingdom: Animalia
- Phylum: Arthropoda
- Class: Insecta
- Order: Lepidoptera
- Family: Geometridae
- Genus: Yermoia; McDunnough, 1940

Genus of moths

Yermoia is a genus of moths in the family Geometridae erected by James Halliday McDunnough in 1940.

== Species ==
- Yermoia perplexata McDunnough, 1940
- Yermoia glaucina Rindge, 1961
