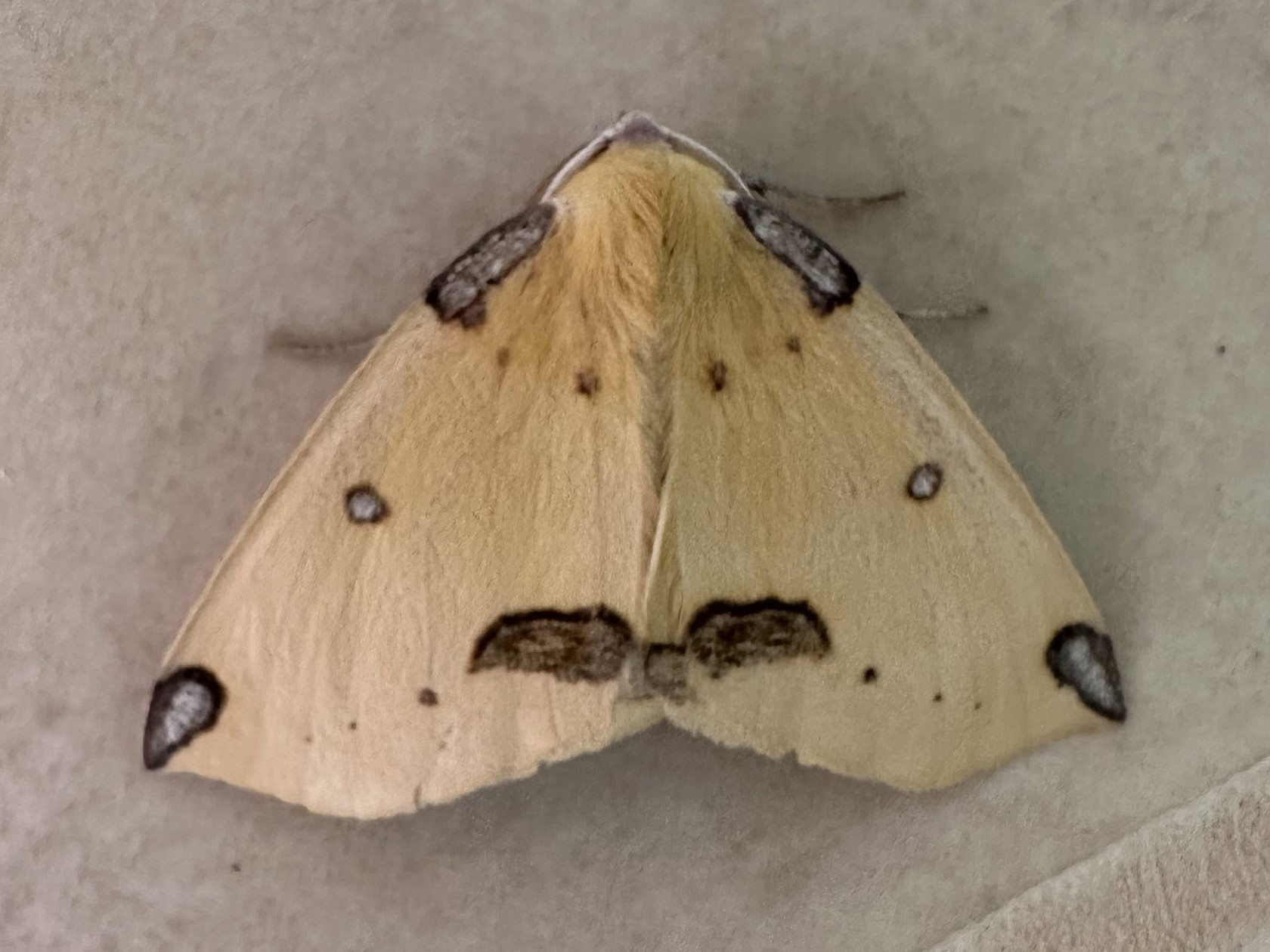
- Microsema plagiata

Scientific classification
- Kingdom: Animalia
- Phylum: Arthropoda
- Clade: Pancrustacea
- Class: Insecta
- Order: Lepidoptera
- Family: Geometridae
- Genus: Microsema; Hübner, 1823

Synonyms
- Brachystichia Warren, 1904; Gynopteryx Guenée; Lissostolodes Warren, 1895; Microsemia Gumppenberg, 1887

= Microsema =

Genus of moths

Microsema is a genus of moths in the family Geometridae.

== Species ==
The following species are recognised in the genus Microsema:

- Microsema asteria (Druce, 1892)
- Microsema attenuata Dognin, 1902
- Microsema carolinata (Oberthür, 1912)
- Microsema croceata (Stoll, 1781)
- Microsema flexilinea Warren, 1907
- Microsema gladiaria (Guenée, 1857)
- Microsema icaunaria Walker, 1860
- Microsema immaculata (Warren, 1897)
- Microsema maldama (Schaus, 1901)
- Microsema numicusaria Walker, 1860
- Microsema plagiata (Butler, 1882)
- Microsema punctinotata Prout, 1910
- Microsema quadripunctaria Hübner, 1823
- Microsema rubedinaria (Mabille, 1890)
- Microsema subcarnea (Warren, 1895)
- Microsema subobscurata Walker
- Microsema vulgaris (Butler, 1881)
- BOLD:AAG1220 (Microsema sp.)
- BOLD:AAG1221 (Microsema sp.)
- BOLD:AAX4218 (Microsema sp.)
- BOLD:AEA6112 (Microsema sp.)
