= Bylazora (moth) =

Scientific classification
- Kingdom: Animalia
- Phylum: Arthropoda
- Class: Insecta
- Order: Lepidoptera
- Family: Geometridae
- Subfamily: Ennominae
- Genus: Bylazora; Walker, [1863]

Genus of moths

Bylazora is a genus of moths in the family Geometridae described by Francis Walker in 1863.

== Description ==
Palpi porrect (extending forward) and hairy. A large frontal tuft present. Hindlegs with a tuft of long hair from femoro-tibial joint. Wings with crenulate outer margin. Forewings short and broad. Costa arched at base. Male with a fovea. Vein 3 from near angle of cell and veins 7 to 9 stalked from near upper angle. Vein 10 and 11 stalked and anastomosing (fusing) with vein 12. Hindwings with vein 3 from near angle of cell.

== Species ==
- Bylazora infumata Felder & Rogenhofer, 1875
- Bylazora licheniferata Walker, [1863]
- Bylazora pilicostata Walker, 1862
