= Uliura =

Scientific classification
- Kingdom: Animalia
- Phylum: Arthropoda
- Class: Insecta
- Order: Lepidoptera
- Family: Geometridae
- Genus: Uliura; Warren, 1904

Genus of moths

Uliura is a genus of moths in the family Geometridae.
