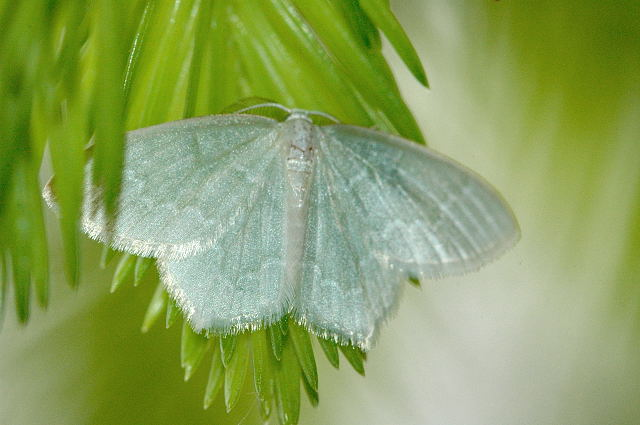
- Jodis putata
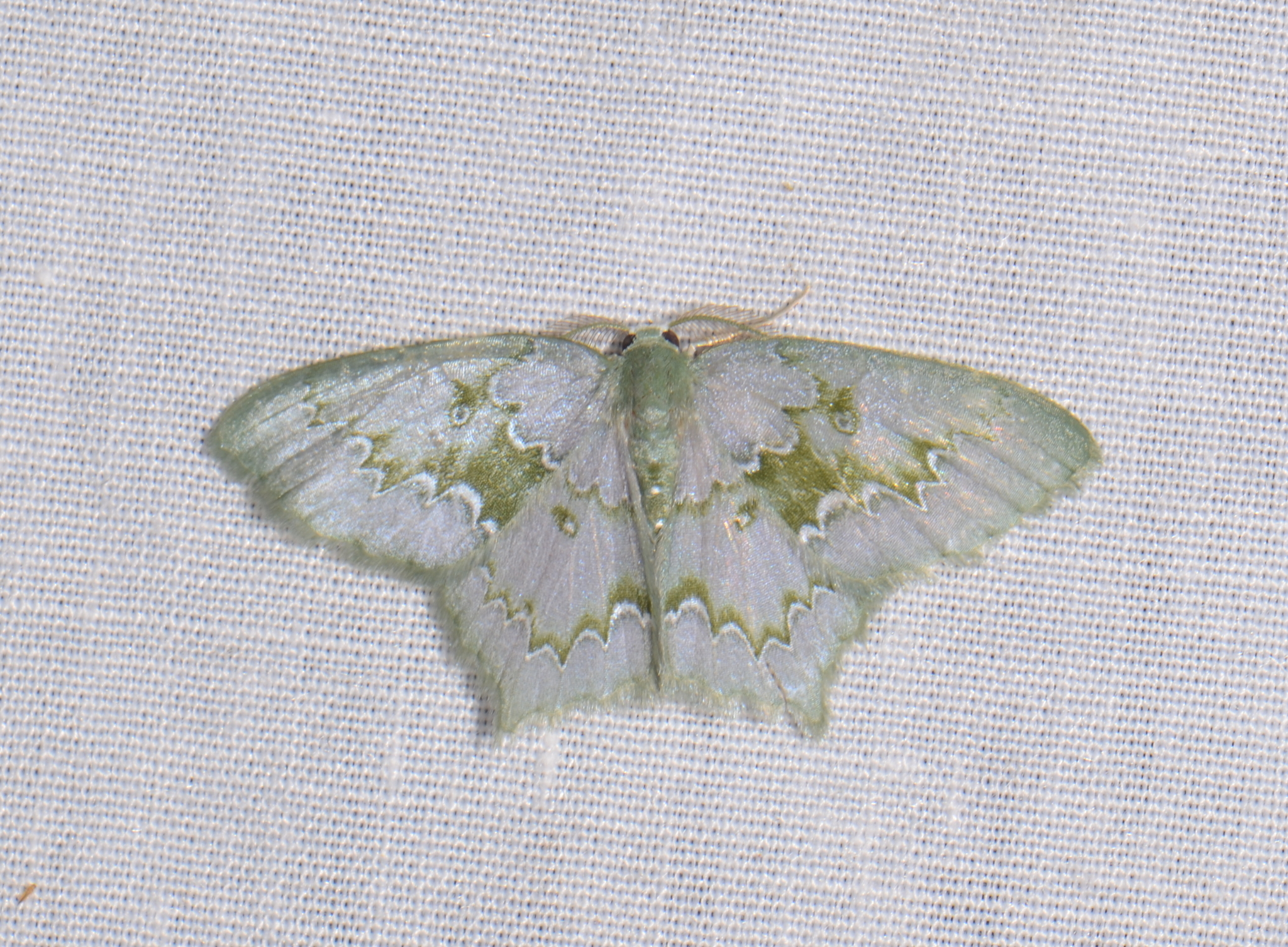
- Jodis colpostrophia

Scientific classification
- Kingdom: Animalia
- Phylum: Arthropoda
- Clade: Pancrustacea
- Class: Insecta
- Order: Lepidoptera
- Family: Geometridae
- Tribe: Hemitheini
- Genus: Jodis; Hubner, 1823

Species
- Leucoglyphica Warren, 1894; Pareuchloris Warren, 1894

= Jodis =

Genus of moths

Jodis is a genus of geometer moths that belongs to the tribe Hemitheini.

== Taxonomy ==
=== Species ===
Below is a list of species that belong to the genus:

- Jodis albipuncta Warren, 1898
- Jodis altitudinis Tautel, 2016
- Jodis amamiensis Inoue, 1982
- Jodis api Holloway, 1996
- Jodis argentea Tautel, 2016
- Jodis argentilineata (Wileman, 1916)
- Jodis argutaria (Walker, 1866)
- Jodis berde Tautel, 2016
- Jodis coeruleata Warren, 1896
- Jodis colpostrophia Prout, 1917 (= Iodis colpostrophia Prout, 1917)
- Jodis ctila Prout, 1926
- Jodis delicatula Warren, 1896
- Jodis dentifascia Warren, 1897
- Jodis fulgurata (Debauche, 1941)
- Jodis inumbrata Warren, 1896
- Jodis irregularis (Warren, 1894)
- Jodis kojii Yazaki, 1995
- Jodis lactearia (Linnaeus, 1758)
- Jodis lara Prout, 1926
- Jodis mystica Tautel, 2016
- Jodis nanda (Walker, 1861)
- Jodis nepalica Inoue, 1987
- Jodis nitida Lucas, 1892
- Jodis niveovenata Oberthur, 1916
- Jodis orientalis Wehrli, 1923 (= Jodis angulata Inoue, 1961)
- Jodis pallescens (Hampson, 1891)
- Jodis placida Inoue, 1986
- Jodis praerupta (Butler, 1878)
- Jodis putata (Linnaeus, 1758)
- Jodis rantaizanensis (Wileman, 1916)
- Jodis rectisecta Herbulot, 1985
- Jodis rhabdota Prout, 1917
- Jodis spumifera Warren, 1898
- Jodis subtractata (Walker, 1863)
- Jodis sibuyana Tautel, 2016
- Jodis tibetana Chu, 1982
- Jodis tornopunctata Tautel, 2016
- Jodis undularia (Hampson, 1891)
- Jodis urosticta Prout, 1930
- Jodis vicaria (Herbulot, 1985)
- Jodis xynia Prout, 1917
