= Brephoscotosia =

Scientific classification
- Kingdom: Animalia
- Phylum: Arthropoda
- Class: Insecta
- Order: Lepidoptera
- Family: Geometridae
- Subfamily: Larentiinae
- Genus: Brephoscotosia; Warren, 1895

Genus of moths

Brephoscotosia is a genus of moths in the family Geometridae. It is considered as a synonym of Obila.

== Species ==
- Brephoscotosia catocalaria (Walker, [1866])
