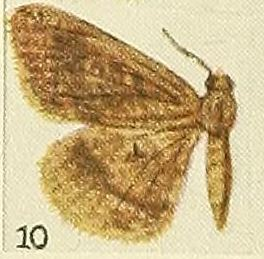

Scientific classification
- Kingdom: Animalia
- Phylum: Arthropoda
- Class: Insecta
- Order: Lepidoptera
- Family: Geometridae
- Subfamily: Ennominae
- Genus: Fulvaria; Fawcett, 1916
- Species: F. striata

Binomial name
- Fulvaria striata Fawcett, 1916

= Fulvaria =

Genus of moths

Fulvaria is a monotypic moth genus in the family Geometridae. Its only species, Fulvaria striata, is known from Kenya and from South Africa. Both the genus and species were first described by James Farish Malcolm Fawcett in 1916.
