= Bordeta =

Scientific classification
- Kingdom: Animalia
- Phylum: Arthropoda
- Class: Insecta
- Order: Lepidoptera
- Family: Geometridae
- Subfamily: Ennominae
- Genus: Bordeta; Walker, [1865]

Genus of moths

Bordeta is a genus of moths in the family Geometridae.

== Species ==
- Bordeta quadriplagiata Walker, [1865]
