= Brachurapteryx =

Scientific classification
- Kingdom: Animalia
- Phylum: Arthropoda
- Class: Insecta
- Order: Lepidoptera
- Family: Geometridae
- Subfamily: Ennominae
- Genus: Brachurapteryx; Warren, 1894

Genus of moths

Brachurapteryx is a genus of moths in the family Geometridae.

== Species ==
- Brachurapteryx breviaria (Hübner, [1831])
