= Wilemania =

Scientific classification
- Kingdom: Animalia
- Phylum: Arthropoda
- Clade: Pancrustacea
- Class: Insecta
- Order: Lepidoptera
- Family: Geometridae
- Genus: Wilemania; Prout, 1928

Genus of moths

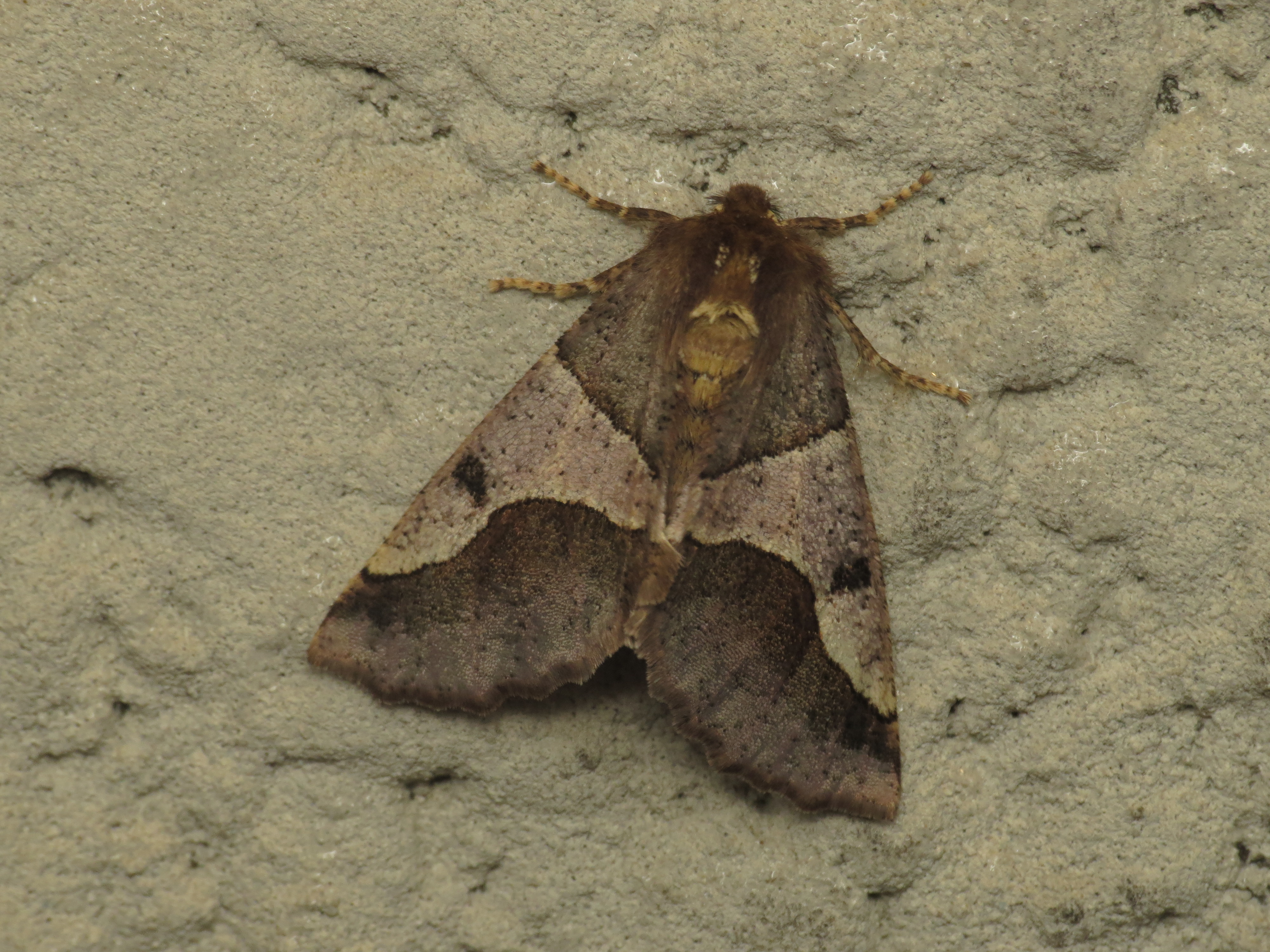
Wilemania nitobei Nitobe, 1907, Pyeongchang, South Korea, 13 October 2014.

Wilemania is a genus of moths in the family Geometridae.
