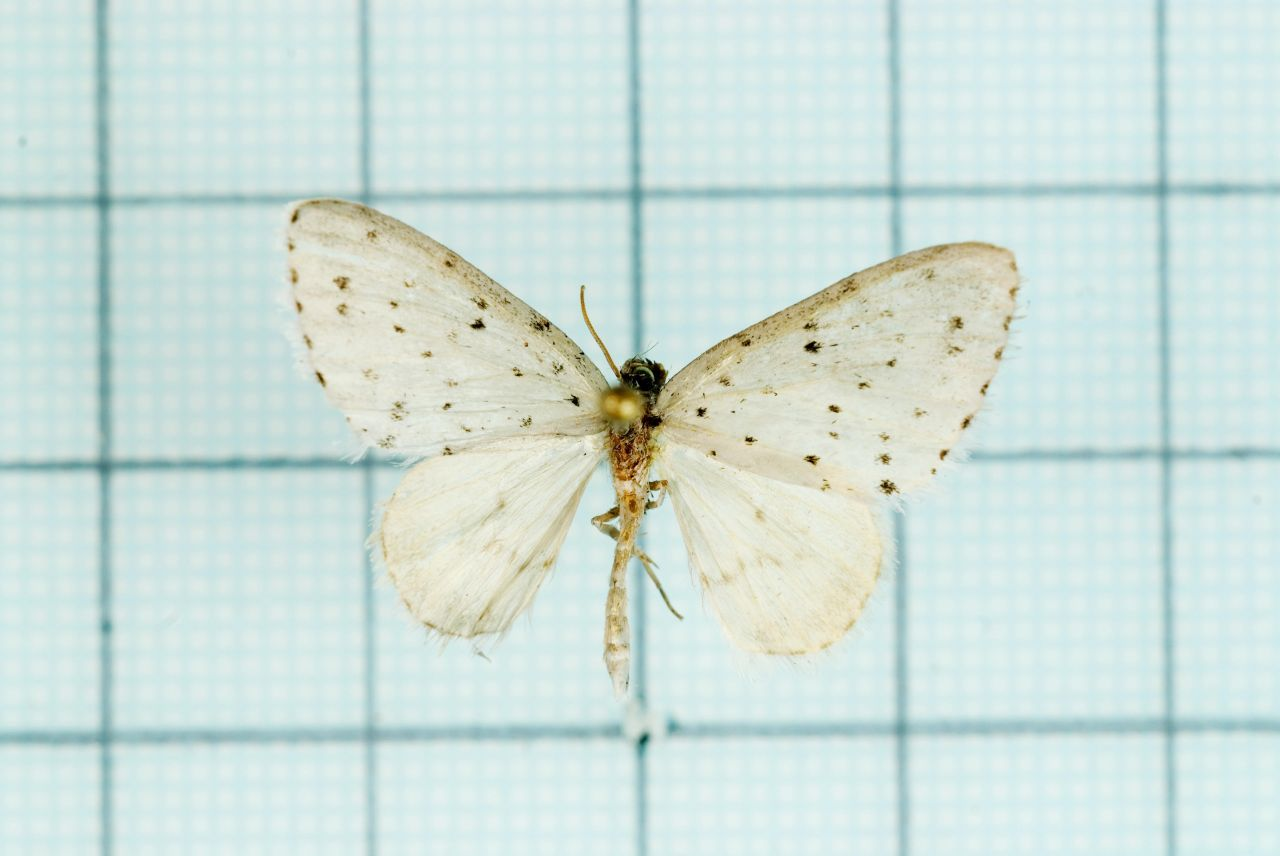
- Naxidia punctata

Scientific classification
- Kingdom: Animalia
- Phylum: Arthropoda
- Class: Insecta
- Order: Lepidoptera
- Family: Geometridae
- Subfamily: Larentiinae
- Genus: Naxidia; Hampson, 1895

Synonyms
- Binareolaria Wehrli, 1931

= Naxidia =

Genus of moths

Naxidia is a genus of moths in the family Geometridae.

== Species ==
- Naxidia glaphyra (Wehrli, 1931)
- Naxidia hypocyrta (Wehrli, 1931)
- Naxidia irrorata (Moore, 1888)
- Naxidia maculata (Butler, 1879)
- Naxidia nudariata (Poujade, 1895)
- Naxidia punctata (Butler, 1880)
- Naxidia roseni (Wehrli, 1931)
- Naxidia semiobscura (Inoue, 1955)
