= Strepsichlora =

Scientific classification
- Kingdom: Animalia
- Phylum: Arthropoda
- Clade: Pancrustacea
- Class: Insecta
- Order: Lepidoptera
- Family: Geometridae
- Genus: Strepsichlora; Warren, 1907

Synonyms
- Blechromopsis Warren, 1912

Genus of moths

Strepsichlora is a genus of moths in the family Geometridae described by Warren in 1907.

== Species ==
- Strepsichlora acutilunata Warren, 1907
  - Strepsichlora acutilunata ssp. dissimilis Warren, 1912
- Strepsichlora costipicta Warren, 1912
- Strepsichlora inquinata Warren, 1903
- Strepsichlora megaspila Warren, 1912
- Strepsichlora nubifera Warren, 1912
- Strepsichlora remissa Prout, 1916
