= Warneckia =

Scientific classification
- Kingdom: Animalia
- Phylum: Arthropoda
- Class: Insecta
- Order: Lepidoptera
- Family: Geometridae
- Subfamily: Oenochrominae
- Genus: Warneckia; Sick, 1938

Genus of moths

Warneckia is a genus of moths in the family Geometridae.
