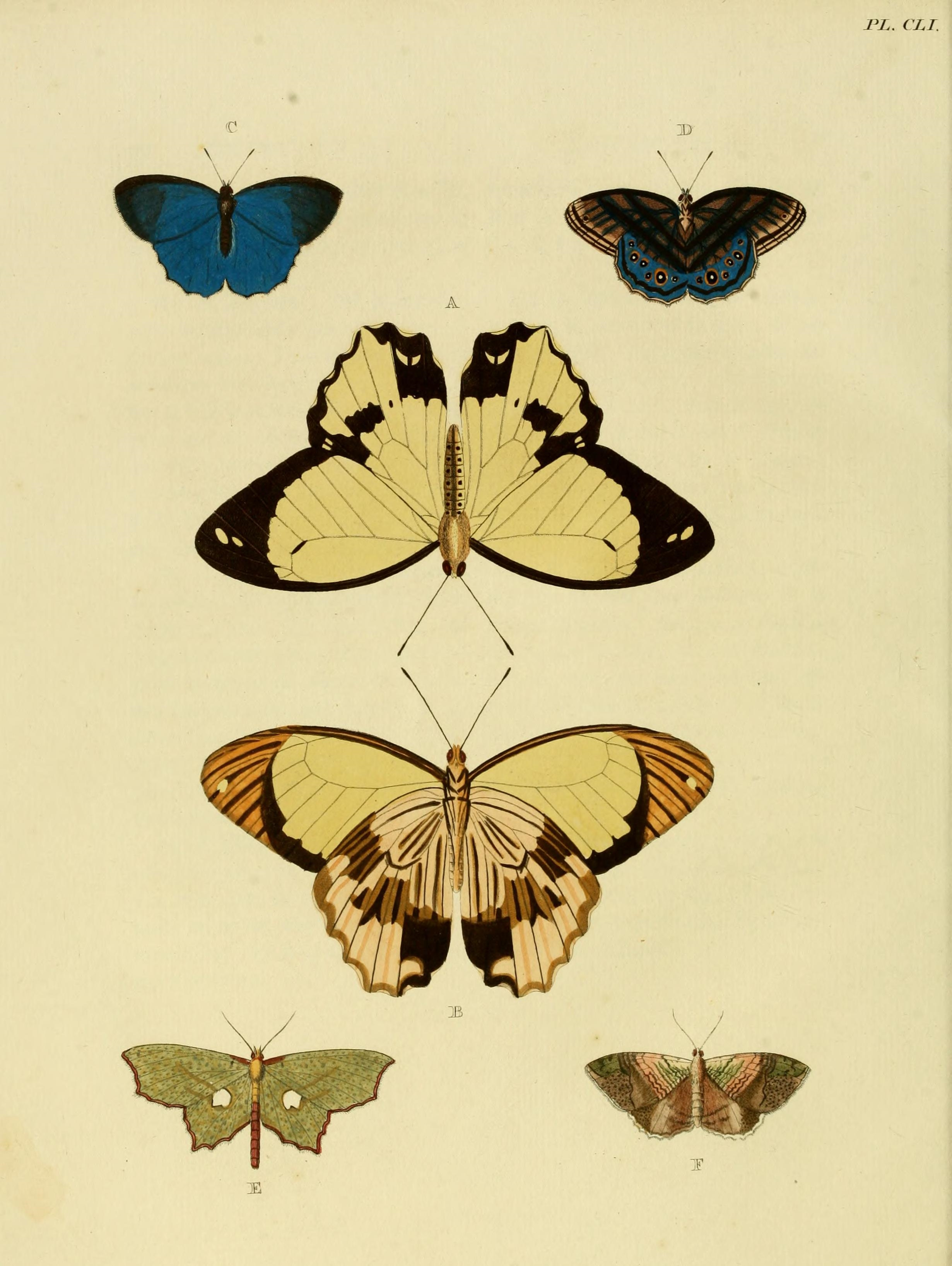

Scientific classification
- Kingdom: Animalia
- Phylum: Arthropoda
- Class: Insecta
- Order: Lepidoptera
- Family: Geometridae
- Tribe: Hydriomenini
- Genus: Pterocypha; Herrich-Schäffer, 1855

Synonyms
- Calliscotus Butler, 1878

= Pterocypha =

Genus of moths

Pterocypha is a genus of moths in the family Geometridae first described by Gottlieb August Wilhelm Herrich-Schäffer in 1855.

== Species ==
- Pterocypha defensata Walker, 1862
- Pterocypha floridata Walker, [1863]
- Pterocypha gibbosaria Herrich-Schäffer, [1855]
- Pterocypha lezardata Herbulot, 1988
