= Bursadopsis =

Scientific classification
- Kingdom: Animalia
- Phylum: Arthropoda
- Class: Insecta
- Order: Lepidoptera
- Family: Geometridae
- Subfamily: Ennominae
- Genus: Bursadopsis; Warren, 1899

Genus of moths

Bursadopsis is a genus of moths in the family Geometridae.

== Species ==
- Bursadopsis praeflavata Warren, 1899
