= Bombycodes =

Scientific classification
- Kingdom: Animalia
- Phylum: Arthropoda
- Class: Insecta
- Order: Lepidoptera
- Family: Geometridae
- Subfamily: Ennominae
- Genus: Bombycodes; Guenée in Boisduval & Guenée, 1857

Genus of moths

Bombycodes is a genus of moths in the family Geometridae.

== Species ==
- Bombycodes aspilaria Guenée, 1857
- Bombycodes fumosa (Warren, 1894)
