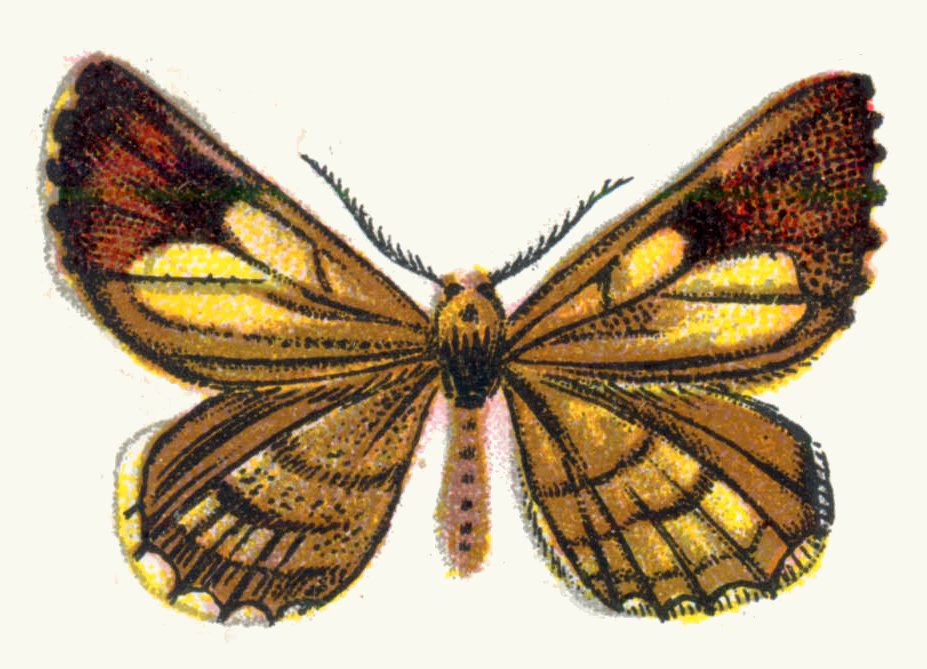
- Bupalus piniaria

Scientific classification
- Kingdom: Animalia
- Phylum: Arthropoda
- Class: Insecta
- Order: Lepidoptera
- Family: Geometridae
- Subfamily: Ennominae
- Tribe: Bupalini
- Genus: Bupalus; Leach, 1815

= Bupalus (moth) =

Genus of moths

Bupalus is a genus of moths in the family Geometridae. The genus was raised by the English zoologist William Elford Leach, in 1815 and is the name of a 6th-century BC Greek sculptor.

== Selected species ==
- Bupalus piniaria (Linnaeus, 1758) – bordered white
- Bupalus vestalis Staudinger, 1897
