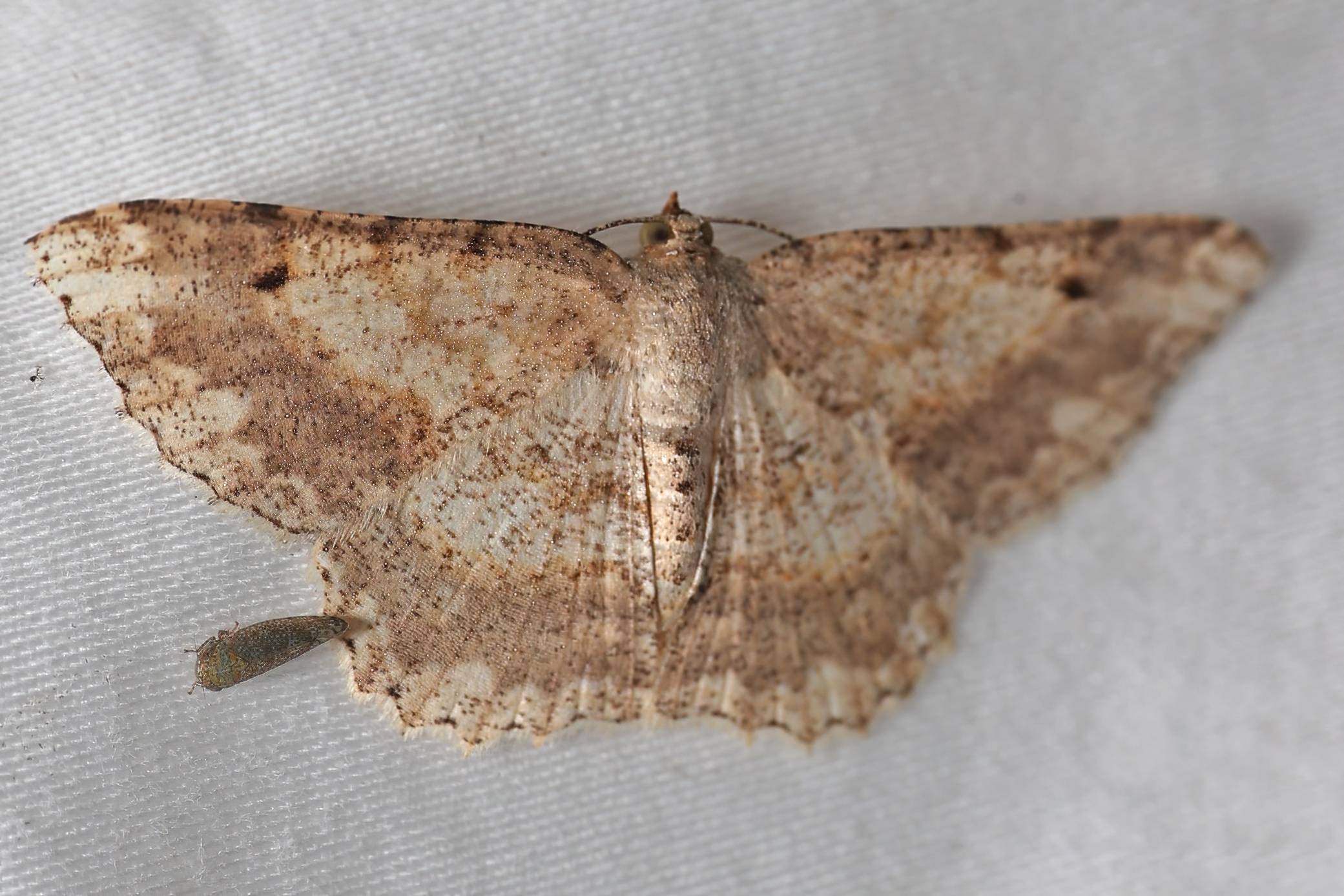
- Luxiaria sp., Sri Lanka

Scientific classification
- Kingdom: Animalia
- Phylum: Arthropoda
- Class: Insecta
- Order: Lepidoptera
- Family: Geometridae
- Subfamily: Ennominae
- Genus: Luxiaria; Walker, 1860

Synonyms
- Bithiodes Warren, 1894; Euippe Meyrick, 1886; Hypochariessa Turner, 1947; Idiotephra Warren, 1899

= Luxiaria =

Genus of moths

Luxiaria is a genus of moths in the family Geometridae first described by Francis Walker in 1860.

== Description ==
Palpi obliquely porrect (extending forward), where the second joint roughly scaled. Antennae minutely ciliated. Hind tibia of male dilated and with a longitudinal fold containing a ridge of silken hair. Forewings produced and somewhat acute at apex. Vein 3 from angle of cell and veins 7, 8 and 9 stalked, from upper angle. Vein 10 absent and vein 11 free.

== Selected species ==
- Luxiaria amasa (Butler, 1878)
- Luxiaria mitorrhaphes Prout, 1925
- Luxiaria phyllosaria Walker, 1860
