= Buttia =

Scientific classification
- Kingdom: Animalia
- Phylum: Arthropoda
- Class: Insecta
- Order: Lepidoptera
- Family: Geometridae
- Subfamily: Ennominae
- Genus: Buttia; Warren, 1904
- Species: B. noctuodes

Binomial name
- Buttia noctuodes Warren, 1904

Genus of moths

Buttia is a monotypic moth genus in the family Geometridae described by Warren in 1904. Its only species, Buttia noctuodes, was described by the same author in the same year.
