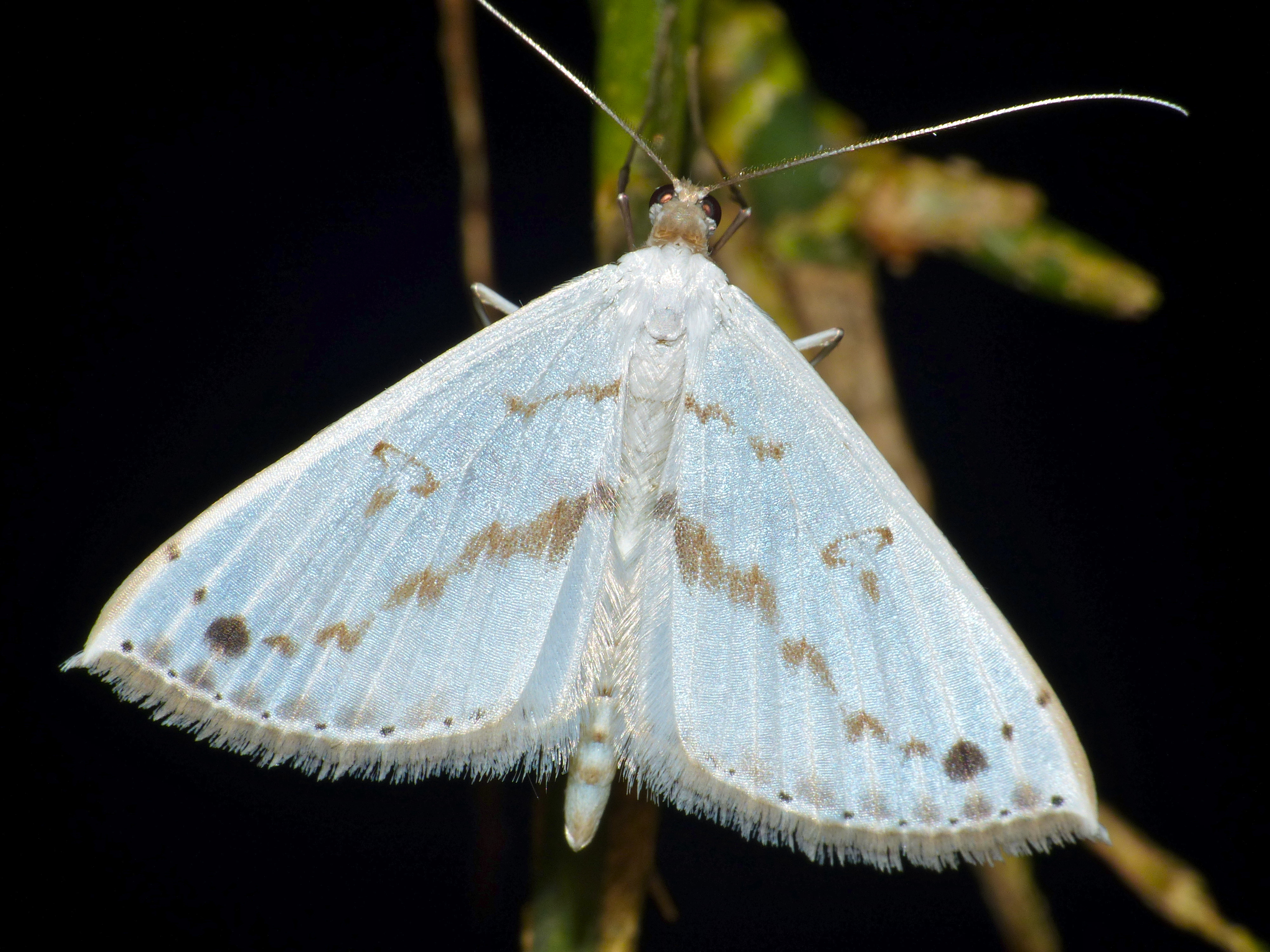
- Derambila sp.

Scientific classification
- Kingdom: Animalia
- Phylum: Arthropoda
- Class: Insecta
- Order: Lepidoptera
- Family: Geometridae
- Subfamily: Desmobathrinae; Meyrick, 1886

= Desmobathrinae =

Subfamily of moths

Desmobathrinae is a subfamily of the moth family Geometridae described by Edward Meyrick in 1886.

== Recognized genera ==
Tribe Desmobathrini

- Alex Walker, 1863
- Antozola Herbulot, 1992
- Apatadelpha Prout, 1910
- Brachytrita Swinhoe, 1904
- Caledophia Holloway, 1979
- Callipotnia Warren, 1899
- Celerena Walker, 1862
- Conolophia Warren, 1894
- Derambila Walker, 1863
- Derxena Walker, 1866
- Dolerophyle Warren, 1894
- Dolichoneura Warren, 1894
- Encryphia Turner, 1904
- Foveabathra Holloway, 1996
- Leptoctenopsis Warren, 1895
- Noreia Walker, 1861
- Ophiogramma Hübner, 1831
- Ozola Walker, 1861
- Panagropsis Warren, 1894

Tribe Eumeleini

- Eumelea Duncan [& Westwood], 1841
