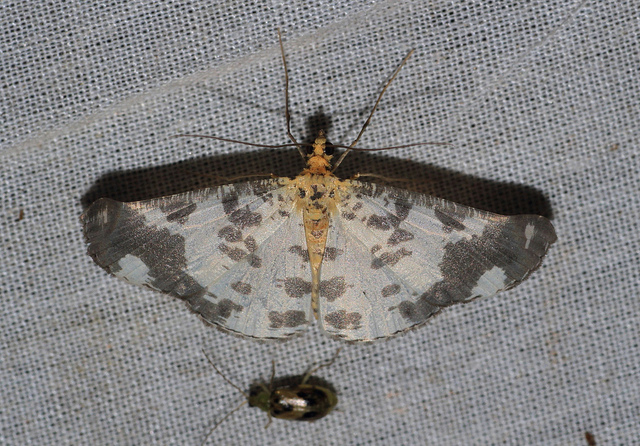
- Found in Borneo

Scientific classification
- Domain: Eukaryota
- Kingdom: Animalia
- Phylum: Arthropoda
- Class: Insecta
- Order: Lepidoptera
- Family: Geometridae
- Genus: Ozola
- Species: O. liwana

Binomial name
- Ozola liwana (Sommerer, 1995)

Synonyms
- Metabraxas falcipennis Moore, 1888 [misidentification]

= Ozola liwana =

Species of moth

Ozola liwana is a geometer moth in the subfamily Desmobathrinae first described by Manfred Sommerer in 1995.

== Characteristics ==
Externally this species is very similar to Ozola falcipennis (Moore, 1888).

== Distribution and habitat ==
It is found in Sumatra and Borneo. The species occurs mainly in the upper montane zone.
