= Ozola microniaria =

Scientific classification
- Kingdom: Animalia
- Phylum: Arthropoda
- Clade: Pancrustacea
- Class: Insecta
- Order: Lepidoptera
- Family: Geometridae
- Genus: Ozola
- Species: O. microniaria

Binomial name
- Ozola microniaria Walker, 1862

Species of moth

Ozola microniaria is a moth of the family Geometridae first described by Francis Walker in 1862. It is found in Sri Lanka.

Host plants include Premna species.
