= Alex (moth) =

Scientific classification
- Kingdom: Animalia
- Phylum: Arthropoda
- Class: Insecta
- Order: Lepidoptera
- Family: Geometridae
- Subfamily: Desmobathrinae
- Genus: Alex; Walker, [1863]

Synonyms
- Gamoruna Moore, 1888; Orgalima Walker, 1866

Genus of geometer moths

Alex is a genus of moths in the family Geometridae.

== Description ==
Palpi porrect (extending forward), where the second joint reaching beyond the sharp frontal tuft and clothed with hair. Third joint long and naked. Forewings somewhat produced and acute at apex. Vein 3 from near angle of cell and vein 5 from middle of discocellulars. Veins 7, 8 and 9 stalked and veins 10 and 11 stalked and anastomosing (fusing) with vein 12. Hindwings with vein 3 from near angle of cell and vein 5 from above middle of discocellulars.

== Species ==
- Alex aemula (Warren, 1894)
- Alex continuaria (Walker, 1866)
- Alex palparia (Walker, 1861)
