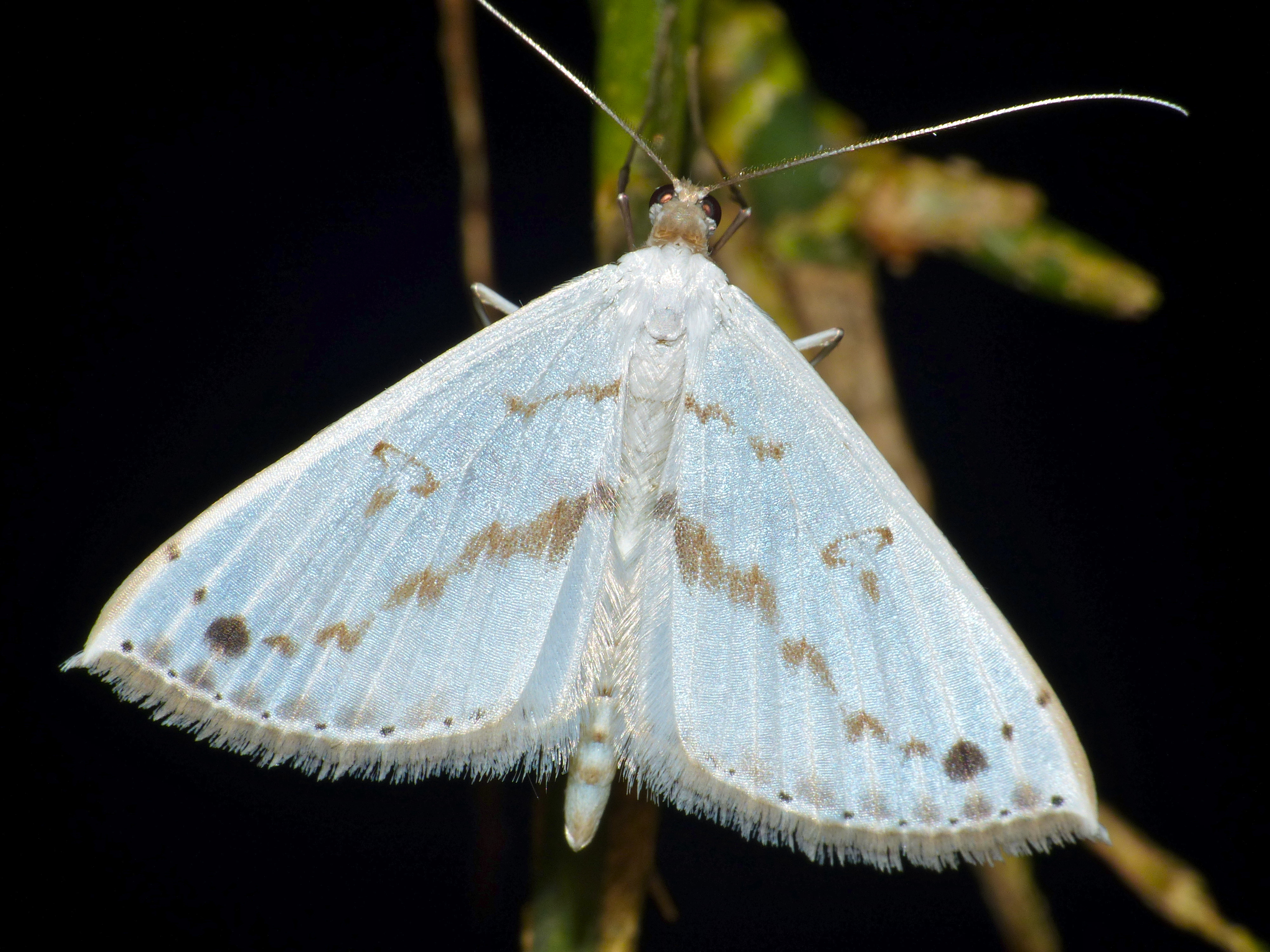
- Derambila sp. from Malaysia

Scientific classification
- Kingdom: Animalia
- Phylum: Arthropoda
- Clade: Pancrustacea
- Class: Insecta
- Order: Lepidoptera
- Family: Geometridae
- Subfamily: Desmobathrinae
- Genus: Derambila; Walker, [1863]

Synonyms
- Chionopteryx Snellen, 1873; Corium Prout, 1910; Holostixa Swinhoe, 1902; Rambara Moore, 1887

= Derambila =

Genus of moths

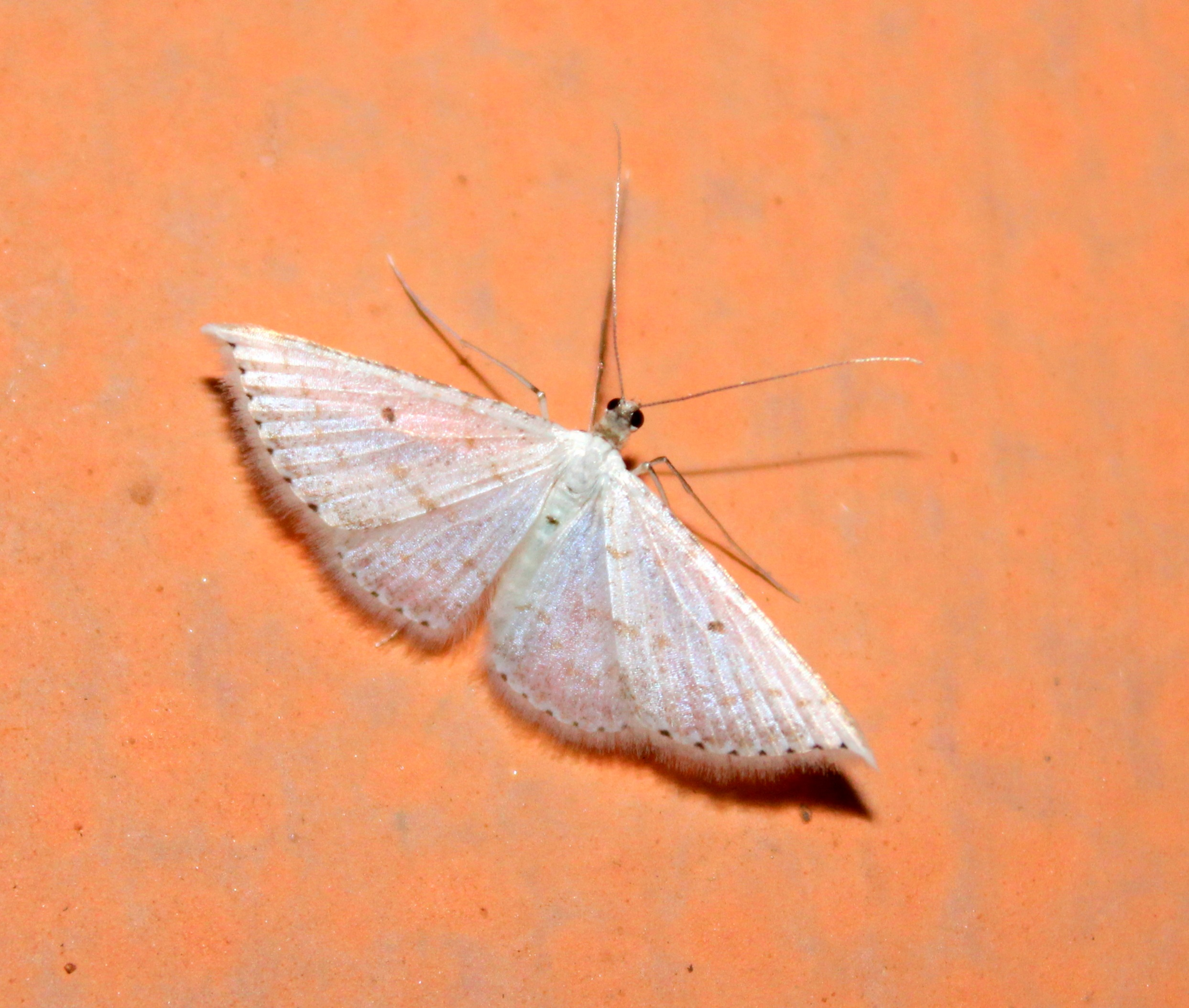
Derambila sp. from Sri Lanka

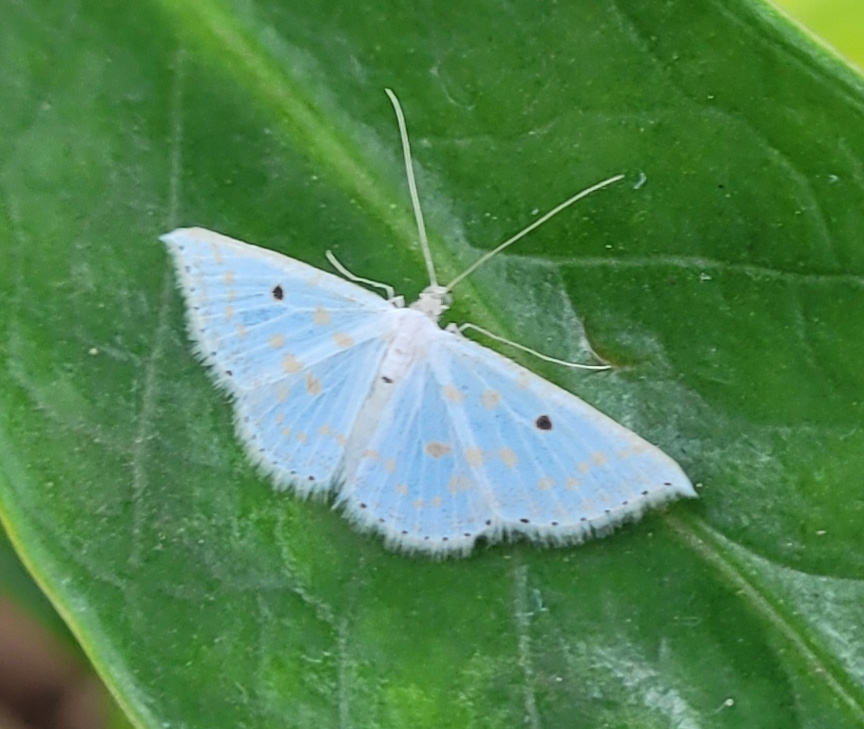
Derambila cf. dentiscripta from the Philippines

Derambila is a genus of moths in the family Geometridae first described by Francis Walker in 1863.

== Description ==
Its palpi are porrect (extending forward) and hairy. Antennae long and slender, minutely serrate in male, which is ciliated in female. Legs very long and slender. Fore tibia short and hind tibia with fold and tuft, and without spurs in female. Forewings with vein 3 from long before angle of cell. Veins 7 to 9 stalked from before upper angle and vein 10 absent. Vein 11 becoming coincident with vein 12. Hindwings with vein 3 from before angle of cell. Vein 5 from middle of discocellulars and vein 6 and 7 stalked.

== Species ==
- Derambila alucitaria (Snellen, 1873)
- Derambila biokensis Herbulot, 1998
- Derambila candidissima Prout
- Derambila costipunctata Warren, 1905
- Derambila catharina Prout, 1910
- Derambila costata (Warren, 1896)
- Derambila delostigma Prout, 1915
- Derambila dentifera (Moore, 1888)
- Derambila dentiscripta (Bastelberger, 1909)
- Derambila fragilis (Butler, 1880)
- Derambila herbuloti Holloway, 1996
- Derambila hyperphyes (Prout, 1911)
- Derambila idiosceles Turner, 1930
- Derambila iridoptera (Prout, 1913)
- Derambila jacksoni Prout, 1915
- Derambila larula Bastelberger, 1909
- Derambila liosceles Turner, 1930
- Derambila livens Prout, 1931
- Derambila lumenaria (Geyer, 1832)
- Derambila macritibia Prout, 1929
- Derambila manca (Swinhoe, 1902)
- Derambila manfredi Holloway, 1996
- Derambila marginepunctata Bastelberger, 1909
- Derambila melagonata (Walker, [1863])
- Derambila niphosphaeras (Prout, 1934)
- Derambila permensata (Walker, [1863])
- Derambila propages Prout, 1926
- Derambila puella (Butler, 1880)
- Derambila punctisignata Walker, [1863]
- Derambila rectiscripta Prout
- Derambila saponaria (Guenée, 1857)
- Derambila satelliata Walker
- Derambila syllaria (Swinhoe, 1904)
- Derambila synecdema Prout, 1910
- Derambila thearia (Swinhoe, 1904)
- Derambila thrombocnemis Prout, 1929
- Derambila zanclopterata (Walker, [1863])
- Derambila zinctaria (Guenée, 1857)
