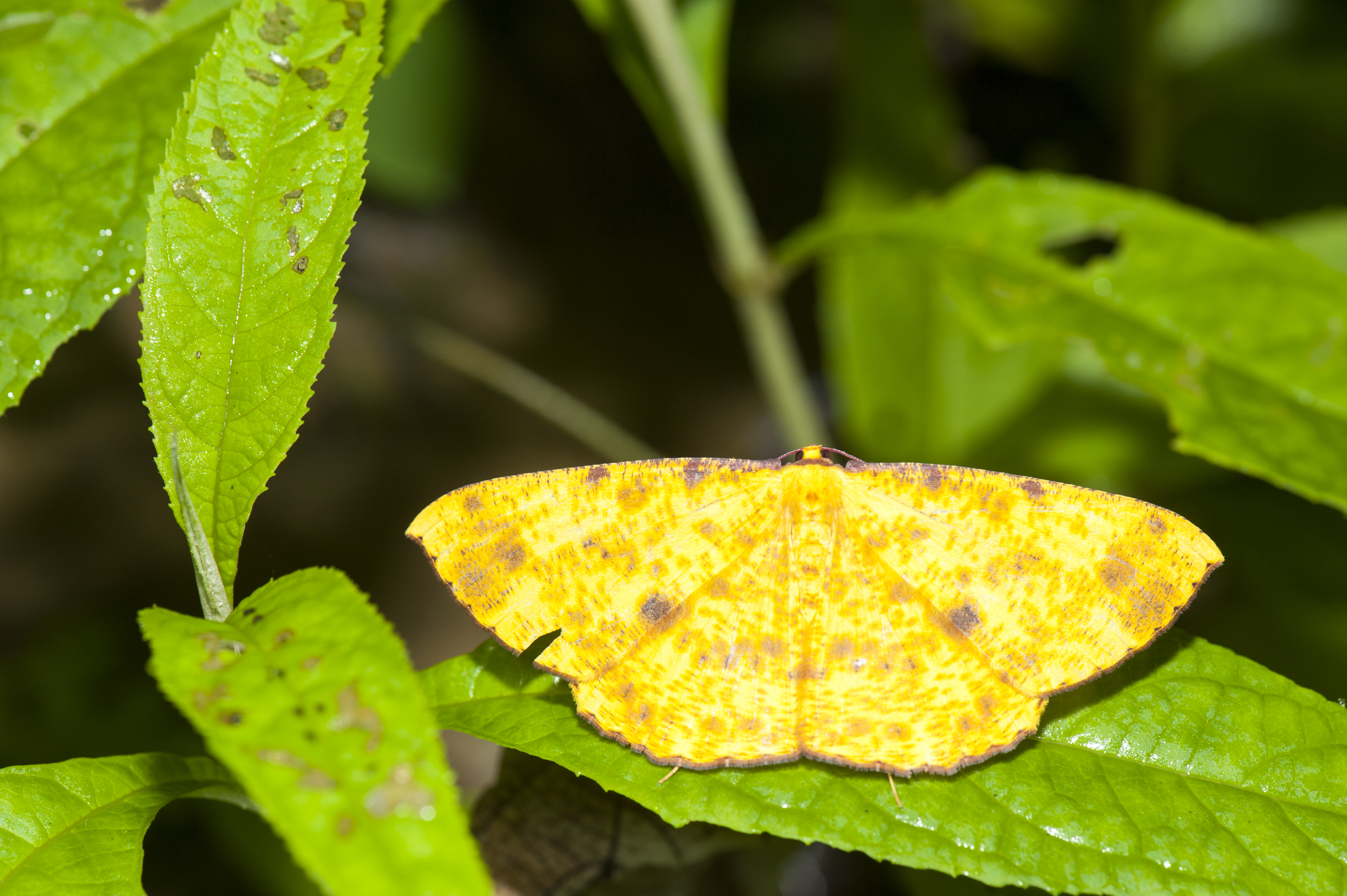
- Female
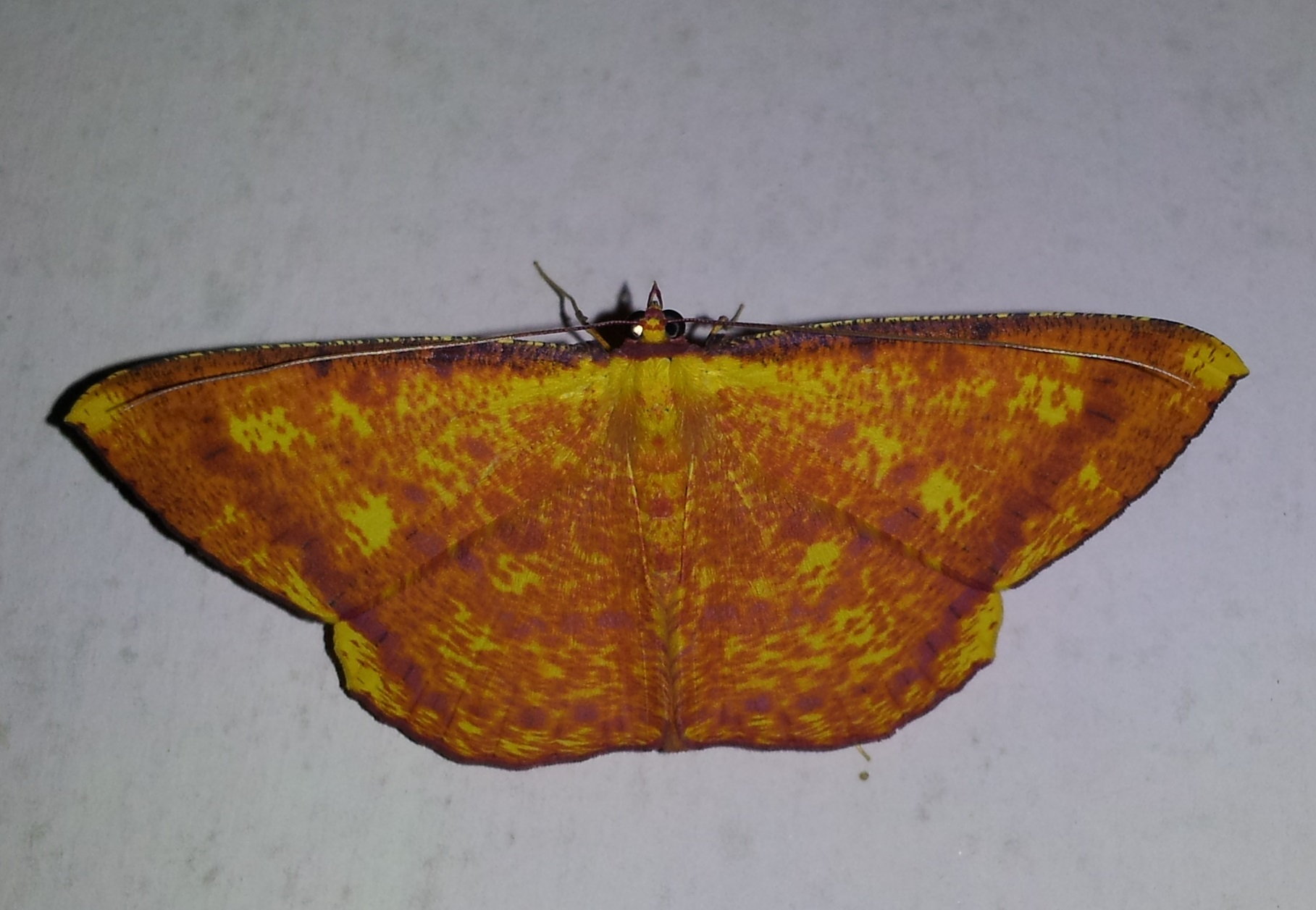
- Male

Scientific classification
- Kingdom: Animalia
- Phylum: Arthropoda
- Clade: Pancrustacea
- Class: Insecta
- Order: Lepidoptera
- Family: Geometridae
- Genus: Eumelea
- Species: E. ludovicata

Binomial name
- Eumelea ludovicata (Guenée, 1858)

Synonyms
- Eumelea aureliata Guenée, 1857; Eumelea ludovicata Guenée; Prout, 1921

= Eumelea ludovicata =

Species of moth

Eumelea ludovicata is a species of moth in the family Geometridae first described by Achille Guenée in 1858. It is found in Indo-Australian tropics of India, Sri Lanka, east to Singapore, Taiwan, the Solomon Islands and Guam.

== Biology ==
The adult has a fluttering, erratic flight. The male is more reddish, whereas female is yellowish.

The caterpillar has a cylindrical yellowish-white body with many longitudinal lines. Setae minute and spiracles greenish. Its round-shaped head is yellowish white with rusty markings. Hairs are present, which are short, erect and thick. Host plant is always Macaranga species. Pupa elongate with semi-elliptical, flattened cremaster. Pupal case for the proboscis and antennae extends free. Caterpillar resting straight at 60 degrees to the leaf surface, which is often confused as a twig. Pupation occurs between two leaves fastened together coated inside with silk.

== Subspecies ==
Eight subspecies have been recognized.

- Eumelea ludovicata biclarata Prout, 1931
- Eumelea ludovicata cupreata Warren, 1897
- Eumelea ludovicata enantia Prout, 1921
- Eumelea ludovicata fulvida Prout, 1921
- Eumelea ludovicata referta Prout, 1931
- Eumelea ludovicata rhodeogyna Prout, 1925
- Eumelea ludovicata rubra Prout, 1921
- Eumelea ludovicata salomonis Prout, 1921

== Gallery ==
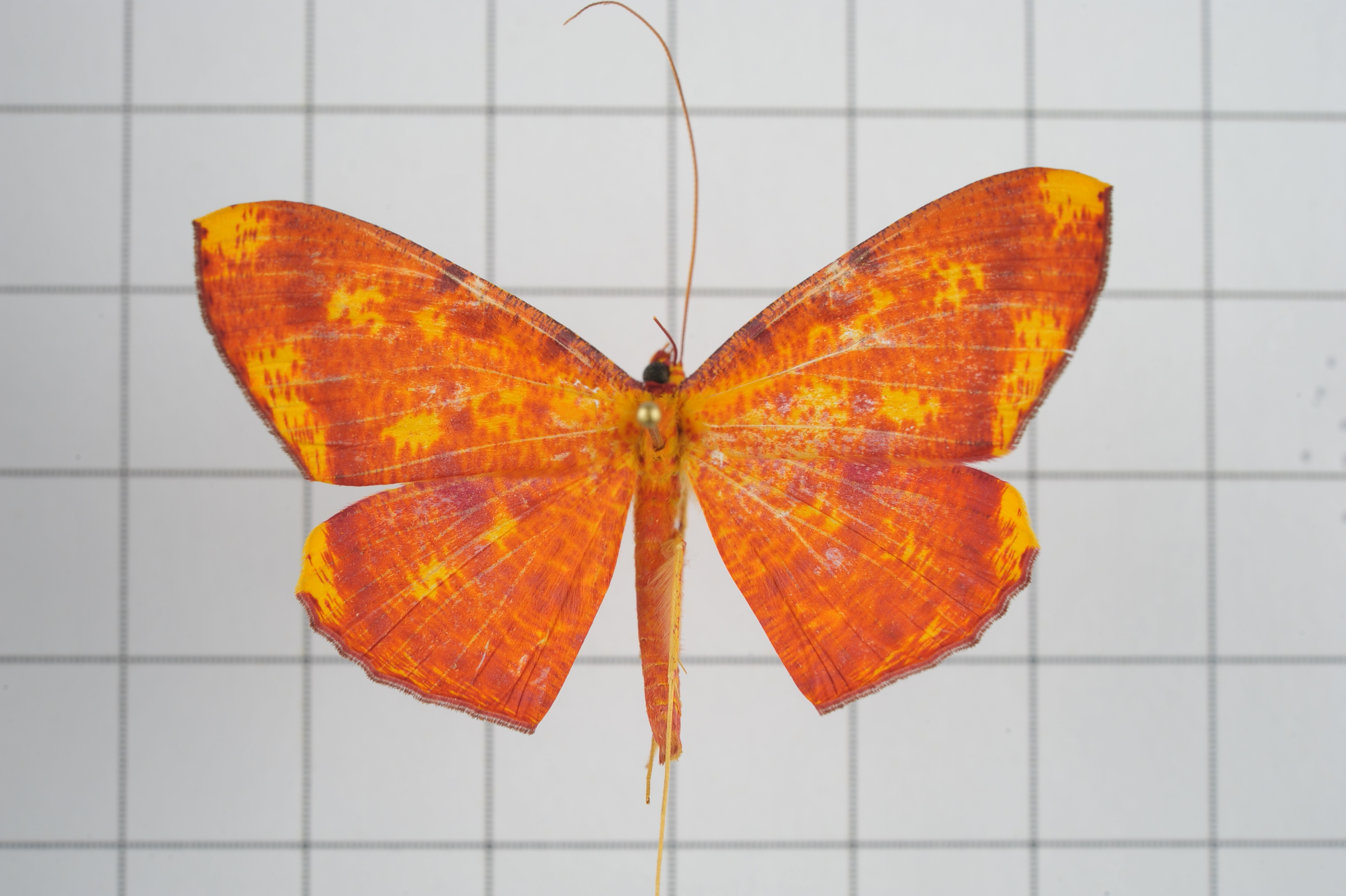
Male dorsal side

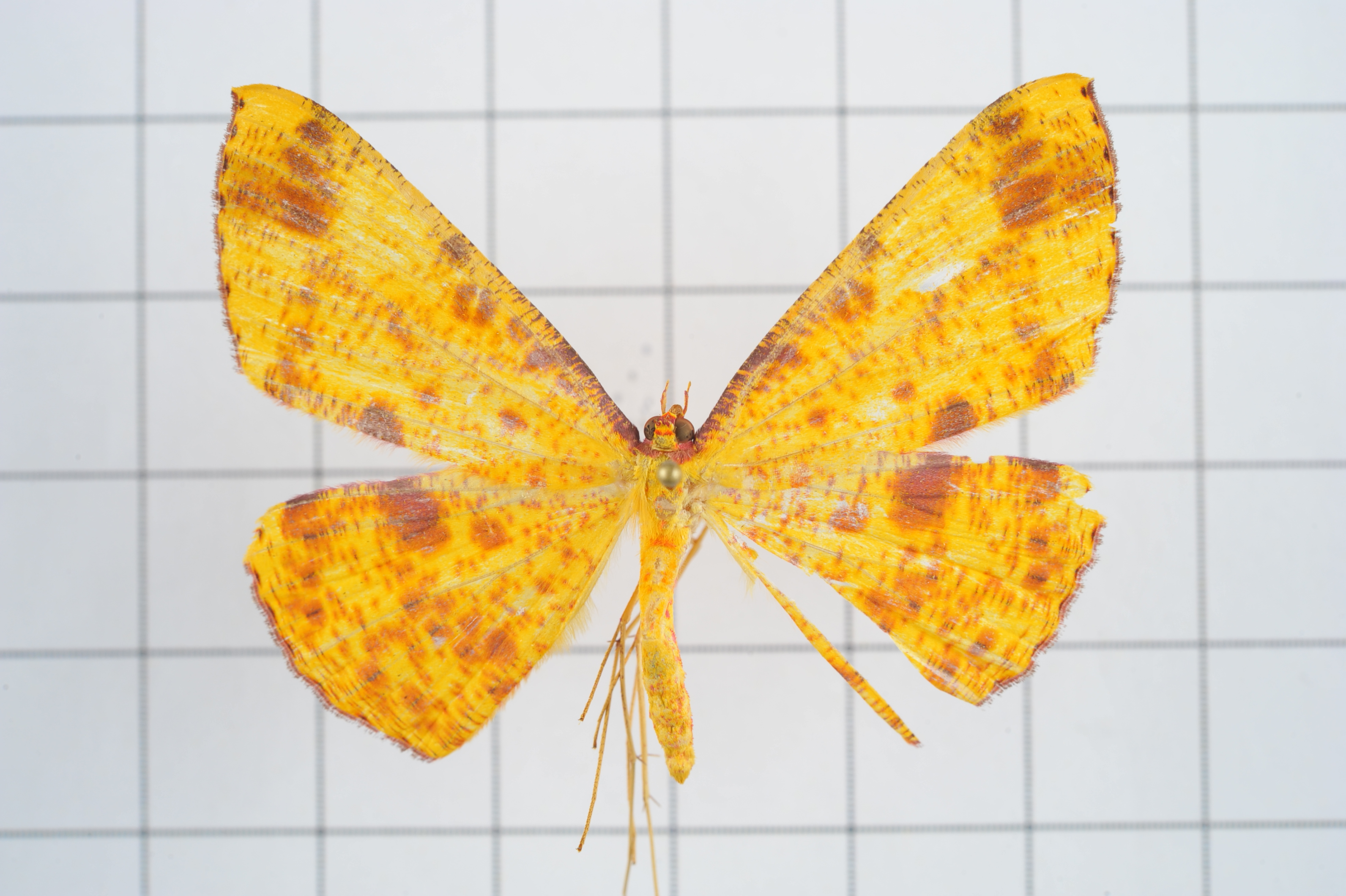
Female dorsal side

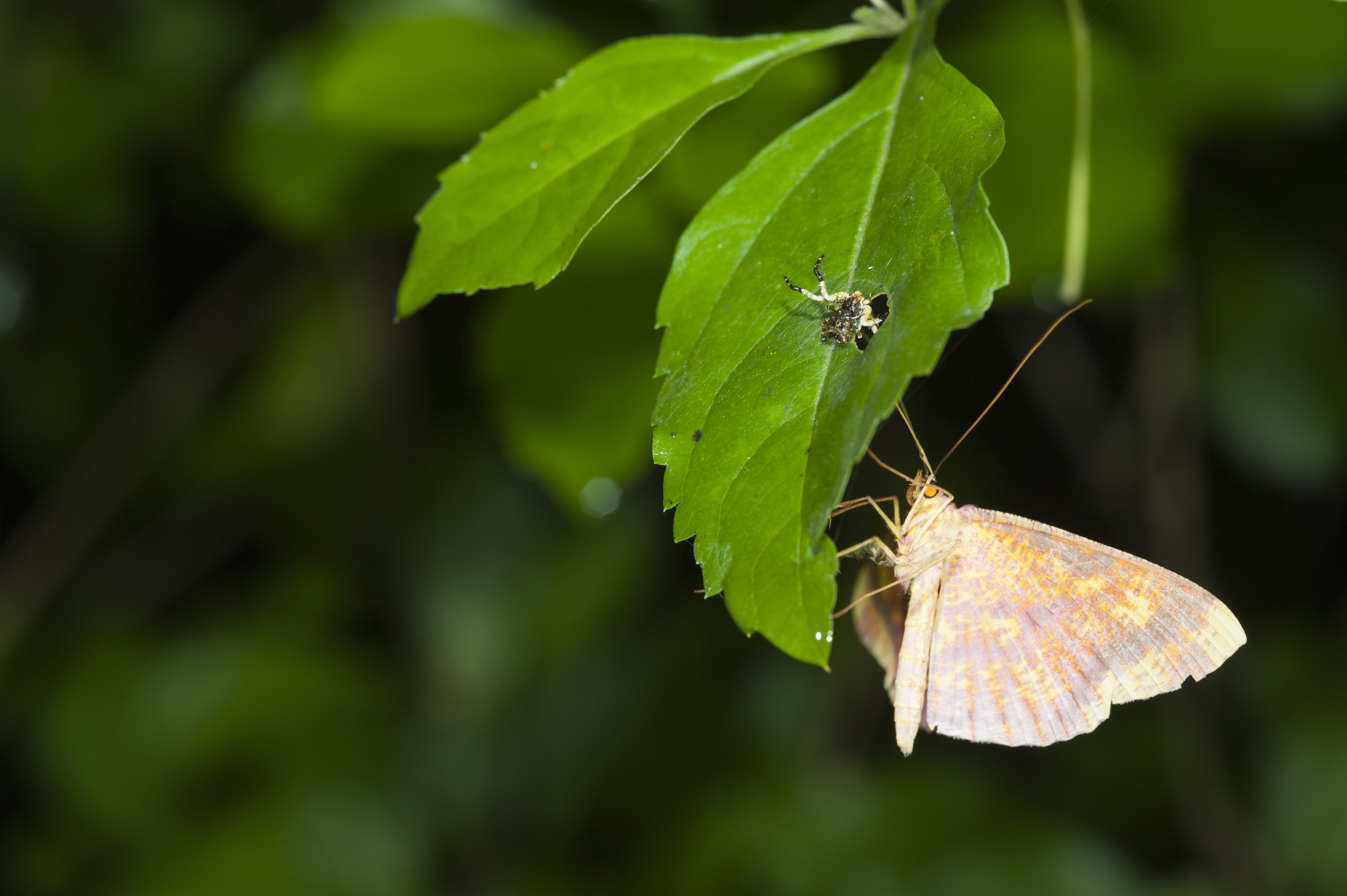
Underside

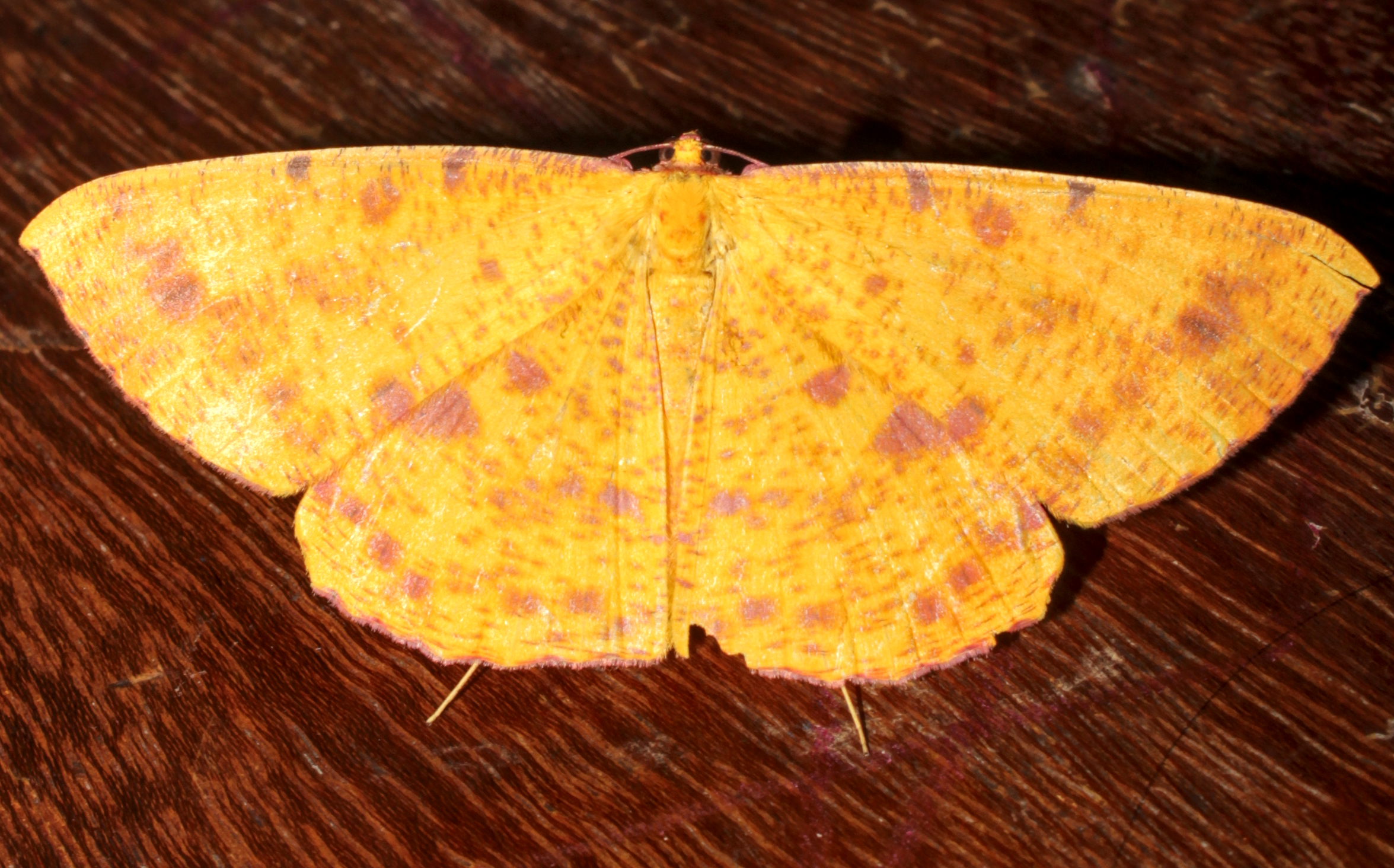
dorsal side

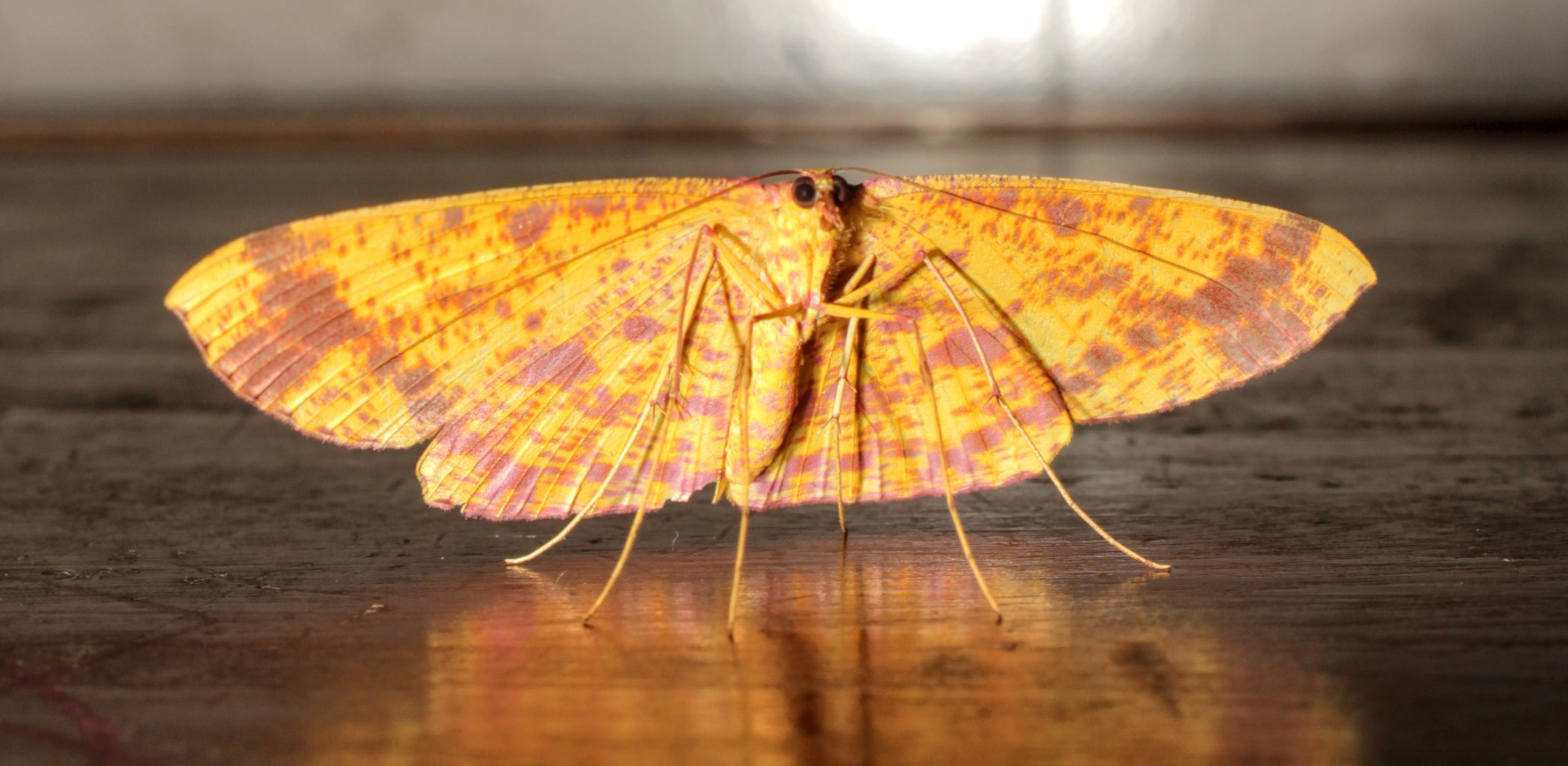
underside
