= Derambila saponaria =

Scientific classification
- Kingdom: Animalia
- Phylum: Arthropoda
- Clade: Pancrustacea
- Class: Insecta
- Order: Lepidoptera
- Family: Geometridae
- Genus: Derambila
- Species: D. saponaria

Binomial name
- Derambila saponaria (Guenée, 1858)

Synonyms
- Zanclopteryx saponaria Guenée, 1857; Zanclopteryx infelix Swinhoe, 1885

Species of moth

Derambila saponaria is a moth of the family Geometridae first described by Achille Guenée in 1858. It is found in Sri Lanka, India, Sumatra and Borneo.

Prominent black dots are found along the wing margins. The Taiwan population is sometimes classified as a subspecies - Derambila saponaria fragilis Butler, 1880 or as a separate species - Derambila fragilis (Butler, 1880).
