= Dolerophyle =

Scientific classification
- Domain: Eukaryota
- Kingdom: Animalia
- Phylum: Arthropoda
- Class: Insecta
- Order: Lepidoptera
- Family: Geometridae
- Subfamily: Desmobathrinae
- Genus: Dolerophyle; Warren, 1894
- Species: D. nerisaria

Binomial name
- Dolerophyle nerisaria (Walker, 1860)

Genus of moths

Dolerophyle is a monotypic moth genus in the family Geometridae described by William Warren in 1894. Its only species, Dolerophyle nerisaria, was described by Francis Walker in 1860. It is found in Brazil.
