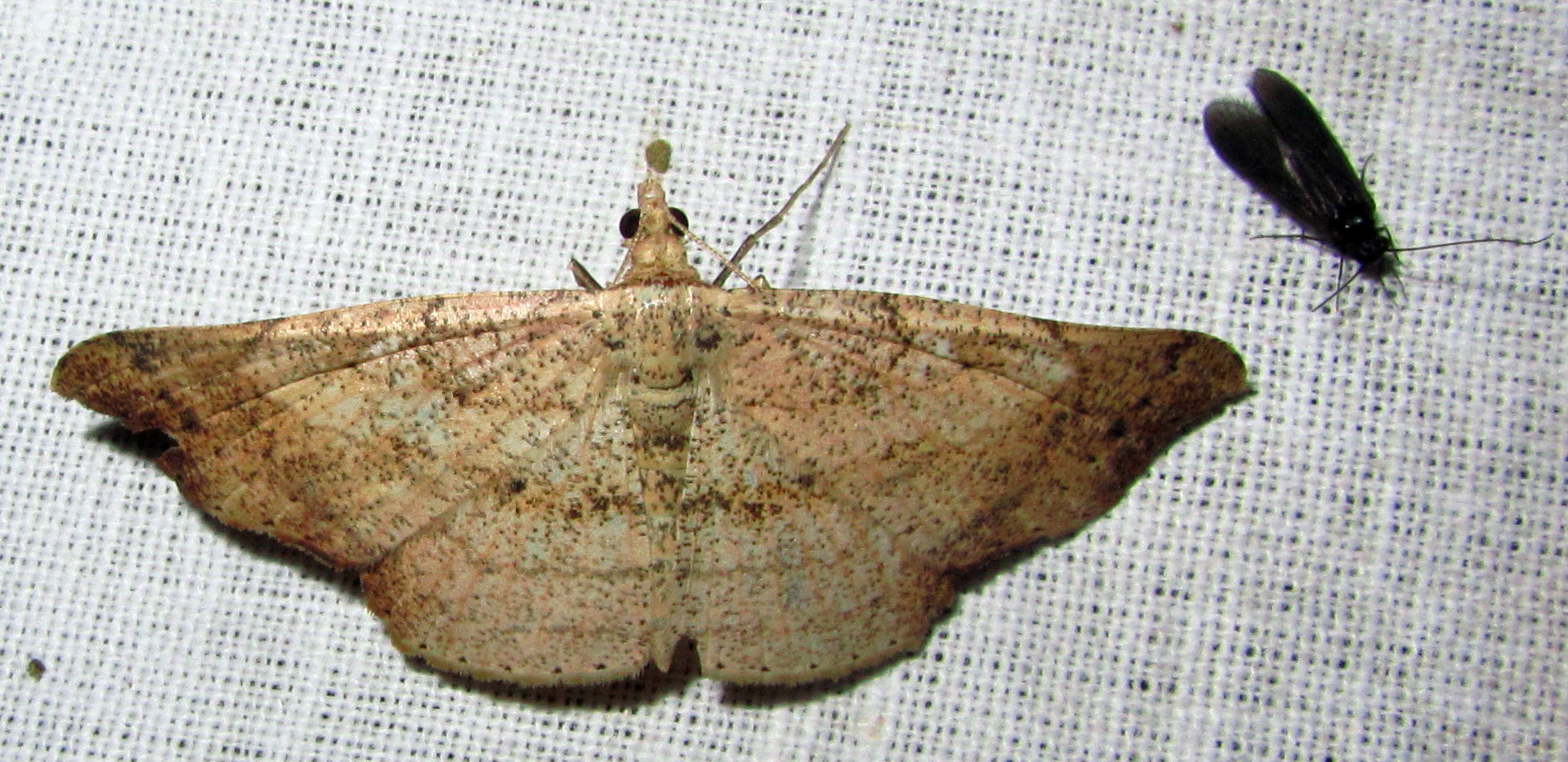

Scientific classification
- Kingdom: Animalia
- Phylum: Arthropoda
- Clade: Pancrustacea
- Class: Insecta
- Order: Lepidoptera
- Family: Geometridae
- Genus: Ozola
- Species: O. minor

Binomial name
- Ozola minor (Moore, 1888)

Synonyms
- Zarmigethusa minor Moore, 1888; Ozola leptogonia Hampson, 1902

= Ozola minor =

Species of moth

Ozola minor is a moth of the family Geometridae first described by Frederic Moore in 1888. It is found in Sri Lanka, India, the Andaman Islands, Sumatra, Borneo, the Philippines and Sulawesi.

Its wings are straw coloured. A semicircular dark zone can be seen between the forewing apex and the central angle. Host plants include Gmelina arborea and Premna species.
