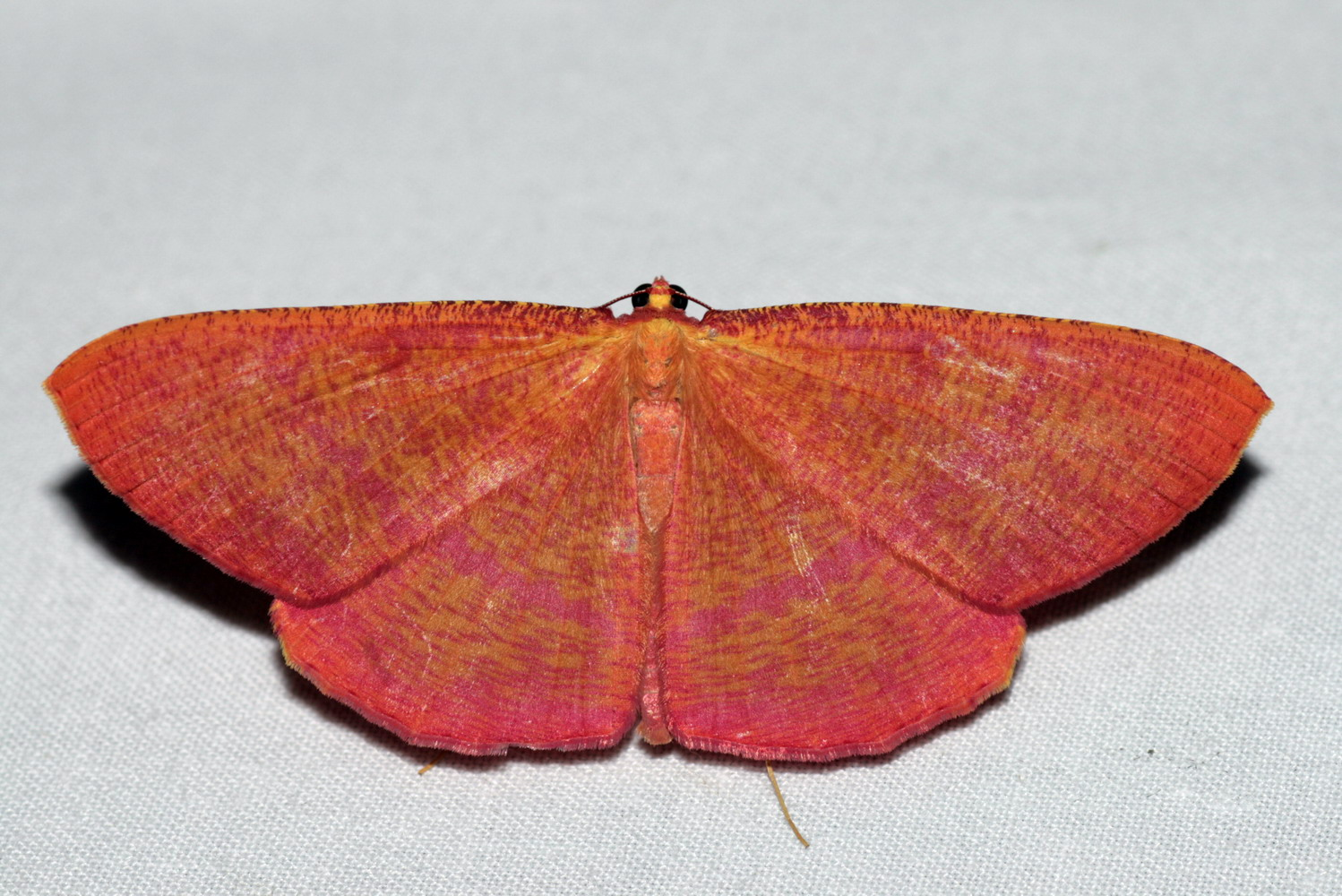
- Male

Scientific classification
- Domain: Eukaryota
- Kingdom: Animalia
- Phylum: Arthropoda
- Class: Insecta
- Order: Lepidoptera
- Family: Geometridae
- Genus: Eumelea
- Species: E. rosalia

Binomial name
- Eumelea rosalia (Stoll, [1781])

Synonyms
- Phalaena rosalia Stoll, 1781; Phalaena vulpenaria Stoll, 1782; Phalaena gravidata Fabricius, 1794; Ametris punicearia Hübner, 1825; Eumelea flavata Moore, 1887; Eumelea olivacea Hampson, 1891; Eumelea degener Warren, 1894; Eumelea sanguinata Warren, 1895; Eumelea sangirensis Warren, 1896; Eumelea sanguinata australiensis Warren, 1897; Eumelea aurigenaria Warren, 1899; Eumelea rosalia attenuata Prout, 1921; Eumelea rosalia ditona Prout, 1927; Eumelea rosalia cacuminis Prout, 1931

= Eumelea rosalia =

Species of moth

Eumelea rosalia is a species of moth of the family Geometridae described by Caspar Stoll in 1781. It is found from the Indo-Australian tropics of India, Sri Lanka, Myanmar, east to northern Australia and New Caledonia.

== Description ==
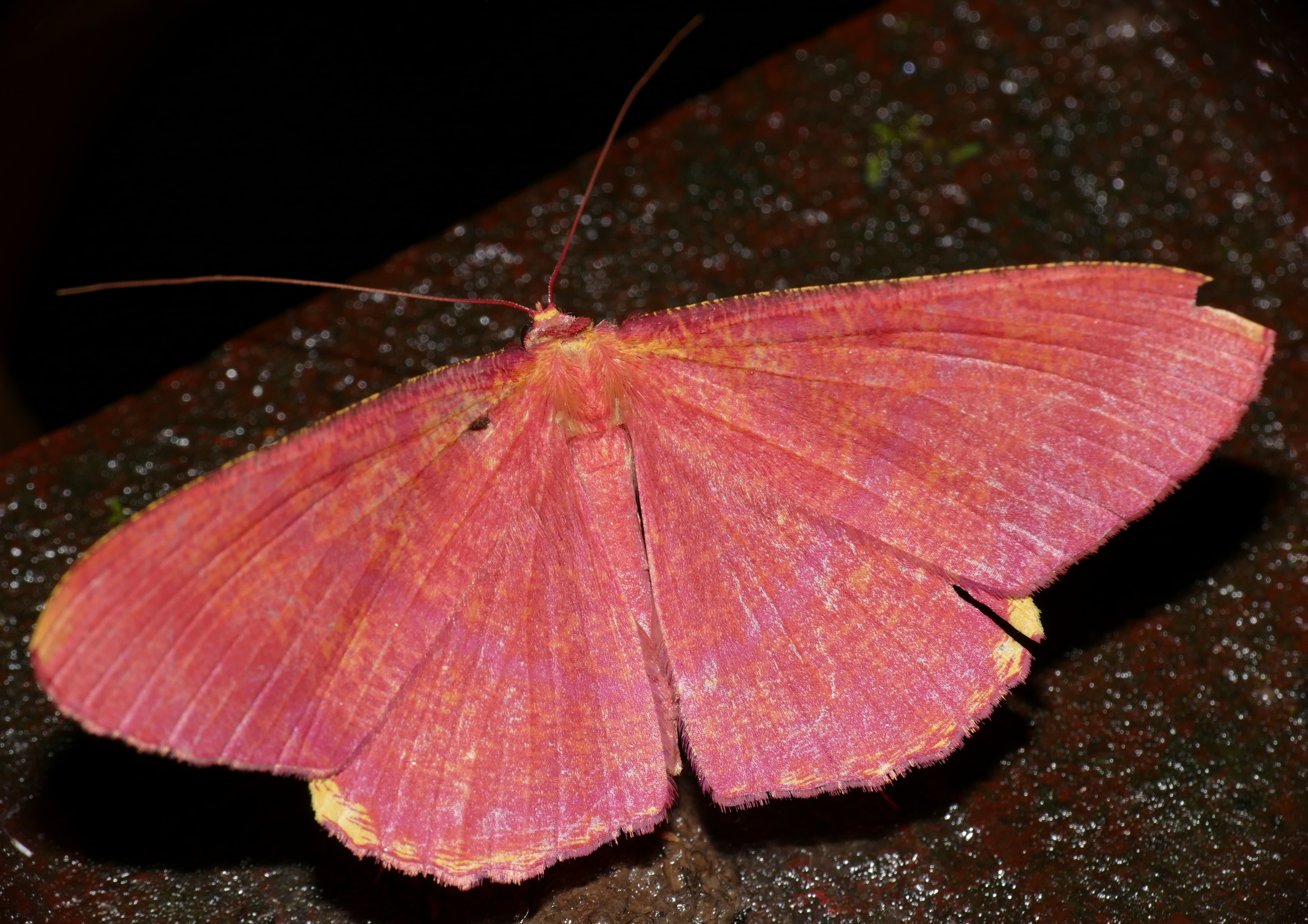

The males are generally rather redder than the females. The wingspan of the male is about 50 mm and the female 60 mm. Body bright yellow thickly irrorated with crimson. Forewings with indistinct antemedial, medial and submarginal crimson bands. Hindwings with medial and submarginal bands. Ventral side is with more prominent crimson bands.

Larvae have been recorded on Mallotus and Clinostigma species.
