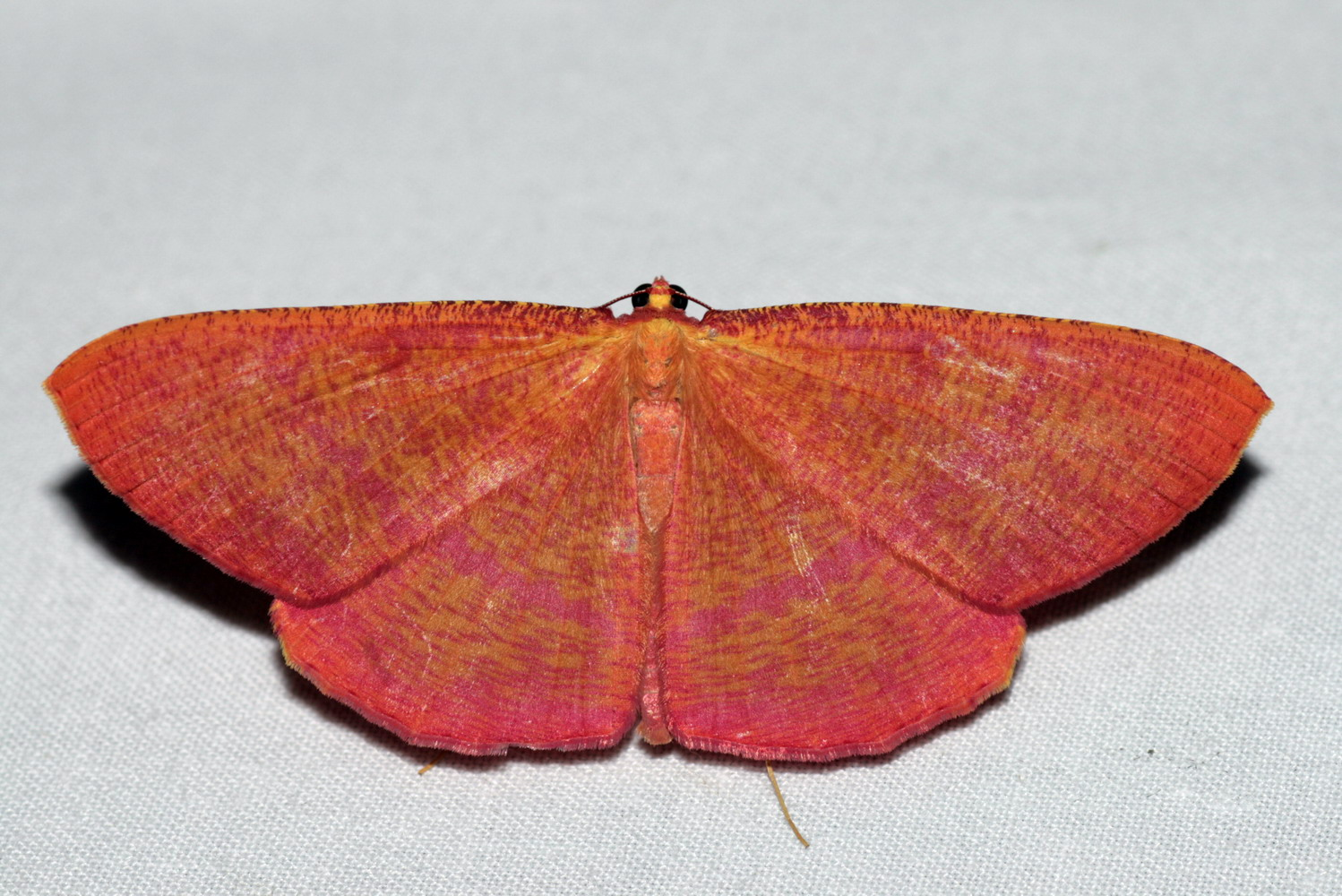
- Eumelea rosalia

Scientific classification
- Kingdom: Animalia
- Phylum: Arthropoda
- Class: Insecta
- Order: Lepidoptera
- Family: Geometridae
- Subfamily: Desmobathrinae
- Genus: Eumelea; Duncan [& Westwood], 1841

= Eumelea =

Genus of moths

Eumelea is a genus of moths in the family Geometridae. It was described by James Duncan and John O. Westwood in 1841. Species are confined to Austro-Malayan subregions and throughout China, India, Sri Lanka and Myanmar.

== Description ==
Palpi upturned, the second joint thickly scaled and third joint porrect (extended forward) and naked. Antennae very long and slender. Legs long and slender. Hind tibia fringed with hair. Forewings with vein 3 from before angle of cell. Vein 7 to 9 stalked from upper angle and vein 11 anastomosing (fusing) with vein 12 and then with vein 10. Hindwings with vein 3 from before angle of cell and vein 5 from middle of discocellulars. Vein 6, 7 stalked.

== Species ==
- Eumelea biflavata Warren, 1896
- Eumelea djingga Sommerer, 1995
- Eumelea duponchelii (Montrouzier, 1856)
- Eumelea feliciata Guenée, 1857
- Eumelea florinata Guenée, 1857
- Eumelea genuina Kirsch 1877
- Eumelea ludovicata Guenée, 1857
- Eumelea obesata Felder & Rogenhofer, 1875
- Eumelea parda Sommerer, 1995
- Eumelea rosalia (Stoll, [1781])
- Eumelea rubrifusa Warren, 1896
- Eumelea stipata Turner, 1930
- Eumelea unilineata Warren, 1897
