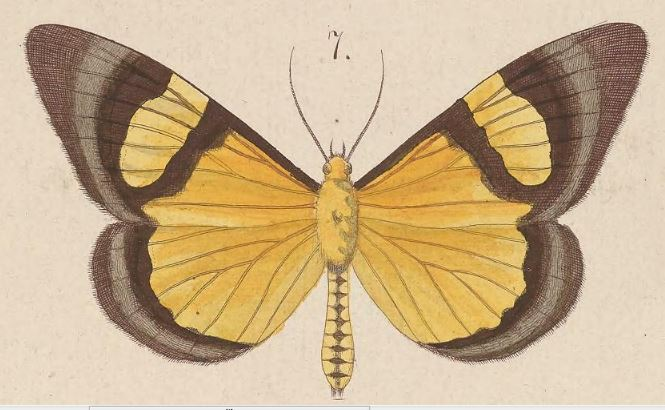

Scientific classification
- Kingdom: Animalia
- Phylum: Arthropoda
- Clade: Pancrustacea
- Class: Insecta
- Order: Lepidoptera
- Family: Geometridae
- Genus: Celerena
- Species: C. mutata

Binomial name
- Celerena mutata Walker 1865

Synonyms
- Celerena eucnemis Felder & Rogenhofer 1875

= Celerena mutata =

Species of moth

Celerena mutata is a moth of the family Geometridae first described by Francis Walker in 1865. It is found in New Guinea.
