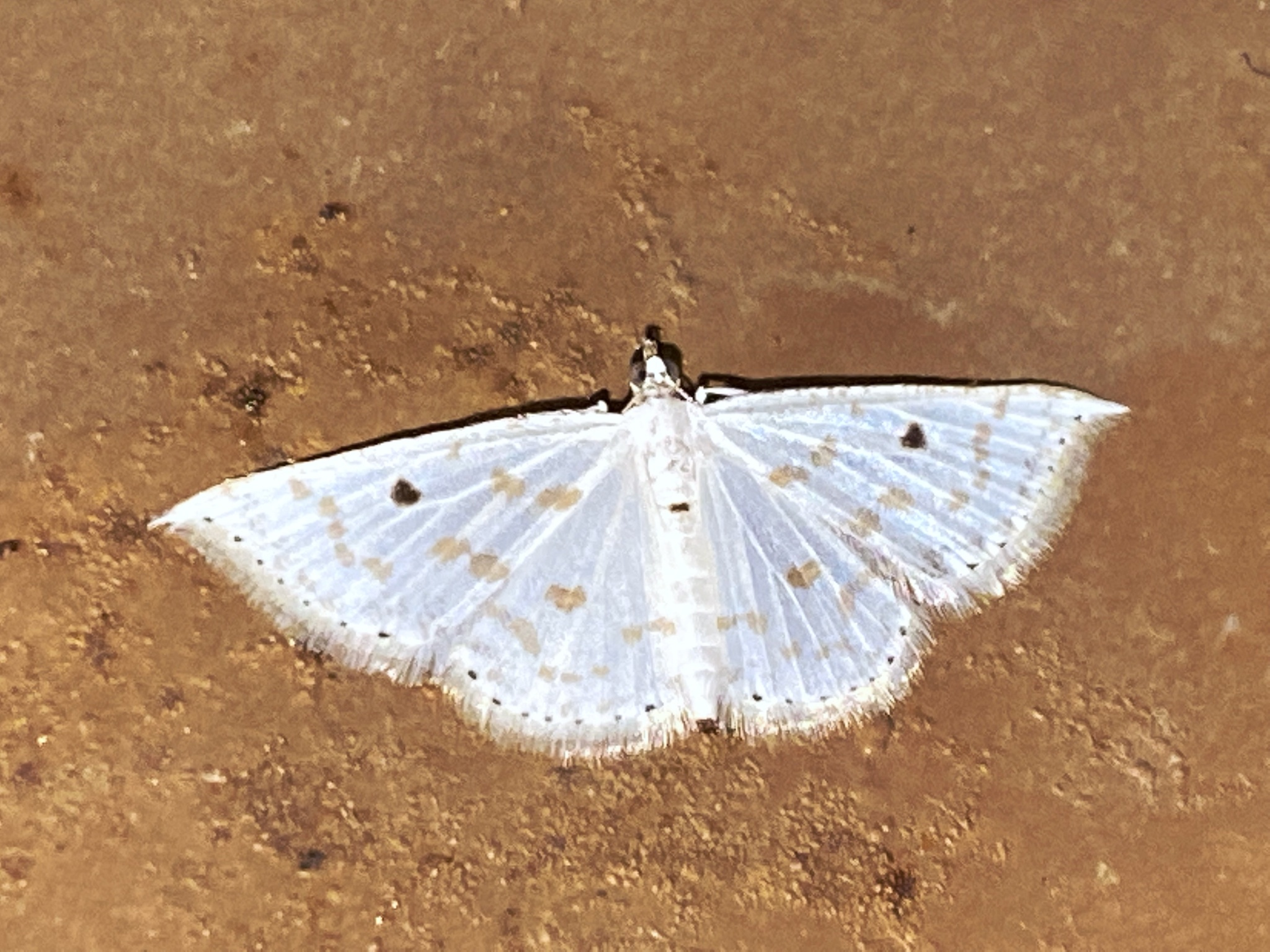

Scientific classification
- Kingdom: Animalia
- Phylum: Arthropoda
- Clade: Pancrustacea
- Class: Insecta
- Order: Lepidoptera
- Family: Geometridae
- Genus: Derambila
- Species: D. lumenaria

Binomial name
- Derambila lumenaria (Geyer, 1837)

Synonyms
- Arrhostia lumenaria Geyer 1837; Rambara ochreicostalis Hampson, 1893; Derambila lumenaria D. S. Fletcher, 1979

= Derambila lumenaria =

Species of moth

Derambila lumenaria is a moth of the family Geometridae described by Carl Geyer in 1837. It is found in Sri Lanka, India and Sundaland.

Prominent black dots are found along the wing margins.
