= Antozola =

Scientific classification
- Kingdom: Animalia
- Phylum: Arthropoda
- Class: Insecta
- Order: Lepidoptera
- Family: Geometridae
- Subfamily: Desmobathrinae
- Genus: Antozola; Herbulot

Genus of geometer moths

Antozola is a genus of moths in the family Geometridae. It was described by Claude Herbulot in 1992.
