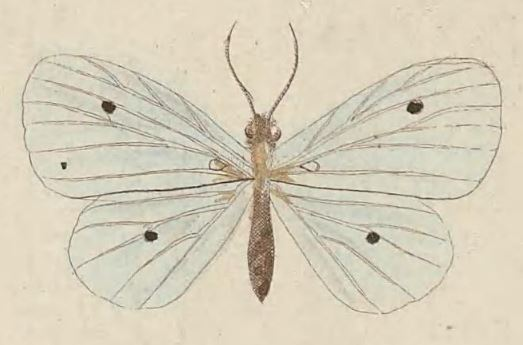

Scientific classification
- Kingdom: Animalia
- Phylum: Arthropoda
- Clade: Pancrustacea
- Class: Insecta
- Order: Lepidoptera
- Family: Geometridae
- Genus: Derxena
- Species: D. nivea

Binomial name
- Derxena nivea (Kirsch, 1877)

Synonyms
- Acidalia nivea Kirsch, 1877

= Derxena nivea =

Species of moth

Derxena nivea is a moth of the family Geometridae first described by Theodor Franz Wilhelm Kirsch in 1877. It is found in New Guinea.
