= Noreia ajaia =

Scientific classification
- Kingdom: Animalia
- Phylum: Arthropoda
- Clade: Pancrustacea
- Class: Insecta
- Order: Lepidoptera
- Family: Geometridae
- Genus: Noreia
- Species: N. ajaia

Binomial name
- Noreia ajaia (Walker, 1859)

Synonyms
- Panulia ajaia Walker, 1859; Timandra ajaia Walker, 1859; Noreia perdensata Walker, 1862

Species of moth

Noreia ajaia is a moth of the family Geometridae first described by Francis Walker in 1859. Its geographical range includes areas from the Oriental regions of India and Sri Lanka to Singapore and Sundaland.

The adult has brownish-grey wings. In the hindwings, the postmedial is distinctly rounded. The caterpillar greenish with a long, thin, cylindrical body. It rests at 45 degrees with a stick-like posture. Host plants include Mimusops species.
