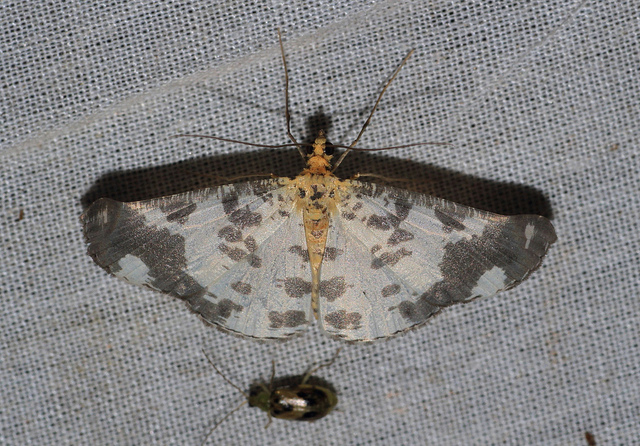
- Ozola liwana

Scientific classification
- Kingdom: Animalia
- Phylum: Arthropoda
- Class: Insecta
- Order: Lepidoptera
- Family: Geometridae
- Subfamily: Desmobathrinae
- Genus: Ozola; Walker, 1861

Type species
- Ozola microniaria Walker, 1862

Synonyms
- Carima Walker, 1862; Desmobathra Meyrick, 1886; Tosaura Swinhoe, 1892; Zarmigethusa Walker, 1863

= Ozola =

Genus of moths

Ozola is a genus of moths in the family Geometridae first described by Francis Walker in 1861.

== Description ==
Palpi porrect (extending forward), clothed with hair and reaching beyond the frons. Antennae of male ciliated. Abdomen and legs are long and slender. Hind tibia dilated with a fold containing a hair tuft. Forewings long and narrow, with a round apex. Vein 3 from before angle of cell and veins 7 to 9 stalked from before upper angle. Vein 10 absent, whereas vein 11 anastomosing with vein 12 and then with veins 8 and 9. Hindwings with vein 3 from before angle of cell and vein 5 from just above middle of discocellulars. Veins 6 and 7 from upper angle.

== Species ==
- Ozola apparata (Prout, 1928) – from Sumatra, Java and Borneo
- Ozola basisparsata (Walker, [1863]) – from Borneo, Engano, Palawan, and Philippines
- Ozola biangulifera (Moore, 1888) – from Himalaya
- Ozola concreta (Prout, 1931) – from Malaysia
- Ozola defectata (Inoue, 1971) – from Japan
- Ozola extersaria (Walker, 1861) – from India
- Ozola edui (Sommerer, 1995) – from Sumatra, Singapore, and Borneo
- Ozola exigua (Swinhoe, 1902) – from Queensland)
- Ozola falcipennis (Moore, 1888) – from Himalaya, Peninsular Malaysia, and Borneo
- Ozola hollowayi (Scoble & Sommerer, 1988) – from Sumatra, Nias, Borneo, Philippines, Sulawesi, Lesser Sundas, South Moluccas, New Guinea, Bismarck Islands, and Queensland
- Ozola indefensa (Warren, 1899) – from New Guinea
- Ozola inexcisata (Fryer, 1912) – from the Seychelles
- Ozola intransilis (Prout, 1928) – from Sumatra and Java
- Ozola impedita (Walker, 1861) – from Borneo
- Ozola japonica (Prout, 1910) – from Japan
- Ozola liwana (Sommerer, 1995) – from Sumatra and Borneo
- Ozola macariata (Walker, [1863]) – from Moluccas and Sulawesi
- Ozola microniaria (Walker, 1862) – from Sri Lanka
- Ozola minor (Moore, 1888) – from Sri Lanka, India, Andamans, Sumatra, Borneo, Philippines, and Sulawesi
- Ozola minuta (Wiltshire, 1990) – from Yemen and Saudi Arabia
- Ozola niphoplaca (Meyrick, 1886) – from Solomons
- Ozola occidentalis (Prout, 1916) – from Cameroon
- Ozola pannosa (Holloway, 1976) – from Borneo and Sumatra
- Ozola plana (Warren, 1894) – from the Loyalty islands
- Ozola prouti (Holloway, 1976) – from Borneo
- Ozola pulverulenta (Warren, 1897) – southern Africa
- Ozola sinuicosta (Prout, 1910) – from Himalaya
- Ozola submontana (Holloway, 1976) – from Borneo
- Ozola spilotis (Meyrick, 1897) – from Java, Sumatra, and Sumbawa
- Ozola turlini (Herbulot, 1985) – from Sundaland and Sulawesi
