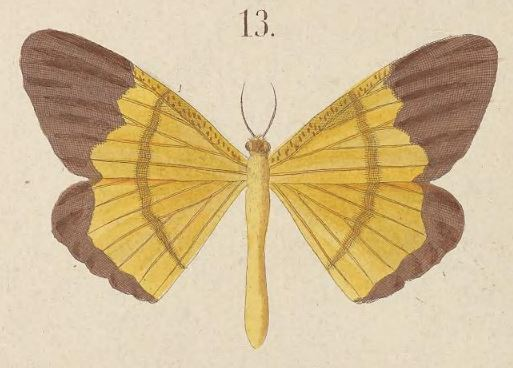

Scientific classification
- Domain: Eukaryota
- Kingdom: Animalia
- Phylum: Arthropoda
- Class: Insecta
- Order: Lepidoptera
- Family: Geometridae
- Genus: Eumelea
- Species: E. genuina

Binomial name
- Eumelea genuina Kirsch, 1877

Synonyms
- Eumelea craspedias Meyrick 1886

= Eumelea genuina =

Species of moth

Eumelea genuina is a species of moth of the family Geometridae first described by Theodor Franz Wilhelm Kirsch in 1877. It is found in Papua New Guinea.
