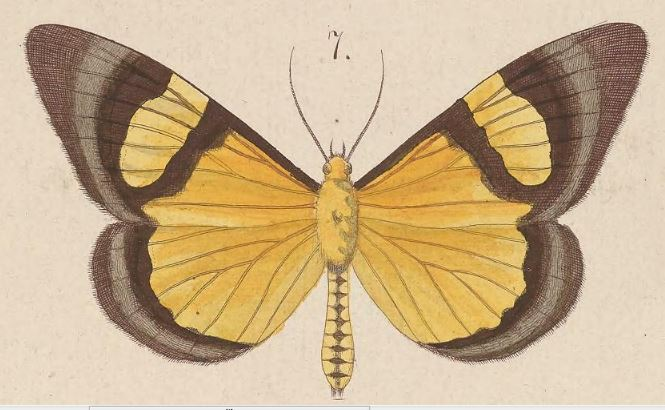
- Celerena mutata

Scientific classification
- Kingdom: Animalia
- Phylum: Arthropoda
- Class: Insecta
- Order: Lepidoptera
- Family: Geometridae
- Subfamily: Desmobathrinae
- Genus: Celerena; Walker, 1862

Synonyms
- Bociraza Walker, 1865

= Celerena =

Genus of moths

Celerena is a genus of moths in the family Geometridae.

== Species ==
- Celerena andamana Felder & Rogenhofer
- Celerena divisa (Walker, 1862)
- Celerena griseofusa Warren, 1896
- Celerena lerne (Boisduval, 1832)
- Celerena mutata Walker, [1865]
- Celerena pallidicolor Warren, 1894
- Celerena perithea (Cramer, [1777])
- Celerena recurvata (Walker, [1865])
- Celerena signata Warren, 1898
- Celerena stenospila Warren, 1894
