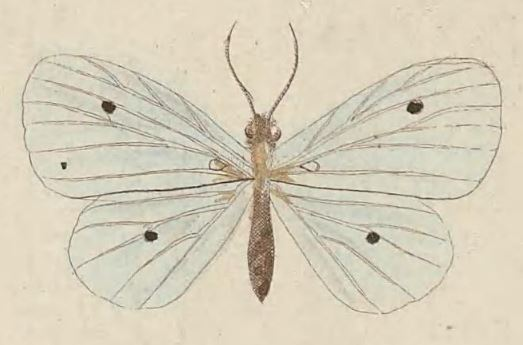

Scientific classification
- Kingdom: Animalia
- Phylum: Arthropoda
- Class: Insecta
- Order: Lepidoptera
- Family: Geometridae
- Subfamily: Desmobathrinae
- Genus: Derxena; Walker, 1866

= Derxena =

Genus of moths

Derxena is a genus of moths in the family Geometridae.

== Species ==
- Derxena coelivagata Walker, 1866
- Derxena nivea (Kirsch, 1877)
