= Panagropsis =

Scientific classification
- Kingdom: Animalia
- Phylum: Arthropoda
- Class: Insecta
- Order: Lepidoptera
- Family: Geometridae
- Genus: Panagropsis; Warren, 1894
- Species: P. equitaria

Binomial name
- Panagropsis equitaria (Walker, 1861)

Genus of moths

Panagropsis is a monotypic moth genus in the family Geometridae described by Warren in 1894. Its only species, Panagropsis equitaria, described by Francis Walker in 1861, is found in South Africa.
