= Foveabathra =

Scientific classification
- Kingdom: Animalia
- Phylum: Arthropoda
- Clade: Pancrustacea
- Class: Insecta
- Order: Lepidoptera
- Family: Geometridae
- Genus: Foveabathra; Holloway, 1996
- Species: F. venusta

Binomial name
- Foveabathra venusta (Warren, 1899)

Genus of moths

Foveabathra is a monotypic moth genus in the family Geometridae erected by Jeremy Daniel Holloway in 1996. Its only species, Foveabathra venusta, described by Warren in 1899, is found in Borneo, Peninsular Malaysia and Sumatra.
