= Leptoctenopsis =

Scientific classification
- Kingdom: Animalia
- Phylum: Arthropoda
- Class: Insecta
- Order: Lepidoptera
- Family: Geometridae
- Genus: Leptoctenopsis; Warren, 1895

Synonyms
- Parachoreutes Warren, 1897

Genus of moths

Leptoctenopsis is a genus of moths in the family Geometridae erected by Warren in 1897.
