= Apatadelpha =

Scientific classification
- Kingdom: Animalia
- Phylum: Arthropoda
- Clade: Pancrustacea
- Class: Insecta
- Order: Lepidoptera
- Family: Geometridae
- Genus: Apatadelpha; Prout, 1910
- Species: A. biocellaria

Binomial name
- Apatadelpha biocellaria (Walker, [1863])

Synonyms
- Panagra biocellaria Walker, [1863]

Genus of geometer moths

Apatadelpha is a monotypic genus of moths in the family Geometridae containing only the species Apatadelpha biocellaria.
