= Noreia (moth) =

Scientific classification
- Kingdom: Animalia
- Phylum: Arthropoda
- Class: Insecta
- Order: Lepidoptera
- Family: Geometridae
- Genus: Noreia; Walker, 1861

Genus of moths

Noreia is a genus of moths in the family Geometridae first described by Francis Walker in 1861.

== Description ==
Palpi upturned and reaching vertex of head. Antennae of male ciliated. Hind tibia with a slight ridge of scales on inner side. Forewings with vein 3 from before angle of cell and veins 7 to 10 stalked. Vein 11 anastomosing (fusing) with vein 12, then with vein 10, which again anastomosing with veins 8 and 9. Hindwings with vein 3 from just before angle of cell, vein 7 from just before upper angle.

== Species ==
- Noreia ajaia (Walker, 1859)
- Noreia unilineata (Walker, 1866)
- Noreia achloraria (Warren, 1894)
- Noreia anacardium Holloway, 1996
- Noreia sinuilineata Holloway, 1996
- Noreia albifimbria Warren, 1897
- Noreia vinacea Warren, 1899
