= Encryphia =

Scientific classification
- Kingdom: Animalia
- Phylum: Arthropoda
- Class: Insecta
- Order: Lepidoptera
- Family: Geometridae
- Genus: Encryphia; Turner, 1904
- Species: E. frontisignata

Binomial name
- Encryphia frontisignata (Walker, [1863])

Genus of moths

Encryphia is a monotypic moth genus in the family Geometridae erected by Alfred Jefferis Turner in 1904. Its only species, Encryphia frontisignata, first described by Francis Walker in 1863, is found in Australia.
