= Brachytrita =

Scientific classification
- Kingdom: Animalia
- Phylum: Arthropoda
- Class: Insecta
- Order: Lepidoptera
- Family: Geometridae
- Genus: Brachytrita

Genus of moths

Brachytrita is a genus of moths in the family Geometridae.

== Species ==
Only one species is part of this genus:

- Brachytrita cervinaria Swinhoe, 1904 from Tanzania.
