= Monnechroma =

Scientific classification
- Domain: Eukaryota
- Kingdom: Animalia
- Phylum: Arthropoda
- Class: Insecta
- Order: Coleoptera
- Suborder: Polyphaga
- Infraorder: Cucujiformia
- Family: Cerambycidae
- Subfamily: Cerambycinae
- Tribe: Callichromatini
- Genus: Monnechroma; Napp & Martins, 2005

Type species
- Callichroma (Xenochroma) subpulvereum Schmidt, 1924

Genus of beetle

Monnechroma is a genus of beetles in the family Cerambycidae, containing the following species:

- Monnechroma azureum (Demets, 1976)
- Monnechroma hovorei (Giesbert, 1998)
- Monnechroma seabrai (Fragoso & Monné, 1989)
- Monnechroma subpulvereum (Schmidt, 1924)
- Monnechroma tibiale (Giesbert, 1987)
- Monnechroma uniforme (Gounelle, 1911)

The genus is a nomen novum for Martin Schmidt's subgenus Xenochroma (later raised to genus status); the genus Xenochroma was a senior homonym. Miguel A. Monné is the namesake of the genus Monnechroma.
