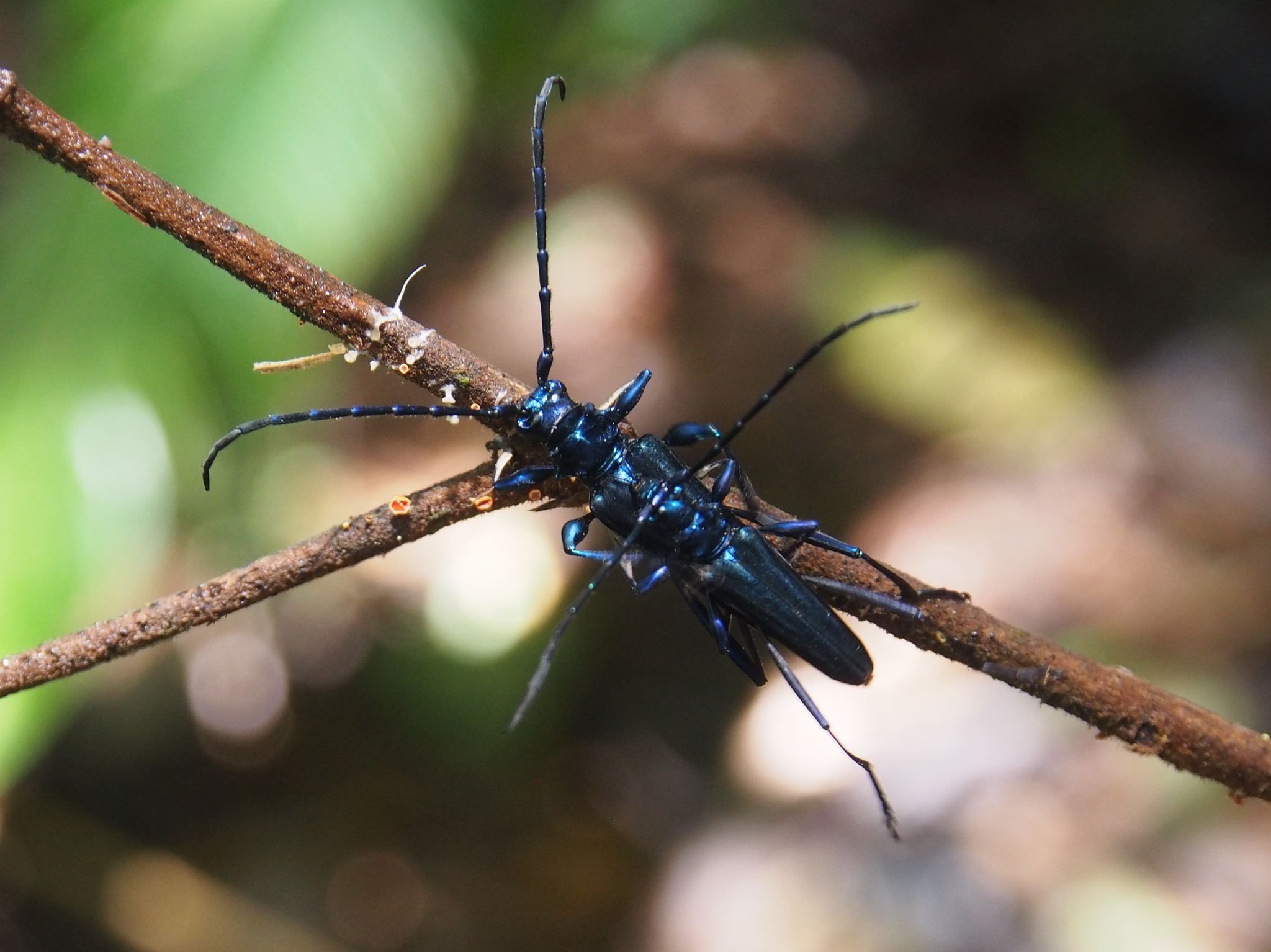
- Mating pair

Scientific classification
- Kingdom: Animalia
- Phylum: Arthropoda
- Class: Insecta
- Order: Coleoptera
- Suborder: Polyphaga
- Infraorder: Cucujiformia
- Family: Cerambycidae
- Genus: Monnechroma
- Species: M. azureum

Binomial name
- Monnechroma azureum (Demets, 1976)

Synonyms
- Xenochroma azurea Demets, 1976

= Monnechroma azureum =

Species of beetle

Monnechroma azureum is a species of beetle in the family Cerambycidae. It is known from Mexico and Costa Rica.
