= Monnechroma uniforme =

Scientific classification
- Domain: Eukaryota
- Kingdom: Animalia
- Phylum: Arthropoda
- Class: Insecta
- Order: Coleoptera
- Suborder: Polyphaga
- Infraorder: Cucujiformia
- Family: Cerambycidae
- Genus: Monnechroma
- Species: M. uniforme

Binomial name
- Monnechroma uniforme (Gounelle, 1911)

Synonyms
- Monnechroma schmidti (Melzer, 1926)

Species of beetle

Monnechroma uniforme is a species of beetle in the family Cerambycidae. It was described by Gounelle in 1911. It is known from southeastern Brazil.
