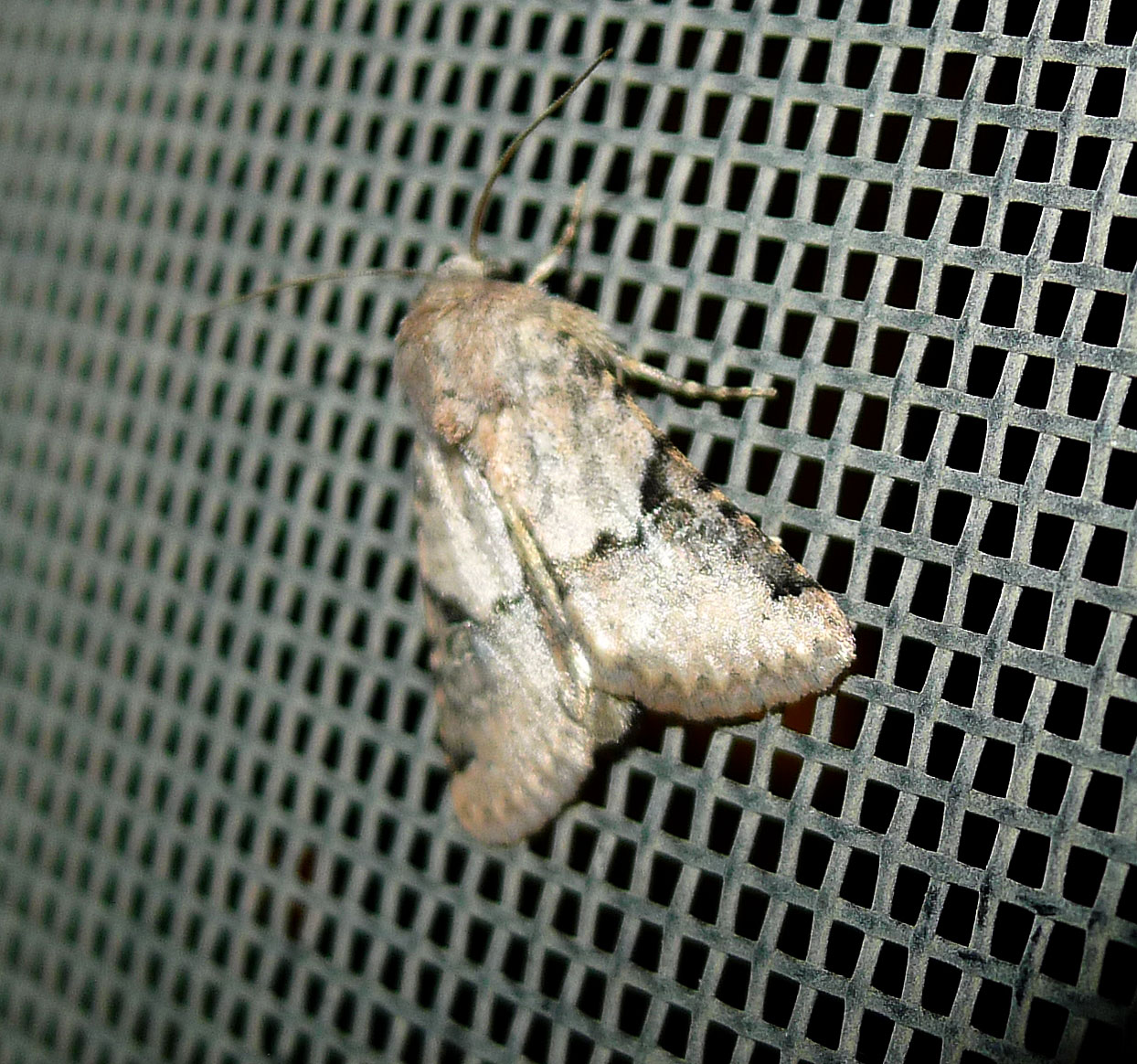

Scientific classification
- Kingdom: Animalia
- Phylum: Arthropoda
- Clade: Pancrustacea
- Class: Insecta
- Order: Lepidoptera
- Family: Geometridae
- Genus: Vinemina
- Species: V. opacaria

Binomial name
- Vinemina opacaria (Hulst, 1881)

Synonyms
- Vinemina opacaria nigaria Cassino, 1928

= Vinemina opacaria =

Species of moth

Vinemina opacaria is a species of geometrid moth in the family Geometridae. It is found in North America.
