= Monnechroma tibiale =

Scientific classification
- Kingdom: Animalia
- Phylum: Arthropoda
- Class: Insecta
- Order: Coleoptera
- Suborder: Polyphaga
- Infraorder: Cucujiformia
- Family: Cerambycidae
- Genus: Monnechroma
- Species: M. tibiale

Binomial name
- Monnechroma tibiale (Giesbert, 1987)

Synonyms
- Xenochroma tibialis Giesbert, 1987

Species of beetle

Monnechroma tibiale is a species of beetle in the family Cerambycidae. It was described by Giesbert in 1987. It is known from Costa Rica.
