= Monnechroma seabrai =

Scientific classification
- Domain: Eukaryota
- Kingdom: Animalia
- Phylum: Arthropoda
- Class: Insecta
- Order: Coleoptera
- Suborder: Polyphaga
- Infraorder: Cucujiformia
- Family: Cerambycidae
- Genus: Monnechroma
- Species: M. seabrai

Binomial name
- Monnechroma seabrai (Fragoso & Monné, 1989)

Synonyms
- Xenochroma seabrai Fragoso & Monné, 1989

Species of beetle

Monnechroma seabrai is a species of beetle in the family Cerambycidae. It was described by S. A. Fragoso and Miguel A. Monné in 1989. It is known from southeastern Brazil.
