= Monnechroma hovorei =

Scientific classification
- Domain: Eukaryota
- Kingdom: Animalia
- Phylum: Arthropoda
- Class: Insecta
- Order: Coleoptera
- Suborder: Polyphaga
- Infraorder: Cucujiformia
- Family: Cerambycidae
- Genus: Monnechroma
- Species: M. hovorei

Binomial name
- Monnechroma hovorei (Giesbert, 1998)

Species of beetle

Monnechroma hovorei is a species of beetle in the family Cerambycidae. It was described by Giesbert in 1998. It is known from Costa Rica.
