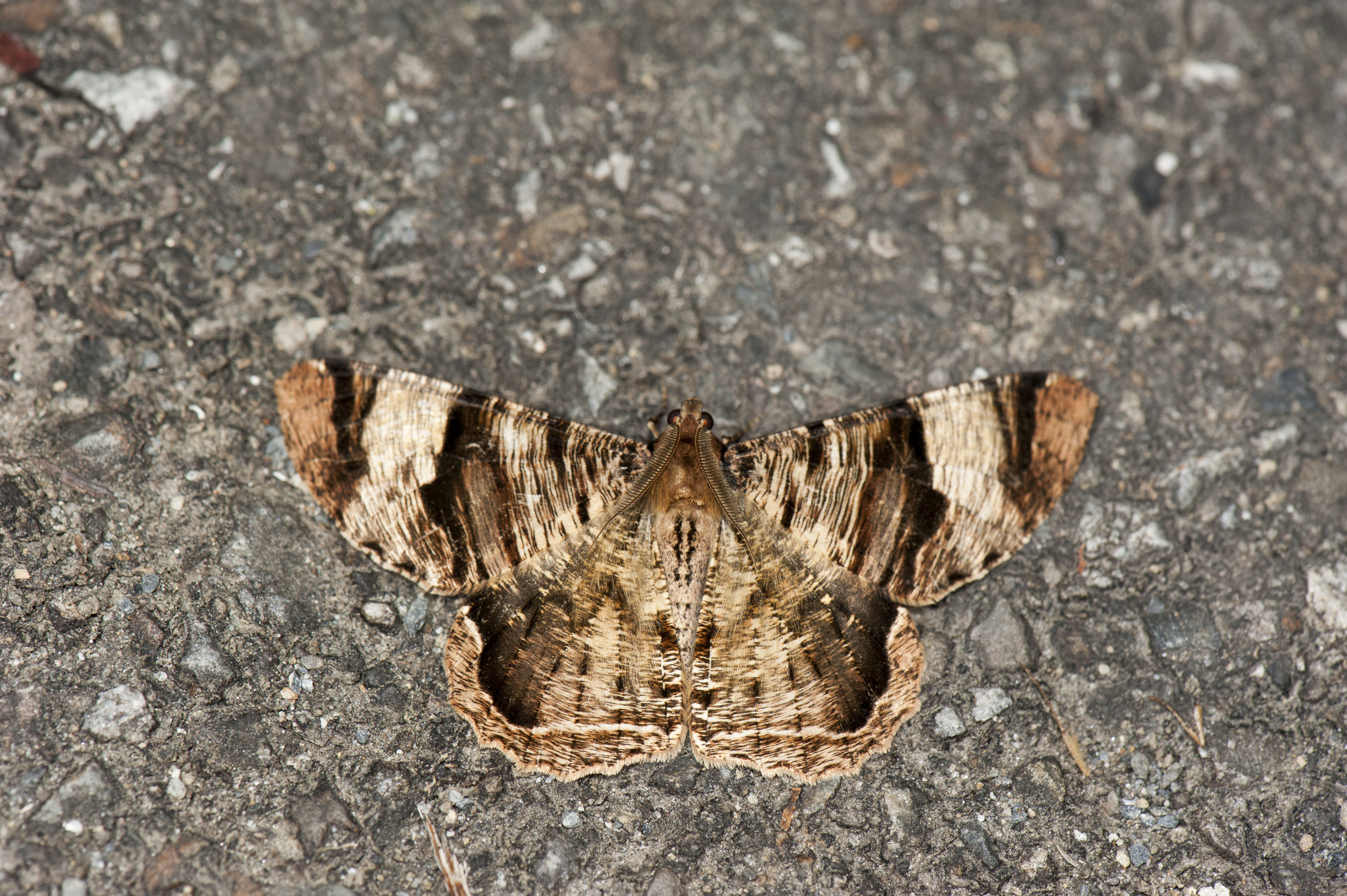

Scientific classification
- Kingdom: Animalia
- Phylum: Arthropoda
- Class: Insecta
- Order: Lepidoptera
- Family: Geometridae
- Genus: Xandrames
- Species: X. latiferaria

Binomial name
- Xandrames latiferaria (Walker, 1860)

Synonyms
- Pachyodes latiferaria Walker, 1860; Xandrames curvistriga Warren, 1894; Xandrames cnecozona Prout, 1926; Xandrames latiferaria mulsa Prout, 1935; Xandrames latiferaria recondita Inoue, 1982

= Xandrames latiferaria =

Species of moth

Xandrames latiferaria is a moth of the family Geometridae first described by Francis Walker in 1860. It is found in Japan, China, the north-eastern parts of the Himalayas and Sundaland.

In genitalia and facies Xandrames cnecozona resembles typical X. latiferaria but is slightly larger and yellower. It is considered a synonym but might merit subspecific status.

The wingspan is 50–60 mm.

The larvae feed on Lindera species.

== Subspecies ==
- Xandrames latiferaria latiferaria
- Xandrames latiferaria recondita
- Xandrames latiferaria curvistriga
- Xandrames latiferaria mulsa
