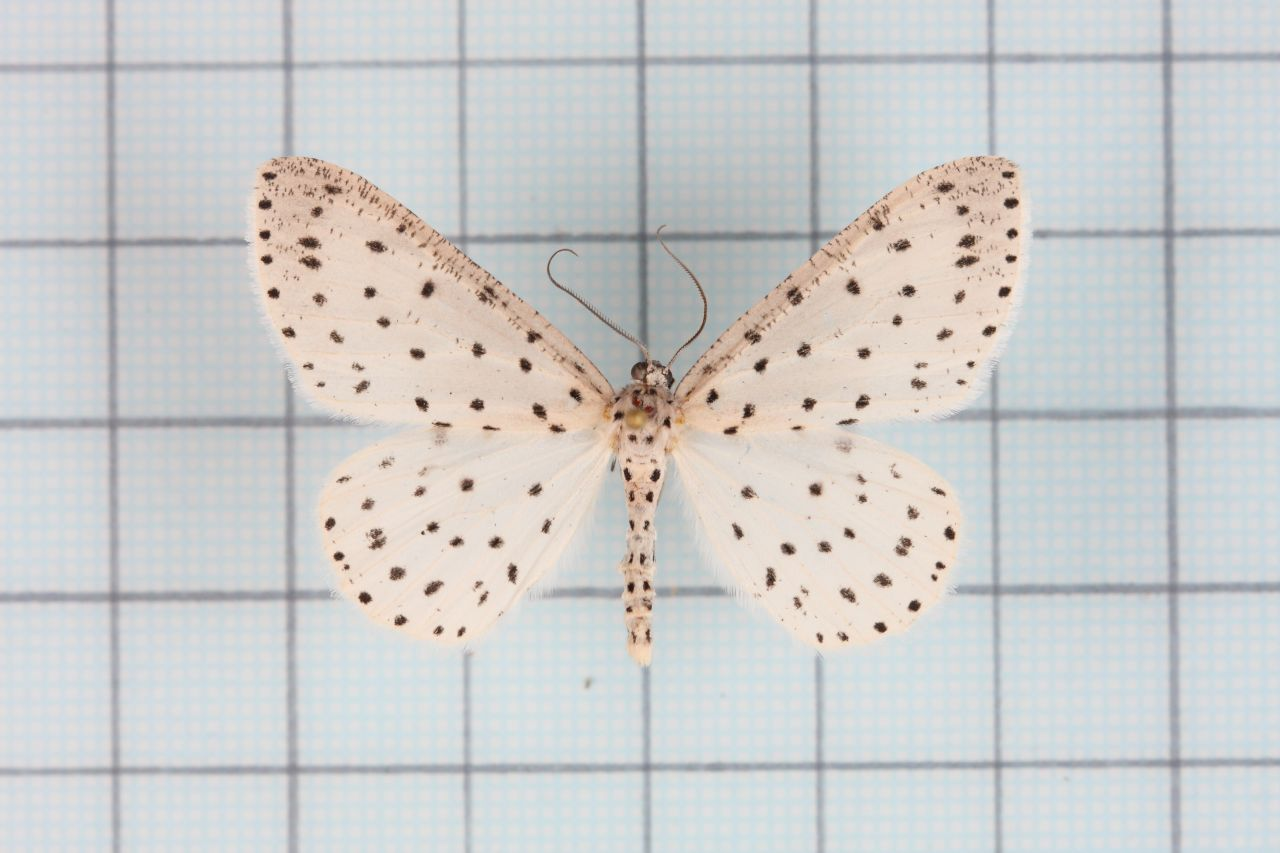

Scientific classification
- Kingdom: Animalia
- Phylum: Arthropoda
- Class: Insecta
- Order: Lepidoptera
- Family: Geometridae
- Genus: Xenoplia
- Species: X. trivialis

Binomial name
- Xenoplia trivialis (Yazaki, 1987)

Synonyms
- Percnia trivialis Yazaki, 1987

= Xenoplia trivialis =

Species of moth

Xenoplia trivialis is a species of moth of the family Geometridae first described by Yazaki in 1987. It is found in Taiwan.
