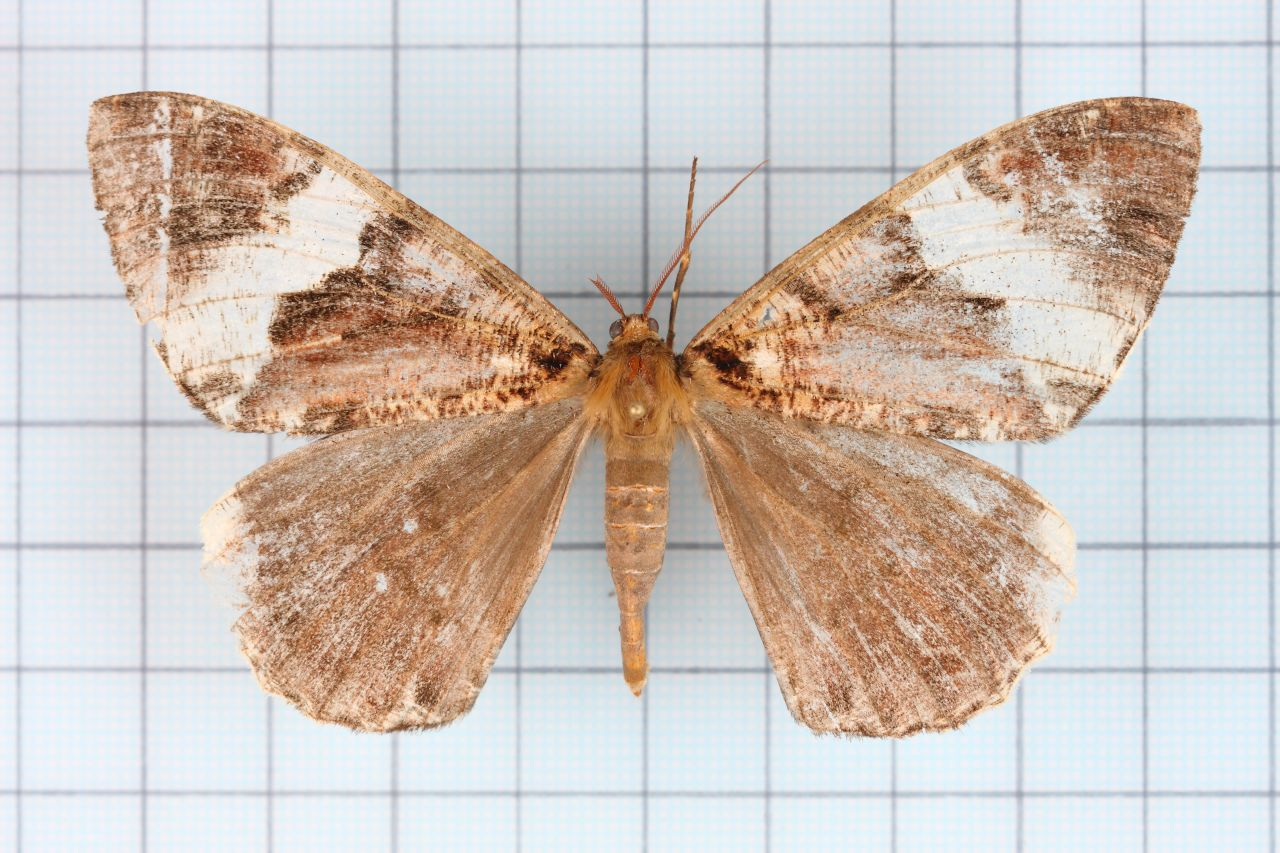

Scientific classification
- Kingdom: Animalia
- Phylum: Arthropoda
- Class: Insecta
- Order: Lepidoptera
- Family: Geometridae
- Genus: Xandrames
- Species: X. dholaria

Binomial name
- Xandrames dholaria Moore, 1868

Synonyms
- Xandrames sericea Butler, 1881

= Xandrames dholaria =

Species of moth

Xandrames dholaria is a moth of the family Geometridae first described by Frederic Moore in 1868. It is found in China, Japan and Taiwan.
