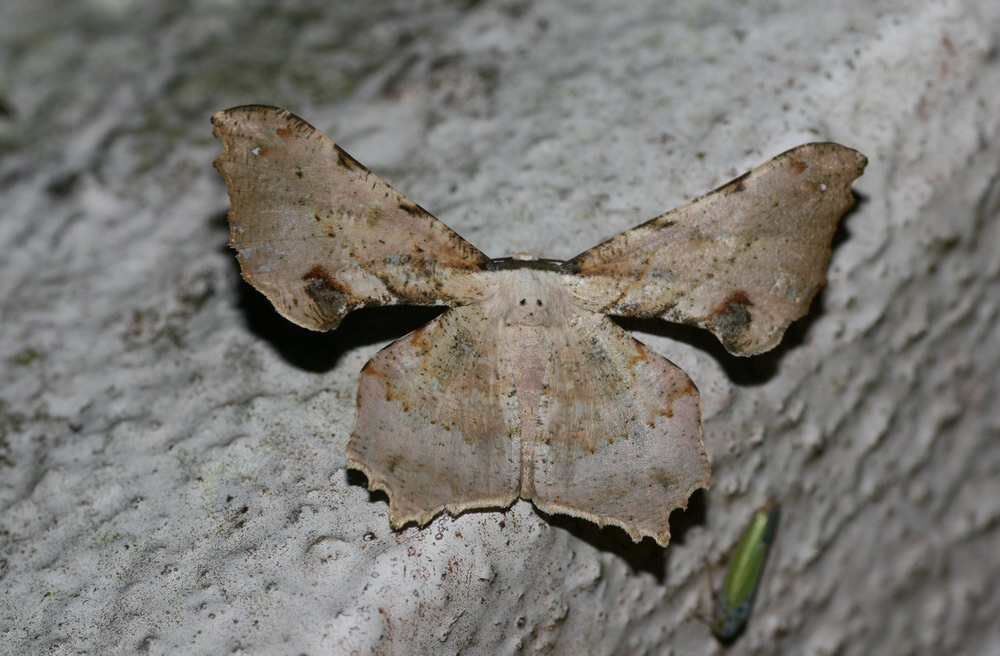

Scientific classification
- Domain: Eukaryota
- Kingdom: Animalia
- Phylum: Arthropoda
- Class: Insecta
- Order: Lepidoptera
- Family: Geometridae
- Genus: Xylinophylla
- Species: X. hypocausta

Binomial name
- Xylinophylla hypocausta (Warren, 1897)

Synonyms
- Adelphocrasta hypocausta Warren, 1899

= Xylinophylla hypocausta =

Species of moth

Xylinophylla hypocausta is a moth of the family Geometridae first described by William Warren in 1897. It is found in Peninsular Malaysia, Singapore, Sumatra and Borneo.

The species has been treated as a subspecies of Xylinophylla maculata for some time.

The larvae feed on Aleurites moluccanus.
