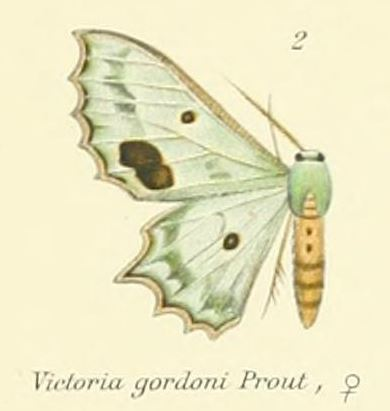

Scientific classification
- Domain: Eukaryota
- Kingdom: Animalia
- Phylum: Arthropoda
- Class: Insecta
- Order: Lepidoptera
- Family: Geometridae
- Genus: Victoria
- Species: V. gordoni

Binomial name
- Victoria gordoni L. B. Prout, 1912

= Victoria gordoni =

Species of moth

Victoria gordoni is a species of moth in the family Geometridae first described by Louis Beethoven Prout in 1912. It is known from Angola, Ivory Coast, Nigeria, Cameroon and Kenya.
