= Xanthodura hypocrypta =

Scientific classification
- Kingdom: Animalia
- Phylum: Arthropoda
- Class: Insecta
- Order: Lepidoptera
- Family: Geometridae
- Genus: Xanthodura
- Species: X. hypocrypta

Binomial name
- Xanthodura hypocrypta Prout, 1925

Species of moth

Xanthodura hypocrypta is a species of moth in the family Geometridae first described by Louis Beethoven Prout in 1925. It is found in central Madagascar.
