= Xenimpia lactesignata =

Scientific classification
- Domain: Eukaryota
- Kingdom: Animalia
- Phylum: Arthropoda
- Class: Insecta
- Order: Lepidoptera
- Family: Geometridae
- Genus: Xenimpia
- Species: X. lactesignata

Binomial name
- Xenimpia lactesignata (Warren, 1914)

Synonyms
- Procypha lactesignata Warren,1914

Species of moth

Xenimpia lactesignata is a moth of the family Geometridae first described by William Warren in 1914.

== Distribution ==
It is known from South Africa.
