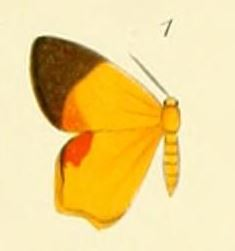

Scientific classification
- Kingdom: Animalia
- Phylum: Arthropoda
- Class: Insecta
- Order: Lepidoptera
- Family: Geometridae
- Genus: Xanthodura
- Species: X. trucidata

Binomial name
- Xanthodura trucidata Butler, 1880

= Xanthodura trucidata =

Species of moth

Xanthodura trucidata is a species of moth in the family Geometridae first described by Arthur Gardiner Butler in 1880. It is known from Madagascar.
