= Monnechroma subpulvereum =

Scientific classification
- Domain: Eukaryota
- Kingdom: Animalia
- Phylum: Arthropoda
- Class: Insecta
- Order: Coleoptera
- Suborder: Polyphaga
- Infraorder: Cucujiformia
- Family: Cerambycidae
- Genus: Monnechroma
- Species: M. subpulvereum

Binomial name
- Monnechroma subpulvereum (Schmidt, 1924)

Synonyms
- Callichroma (Xenochroma) subpulvereum Schmidt, 1924; Xenochroma subpulvereum (Schmidt, 1924) Podany, 1965; Monnechroma subpulvereum (Schmidt, 1924) Napp & Martins, 2005; Callichroma (Xenochroma) subcomosum Schmidt, 1924; Xenochroma subcomosum (Schmidt, 1924) Podany, 1965; Callichroma (Xenochroma) difficilis Schwarzer, 1929; Xenochroma difficilis (Schwarzer, 1929) Podany, 1965

Species of beetle

Monnechroma subpulvereum is a species of beetle in the family Cerambycidae. It was described by Martin Schmidt in 1924, who named it Callichroma (Xenochroma) subpulvereum, designating it to be the type species of the subgenus Xenochroma, subsequently found to be an invalid. It is known from southeastern Brazil.
