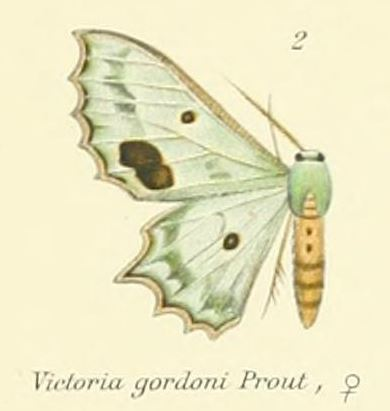

Scientific classification
- Kingdom: Animalia
- Phylum: Arthropoda
- Class: Insecta
- Order: Lepidoptera
- Family: Geometridae
- Subfamily: Geometrinae
- Genus: Victoria; Warren, 1897

Type species
- Victoria albipicta

= Victoria (moth) =

Genus of moths

Victoria is a genus of moths in the family Geometridae described by Warren in 1897. The species of this genus are found in Africa.

== Species ==
Some species of this genus are:

- Victoria albipicta Warren, 1897
- Victoria altimontaria Herbulot, 1971
- Victoria argopastea L. B. Prout, 1938
- Victoria barlowi L. B. Prout, 1922
- Victoria compsa L. B. Prout, 1932
- Victoria fifensis Wiltshire, 1994
- Victoria fuscithorax Warren, 1905
- Victoria gordoni L. B. Prout, 1912
- Victoria immunifica L. B. Prout, 1912
- Victoria melanochlora Carcasson, 1962
- Victoria perornata Warren, 1898
- Victoria rhodoblemma L. B. Prout, 1938
- Victoria sematoperas L. B. Prout, 1916
- Victoria subhyalina Herbulot, 1982
- Victoria taminata Herbulot, 1982
- Victoria triplaga L. B. Prout, 1915
- Victoria watsonae Carcasson, 1971
- Victoria wiltshirei Hausmann, 1996
