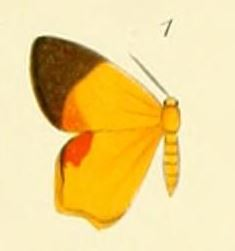
- Xanthodura trucidata

Scientific classification
- Kingdom: Animalia
- Phylum: Arthropoda
- Class: Insecta
- Order: Lepidoptera
- Family: Geometridae
- Subfamily: Geometrinae
- Genus: Xanthodura; Butler, 1880

= Xanthodura =

Genus of moths

Xanthodura is a genus of moths in the family Geometridae. It was first described by Arthur Gardiner Butler in 1880. It is endemic to Madagascar.

== Species ==
There are two recognized species:

- Xanthodura hypocrypta L. B. Prout, 1925
- Xanthodura trucidata Butler, 1880
