= Xenimpia =

Scientific classification
- Kingdom: Animalia
- Phylum: Arthropoda
- Class: Insecta
- Order: Lepidoptera
- Family: Geometridae
- Subfamily: Ennominae
- Genus: Xenimpia; Warren, 1895

Synonyms
- Hexeris Saalmüller, 1891; Procypha Warren, 1897; Triprora Warren, 1897

Genus of moths

Xenimpia is a genus of moths in the family Geometridae. It was described by Warren in 1895.

== Species ==
Some species of this genus are:

- Xenimpia albicaput D. S. Fletcher, 1956
- Xenimpia angusta Prout, 1915
- Xenimpia burgessi Carcasson, 1964
- Xenimpia chalepa Prout, 1915
- Xenimpia clenchi Viette, 1980
- Xenimpia conformis (Warren, 1898)
- Xenimpia crassimedia Herbulot, 1996
- Xenimpia crassipecten Herbulot, 1961
- Xenimpia dohertyi Herbulot, 1961
- Xenimpia erosa Warren, 1895 - type species
- Xenimpia flexuosa Herbulot, 1996
- Xenimpia hecqi Herbulot, 1996
- Xenimpia informis (C. Swinhoe, 1904)
- Xenimpia kala Herbulot, 1973
- Xenimpia karischi Herbulot, 1996
- Xenimpia fletcheri Herbulot, 1954
- Xenimpia lactesignata (Warren, 1914)
- Xenimpia loile Carcasson, 1964
- Xenimpia luxuriosa Herbulot, 1961
- Xenimpia maculosata (Warren, 1897)
- Xenimpia misogyna Carcasson, 1962
- Xenimpia opala Carcasson, 1964
- Xenimpia sillaria (C. Swinhoe, 1904)
- Xenimpia soricina Herbulot, 1973
- Xenimpia spinosivalis Herbulot, 1996
- Xenimpia tetracantha Herbulot, 1973
- Xenimpia transmarina Herbulot, 1961
- Xenimpia trizonata (Saalmüller, 1891)
- Xenimpia vastata Herbulot, 1996
