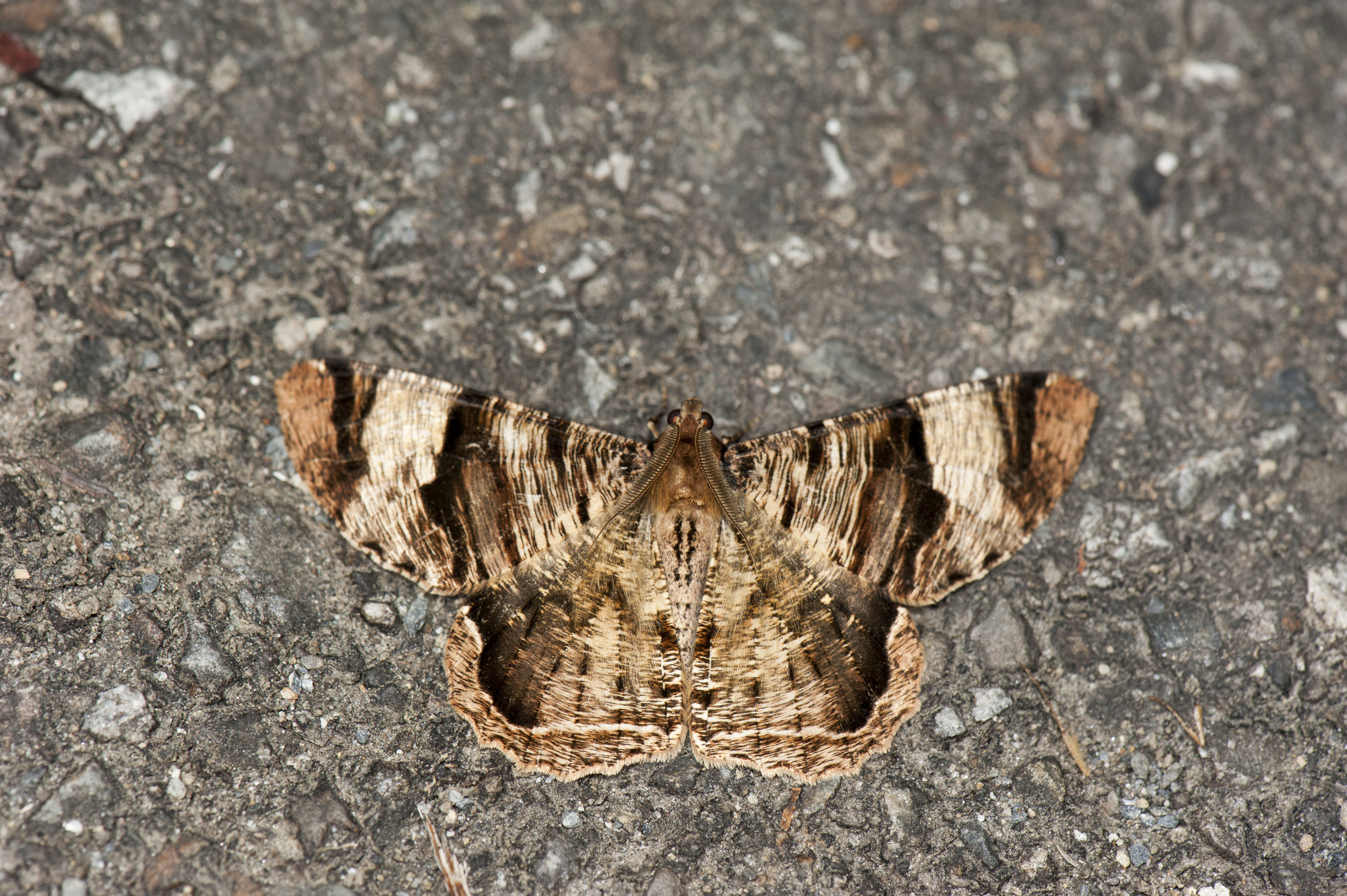
- Xandrames latiferaria

Scientific classification
- Kingdom: Animalia
- Phylum: Arthropoda
- Class: Insecta
- Order: Lepidoptera
- Family: Geometridae
- Tribe: Boarmiini
- Genus: Xandrames; Moore, 1868

= Xandrames (moth) =

Genus of moths

Xandrames is a genus of moths in the family Geometridae described by Frederic Moore in 1868.

== Species ==
- Xandrames albofasciata Moore, 1868
- Xandrames dholaria Moore, 1868
- Xandrames latiferaria (Walker, 1860)
- Xandrames opisthochroma Prout, 1928
- Xandrames postmarginata Wileman & South, 1917
- Xandrames xanthomelanaria Poujade, 1895
- Xandrames xanthos Sato, 1996
