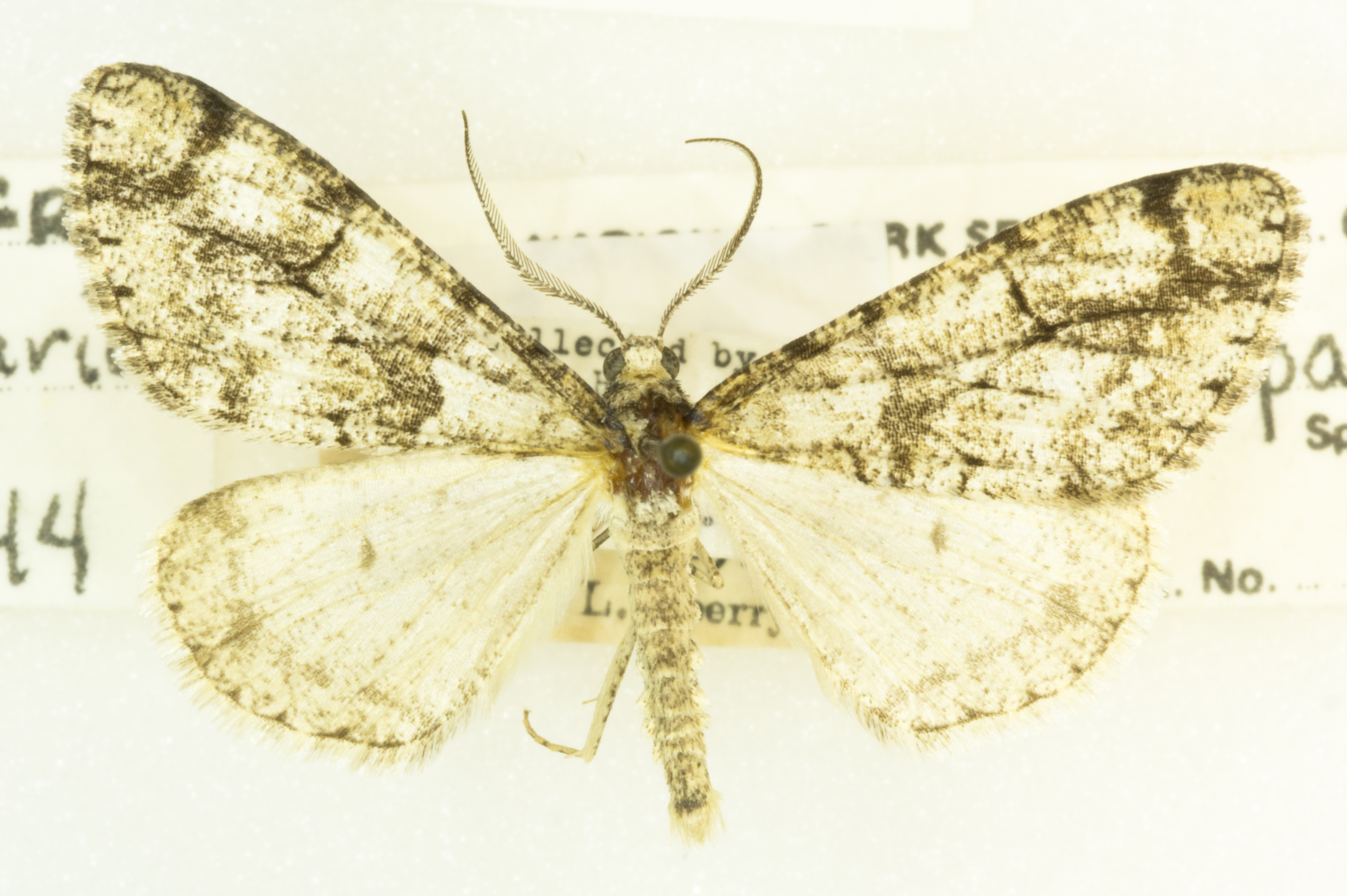
- Vinemina opacaria

Scientific classification
- Kingdom: Animalia
- Phylum: Arthropoda
- Class: Insecta
- Order: Lepidoptera
- Family: Geometridae
- Tribe: Melanolophiini
- Genus: Vinemina; McDunnough, 1920

= Vinemina =

Genus of moths

Vinemina is a genus of moths in the family Geometridae erected by James Halliday McDunnough in 1920.

== Species ==
- Vinemina perdita Guedet, 1939
- Vinemina opacaria (Hulst, 1881)
- Vinemina catalina McDunnough, 1945
