= Xanthabraxas =

Scientific classification
- Kingdom: Animalia
- Phylum: Arthropoda
- Clade: Pancrustacea
- Class: Insecta
- Order: Lepidoptera
- Family: Geometridae
- Genus: Xanthabraxas (Warren, 1894)
- Species: X. hemionata

Binomial name
- Xanthabraxas hemionata (Guenée, 1857)

Synonyms
- Abraxas hemionata Guenée, 1857

Genus of moths

Xanthabraxas is a monotypic moth genus in the subfamily Ennominae described by Warren in 1894. Its only species, Xanthabraxas hemionata, described by Achille Guenée in 1857, inhabits northern China.
