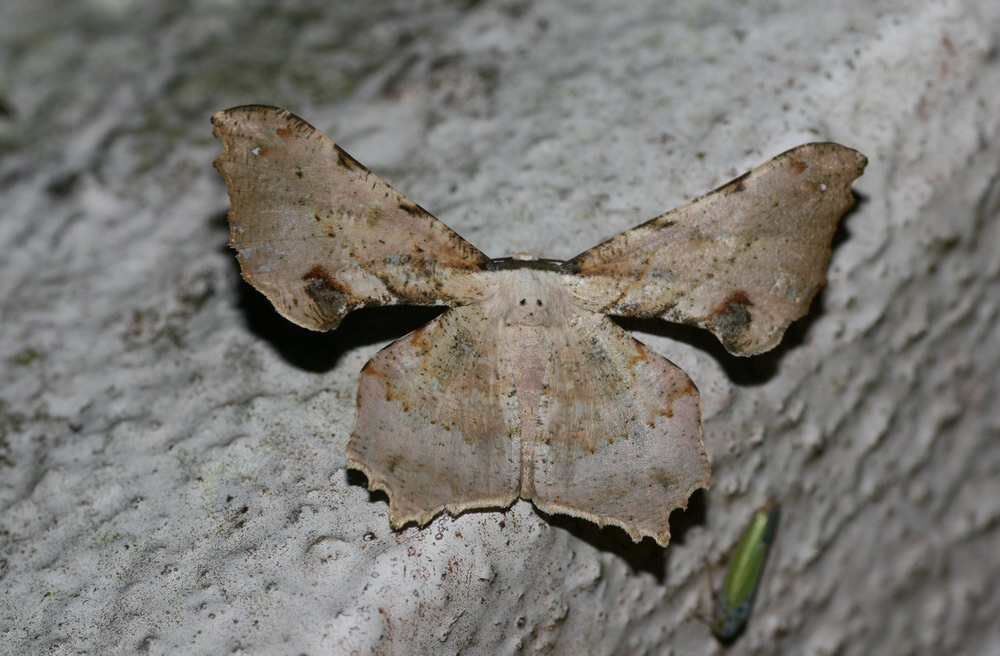
- Xylinophylla hypocausta

Scientific classification
- Kingdom: Animalia
- Phylum: Arthropoda
- Class: Insecta
- Order: Lepidoptera
- Family: Geometridae
- Subfamily: Ennominae
- Genus: Xylinophylla; Warren, 1898

Synonyms
- Adelphocrasta Warren, 1899

= Xylinophylla =

Genus of moths

Xylinophylla is a genus of moths in the family Geometridae first described by Warren in 1898.

== Species ==
Some species of this genus are:

- Xylinophylla flavifrons (Warren, 1902) (Solomons)
- Xylinophylla hypocausta (Warren, 1899) (Malaysia to Borneo, Philippines)
- Xylinophylla maculata (Warren, 1897) (New Guinea)
- Xylinophylla ochrea Warren, 1898 (Key Islands)
