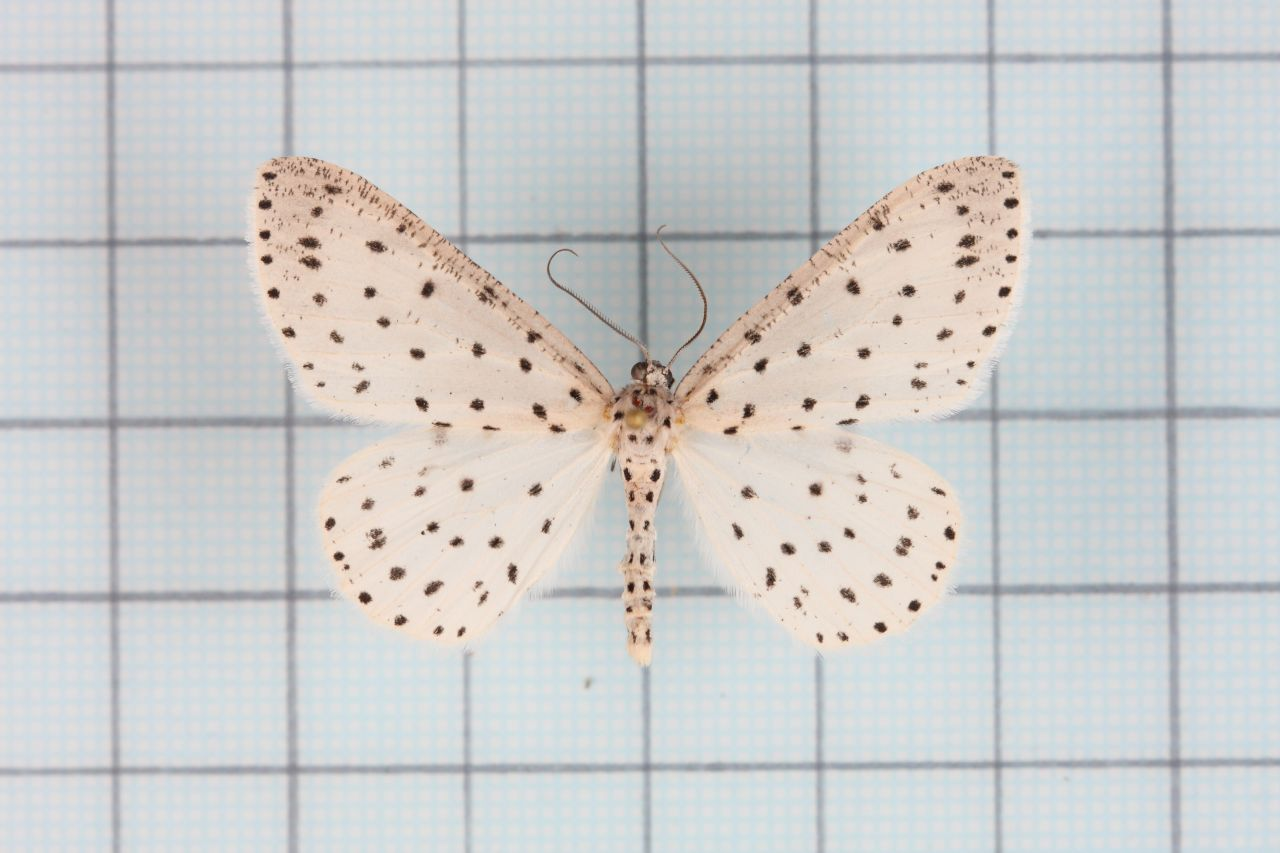
- Xenoplia trivialis

Scientific classification
- Kingdom: Animalia
- Phylum: Arthropoda
- Class: Insecta
- Order: Lepidoptera
- Family: Geometridae
- Subfamily: Ennominae
- Genus: Xenoplia; Warren, 1894

= Xenoplia =

Genus of moths

Xenoplia is a genus of moths in the family Geometridae.

== Species ==
- Xenoplia contrasqualida Inoue, 1992
- Xenoplia foraria (Guenee, 1857)
- Xenoplia maculata (Moore, 1868)
- Xenoplia trivialis (Yazaki, 1987)
