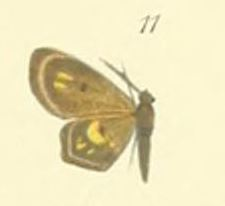
- Xenopepla bicuneata

Scientific classification
- Kingdom: Animalia
- Phylum: Arthropoda
- Class: Insecta
- Order: Lepidoptera
- Family: Geometridae
- Genus: Xenopepla; Warren, 1907

Synonyms
- Xenopepla Prout, 1910

= Xenopepla =

Genus of moths

Xenopepla is a genus of moths in the family Geometridae first described by Warren in 1907.

== Species ==
- Xenopepla bicuneata Prout, 1910
- Xenopepla flavinigra Warren, 1907
