= Xenochroma =

Scientific classification
- Kingdom: Animalia
- Phylum: Arthropoda
- Clade: Pancrustacea
- Class: Insecta
- Order: Lepidoptera
- Family: Geometridae
- Subfamily: Geometrinae
- Genus: Xenochroma; Warren, 1902

Type species
- Xenochroma candidata Warren, 1902

Synonyms
- Campsiceras Warren, 1914

Genus of moths

Xenochroma is a genus of moths in the family Geometridae.

As of 2020, the following nine species are recognized:

- Xenochroma aetherea (Debauche, 1941)
- Xenochroma angulosa Herbulot, 1984
- Xenochroma candidata Warren, 1902
- Xenochroma dyschlorata (Warren, 1914)
- Xenochroma palimpais Prout L. B., 1934
- Xenochroma planimargo Prout L. B., 1912
- Xenochroma roseimargo Janse, 1935
- Xenochroma salsa (Warren, 1897)
- Xenochroma silvatica Herbulot, 1984
