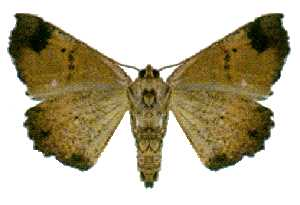
- Mnesampela privata

Scientific classification
- Kingdom: Animalia
- Phylum: Arthropoda
- Clade: Pancrustacea
- Class: Insecta
- Order: Lepidoptera
- Family: Geometridae
- Subfamily: Ennominae
- Tribe: Nacophorini; Forbes, 1948

Type genus
- Nacophora Hulst, 1896

Genera
- Many, see text

= Nacophorini =

Tribe of moths

The Nacophorini are one of the smaller tribes of geometer moths in the subfamily Ennominae. They are the most diverse Ennominae of Australia and are widespread in the Americas. If the African genera tentatively placed herein indeed belong here, the distribution of the Nacophorini is distinctly Gondwanan, with their probable origin either of Australia, South America or even Antarctica (which was not ice-covered until a few million years ago). In Eurasia, they are rare by comparison.

Despite the lack of thorough study of this tribe in modern times, as traditionally delimited they are probably nearly monophyletic, requiring only a few genera to be moved in and out of this group to make it correspond to a clade; as this involves the type species, the correct name for this clade might be Lithinini or maybe Campaeini, which are both liable to be eventually merged with the Nacophorini. The Azelinini, Ennomini and perhaps the Caberini are probably their closest living relatives, and a more radical approach to monophyly would be to merge the Nacophorini, Lithinini and possibly the Campaeini into the Ennomini.

== Description ==
Nacophorini are generally robust and quite hairy geometer moths, though some species are more delicate. Exceptional among their subfamily, many have slim wings. They typically rest with the hindwings tucked under the forewings. Nacophorini have long antennae, and most if not all have terminal sensillae shaped like stout pegs and sensillae basiconicae on the flagellomeres or rami. The "horn" between the antenna sockets which is present in many geometer moths is usually exceptionally well developed in the Nacophorini. Some have a crest of thorns on their thorax, and a few have a spine at the tip of their foreleg tibia. The hindleg tibia is usually swollen in males, which also often have a "penciltip" of hairs tucked into a groove. Together with a comb of setae on the third abdominal segment, these structures probably serve to distribute pheromones, and while the abdominal comb is found in many Ennominae, the full set of structures is rarely found outside of the Nacophorini, which usually possess at least a swollen tibia or tibial "pencil", and often both.

Wnile the female genitalia are rather nondescript, there are a number of features of the male genitalia that are usually not exclusive to Nacophorini, but in combination are quite characteristic. Like in most Boarmiini, the valval costa typically has a batch of bristles on its underside near the tip, whereas the harpe or "clasper" of Nacophorini lacks the complex modifications found in Boarmiini. The aedeagus has a pointed tip in almost all members of this tribe, displaying little of the variation found in related geometer moths. The anellus usually has extensions at the side, which extend from the edge of the juxta and can be lobes or spines, small or large, covered in bristles or nude. But unlike the similar-looking but probably analogous structures found in Ourapterygini these "furcae" are entirely or almost symmetrical in Nacophorini. The Lithinini and the Tasmanian Ennominae traditionally placed in the Archiearinae also have such symmetrical furcae, indicating the close relationship between them and the Nacophorini.

== Ecology ==
Larval food plants are mainly Rosidae. Caterpillars of the Australian and South American genera feed predominantly on Myrtaceae, including Campomanesia, Eucalyptus, Eugenia and guavas (Psidium). A rather notorious nacophorine species from the tropical Americas is the Brazilian eucalyptus brown looper (Thyrinteina arnobia), which can be a commercially significant pest in eucalyptus plantations. Faboideae and Mimosoideae have also been recorded as food plants.

Caterpillars of the African species tentatively placed in this tribe have been recorded from Cunoniaceae, Ericaceae, Fabaceae and Thymelaceae. Caterpillars of Declana from New Zealand, also tentatively placed in the Nacophorini, have been found on Myrtaceae (eucalyptus, Kunzea and Leptospermum), Pinaceae – larches (Larix), pines (Pinus, notably Monterey pine, P. radiata) and coast Douglas-fir (Pseudotsuga menziesii) –, and southern beeches (Nothofagaceae). In addition, they were found on a species of Olearia, the only euasterid recorded as food plant of Nacophorini to date.

== Systematics ==
The genera Oratha, usually placed in the Nacophorini, is in many aspects suspiciously similar to Pero of the Azelinini and Rhinodia of the Caberini. It is liable to be moved to either of these tribes.

Phaeoura, which includes Nacophora nowadays, appears to be closer to the Ennomini. As this includes the type species Phaeoura quernaria, Lithinini which might warrant merging with the Nacophorini would then supersede the name "Nacophorini", which would become a junior synonym of the Ennomini. The enigmatic genus Hoplosauris, of uncertain placement in the Ennominae, is in some respects intermediate between the Nacophorini and the Ennomini.

While the taxonomic and systematic questions are in need of thorough study, the situation regarding the Lithinini is more clear. Their genus Idiodes and some species formerly placed in the paraphyletic Metrocampa (at least "M." ada and "M." biplaga) appear very close to nacophorine genera – to Thalaina, and to Conosara and Corula, respectively. The Lithinini and the Nacophorini share the same apomorphies of the male genitalia, and their caterpillars are also very similar. It is unknown whether the somewhat more distinct Campaeini would warrant inclusion in this group too.

The Tasmanian genera Acalyphes and Dirce and possibly the South American Archiearides, traditionally placed in the subfamily Archiearinae, seem to be close relatives of the Australian nacophorines Niceteria and Paralaea and would probably need to be moved to the present tribe. And finally, there are some African genera as well as Declana from New Zealand which are tentatively assigned to the Nacophorini.

=== Selected genera ===
As numerous ennomine genera have not yet been assigned to a tribe, the genus list should be considered preliminary.

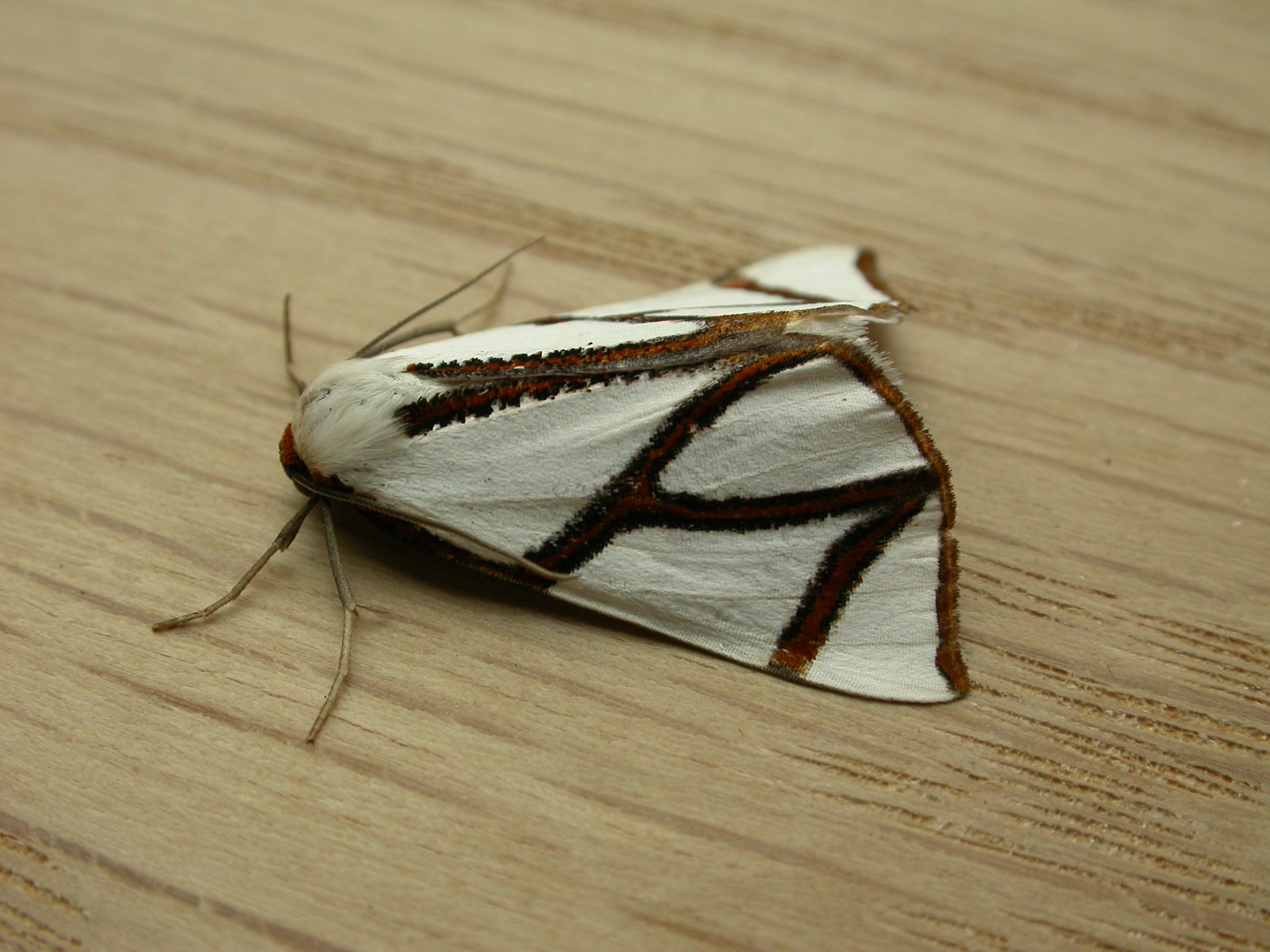
Clara's satin moth, Thalaina clara

- Achagua
- Aconcagua
- Acrasia (tentatively placed here)
- Aethaloida
- Amelora
- Amphiclasta
- Amphicrossa
- Androchela
- Animomyia
- Anischnopteris
- Aphantes
- Aphilopota (tentatively placed here)
- Aporoctena
- Archephanes
- Argidava
- Argyrophora (tentatively placed here)
- Authaemon
- Betulodes
- Bradyctena
- Callioratis (tentatively placed here)
- Canelo
- Capusa
- Cassythaphaga
- Ceratonyx
- Charca
- Chiricahua
- Chlenias
- Chlenomorpha
- Chrysomima
- Ciampa
- Cidariophanes
- Conosara
- Corula
- Cryphaea
- Crypsiphila
- Cycloprorodes
- Declana (tentatively placed here)
- Dectochilus
- Diptychis (tentatively placed here)
- Dolabrossa
- Drepanogynis (tentatively placed here)
- Drymoptila
- Dysbatus
- Epicompsa
- Erilophodes
- Fisera
- Furcatrox
- Gabriola
- Gastrina
- Hasodima
- Hebdomophruda (tentatively placed here)
- Hemimorina
- Hemnypia
- Holochroa
- Illa (tentatively placed here)
- Ischnopteris
- Kunanyia
- Lackrana
- Mauna (tentatively placed here)
- Melanodes
- Microligia (tentatively placed here)
- Mictodoca
- Mnesampela
- Mochlotona
- Nazca
- Niceteria
- Nisista
- Oratha (probably belongs in Azelinini or Caberini)
- Pachycnemoides (tentatively placed here)
- Palleopa
- Papago
- Paralaea
- Parexcelsa
- Phaeoura (probably belongs in Ennomini, includes Nacophora)
- Plesanemma
- Pseudomaenas (tentatively placed here)
- Rhynchopsota
- Rucana
- Smyriodes
- Stibaroma
- Thalaina
- Thyrinteina
- Veniliodes (tentatively placed here)
- Yermoia
- Zerenopsis (tentatively placed here)

As noted above, Acalyphes, Dirce and possibly Archiearides would seem to need moving here from the Archiearinae, and at least some Lithinini and perhaps Campaeini seem to belong here too.
