= Aconcagua (disambiguation) =

Aconcagua may refer to:

- Aconcagua, mountain in Mendoza, Argentina
- Aconcagua Provincial Park, provincial park in Mendoza, Argentina
- Universidad del Aconcagua, university in Mendoza, Argentina
- San Felipe de Aconcagua Province, Valparaíso, Chile
- Aconcagua River, Chile
- Aconcagua (film), a 1964 Argentine film
- Aconcagua (video game), a 2000 adventure video game
- Aconcagua (moth), a genus of moths
- Aconcagua (wine region)
- Aconcagua Point, The Triplets (Robert Island)
- Aconcagua (1922 steamship)
