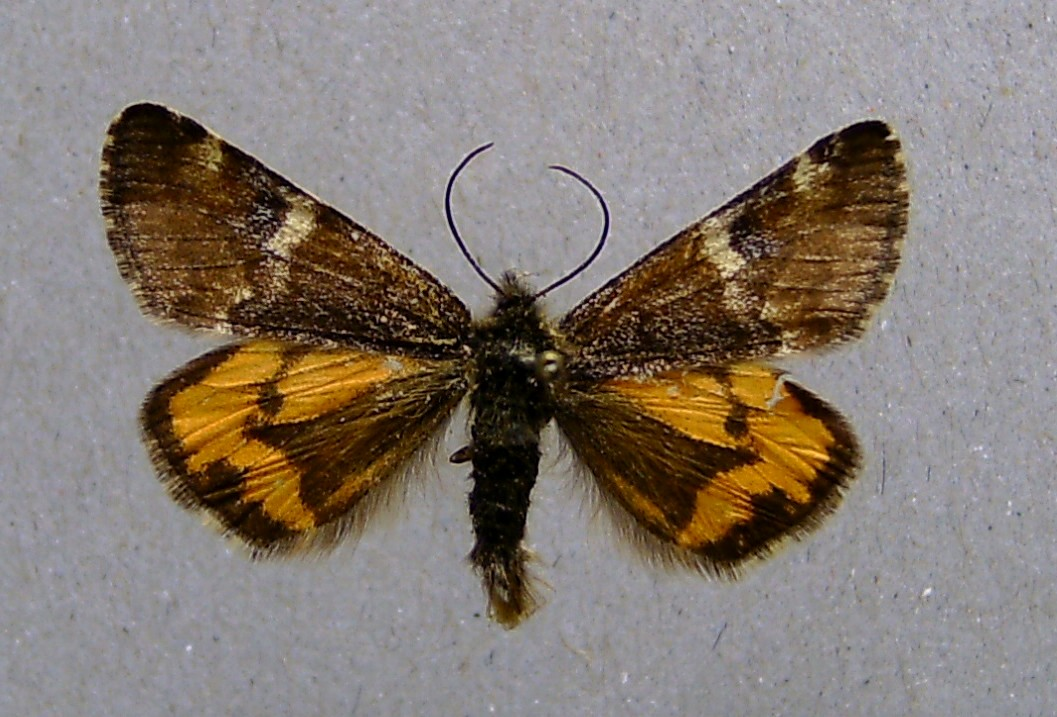
- Archiearis parthenias

Scientific classification
- Kingdom: Animalia
- Phylum: Arthropoda
- Clade: Pancrustacea
- Class: Insecta
- Order: Lepidoptera
- Family: Geometridae
- Subfamily: Archiearinae; D. S. Fletcher, 1953

= Archiearinae =

Subfamily of moths

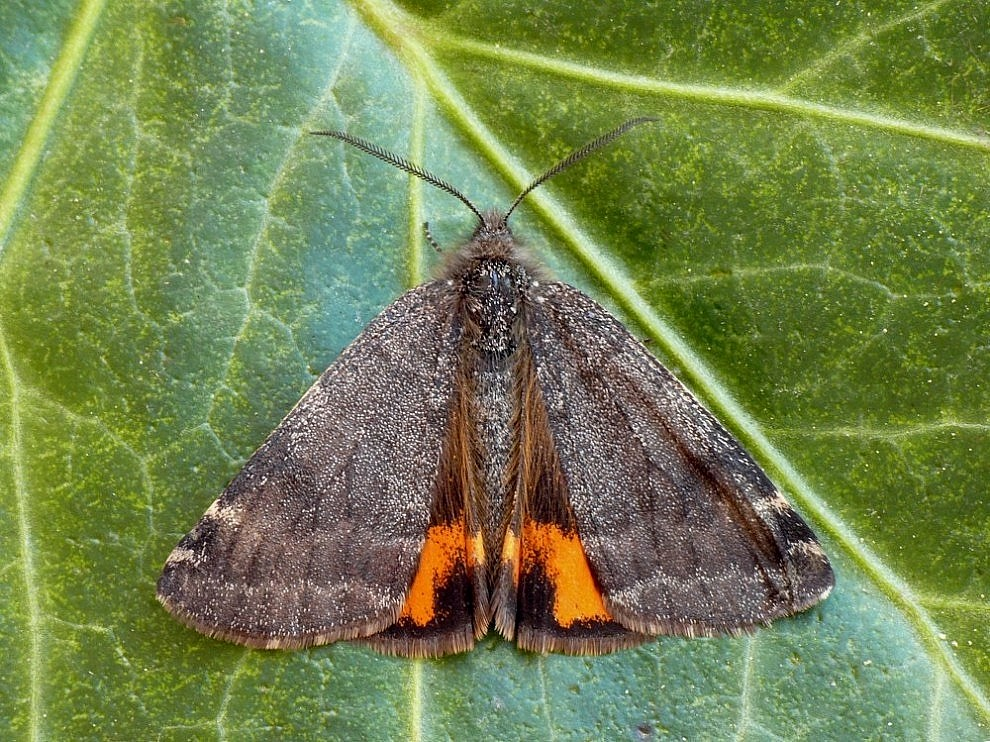
Archiearis notha

Archiearinae is a subfamily of the geometer moth family (Geometridae). It was described by David Stephen Fletcher in 1953.

== Genera ==
The subfamily contains the following genera:

- Acalyphes Turner, 1926
- Archiearides D. S. Fletcher, 1953
- Archiearis Hübner, 1823
- Boudinotiana Leraut, 2002
- Caenosynteles Dyar, 1912
- Dirce Prout, 1910
- Lachnocephala D. S. Fletcher, 1953
- Leucobrephos Grote, 1874
