= Achagua (moth) =

Scientific classification
- Kingdom: Animalia
- Phylum: Arthropoda
- Class: Insecta
- Order: Lepidoptera
- Family: Geometridae
- Tribe: Nacophorini
- Genus: Achagua; Rindge, 1983

Genus of geometer moths

Achagua is a small Neotropical genus of moths in the family Geometridae, with species found in South and Central America. Specimens are seldomly collected.

== Taxonomy ==
Achagua was erected by Frederick H. Rindge in 1983, and placed in tribe Nacophorini of the Geometridae. Phylogenetic research in 2019 confirmed its placement in Nacophorini, and placed Achagua as sister taxon to the genera Gabriola and Cargolia.

At the time of the Rindge's description, Achagua obsoleta was the sole formally described species in the genus, although Rindge mentioned—but did not provide a formal first description or name of—a second species. This second species was, alongside two further species, formally described in 2023 by Tanner A. Matson.

=== Species ===
- Achagua obsoleta Rindge, 1983 - Colombia - type species
- Achagua magna Matson, 2023 - Peru, Bolivia and Ecuador
- Achagua cooperae Matson, 2023 - Costa Rica, Mexico
- Achagua velata Matson, 2023 - French Guiana
