= Ceratonyx satanaria =

Scientific classification
- Kingdom: Animalia
- Phylum: Arthropoda
- Class: Insecta
- Order: Lepidoptera
- Family: Geometridae
- Tribe: Nacophorini
- Genus: Ceratonyx
- Species: C. satanaria

Binomial name
- Ceratonyx satanaria Guenée in Boisduval & Guenée, 1858

Species of moth

Ceratonyx satanaria is a species of geometrid moth in the family Geometridae. It is found in North America.

The MONA or Hodges number for Ceratonyx satanaria is 6780.
