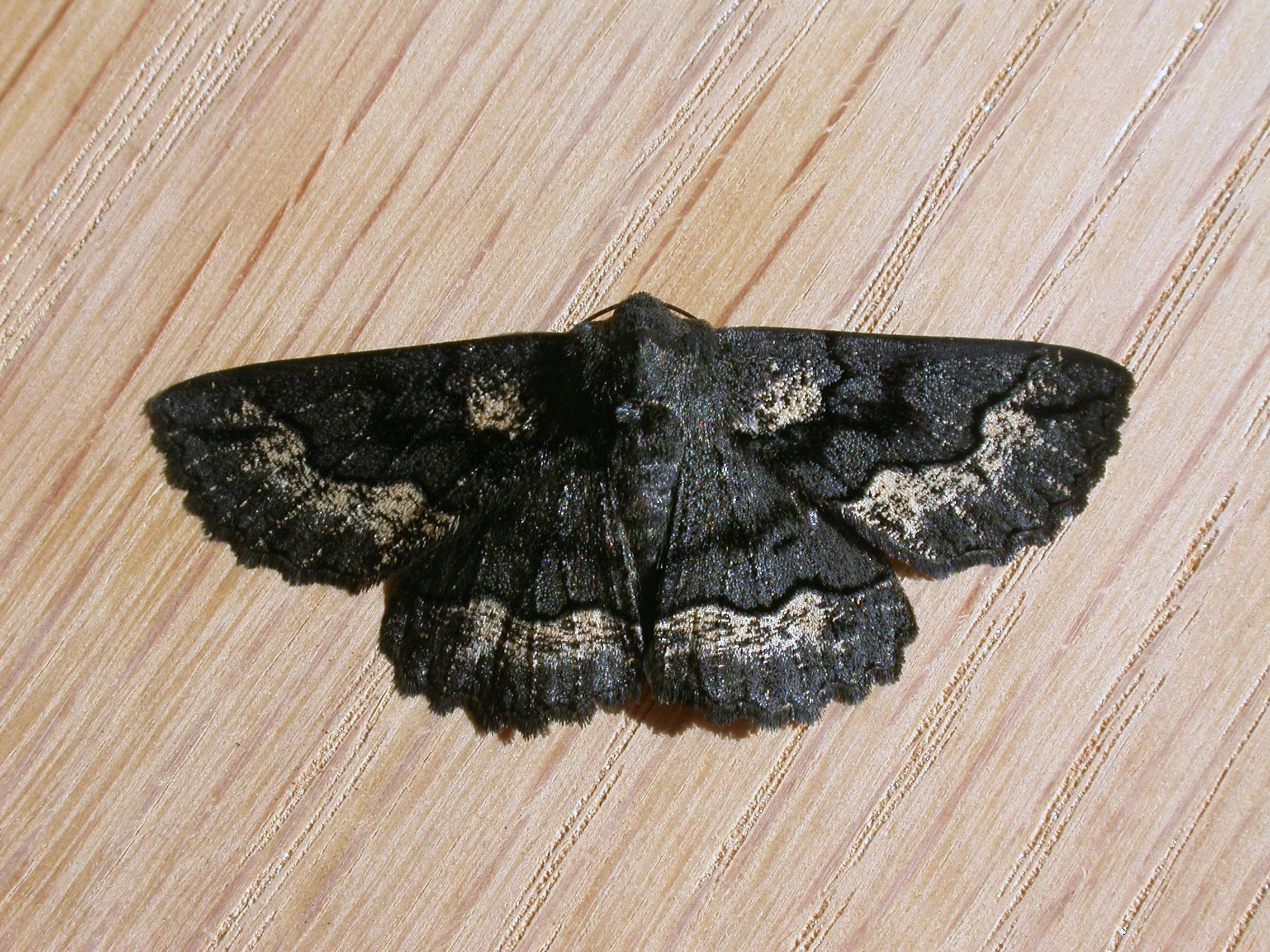

Scientific classification
- Kingdom: Animalia
- Phylum: Arthropoda
- Class: Insecta
- Order: Lepidoptera
- Family: Geometridae
- Tribe: Nacophorini
- Genus: Melanodes; Guenée, 1857
- Species: M. anthracitaria

Binomial name
- Melanodes anthracitaria Guenée, 1857

Synonyms
- Praxis corvus Walker, [1858]

= Melanodes =

Genus of moths

Melanodes is a monotypic moth genus in the family Geometridae. Its only species, Melanodes anthracitaria, the black geometrid, is found in Australia, more specifically in southern Queensland, New South Wales, Victoria, South Australia, and Tasmania. The genus and species were described by Achille Guenée in 1857.

The wingspan is about 50 mm for females and 40 mm for males. The moth flies from August to January depending on the location.

The larvae feed on Eucalyptus species.
