= Acrasia (moth) =

Scientific classification
- Kingdom: Animalia
- Phylum: Arthropoda
- Clade: Pancrustacea
- Class: Insecta
- Order: Lepidoptera
- Family: Geometridae
- Tribe: Nacophorini
- Genus: Acrasia; Rogenhofer, 1875

Genus of geometer moths

Acrasia is a genus of moths in the family Geometridae.

== Species ==
Acrasia contains the following species:

- Acrasia accepta Krüger, 2013
- Acrasia amoena Krüger, 2013
- Acrasia ava (Prout L. B., 1938)
- Acrasia avellanata Krüger, 2013
- Acrasia chimalensis Krüger, 2013
- Acrasia crinita Felder & Rogenhofer, 1875 - type species.
- Acrasia drakensbergensis (Herbulot, 1992)
- Acrasia dukei Krüger, 2013
- Acrasia grandis Krüger, 2013
- Acrasia lechriogramma Krüger, 2013
- Acrasia lenzi Krüger, 2013
- Acrasia modesta Krüger, 2007
- Acrasia monticola Krüger, 2013
- Acrasia nyangica Krüger, 2013
- Acrasia punctillata (Prout L. B., 1938)
- Acrasia robusta Krüger, 2013
- Acrasia similis Krüger, 2013
- Acrasia sympatrica Krüger, 2013
