= Amphicrossa =

Scientific classification
- Kingdom: Animalia
- Phylum: Arthropoda
- Class: Insecta
- Order: Lepidoptera
- Family: Geometridae
- Tribe: Nacophorini
- Genus: Amphicrossa; Lower, 1902

Genus of geometer moths

Amphicrossa is a genus of moths in the family Geometridae.

== Species ==
- Amphicrossa adelosticha (Turner, 1926)
- Amphicrossa hemadelpha (Lower, 1897)
