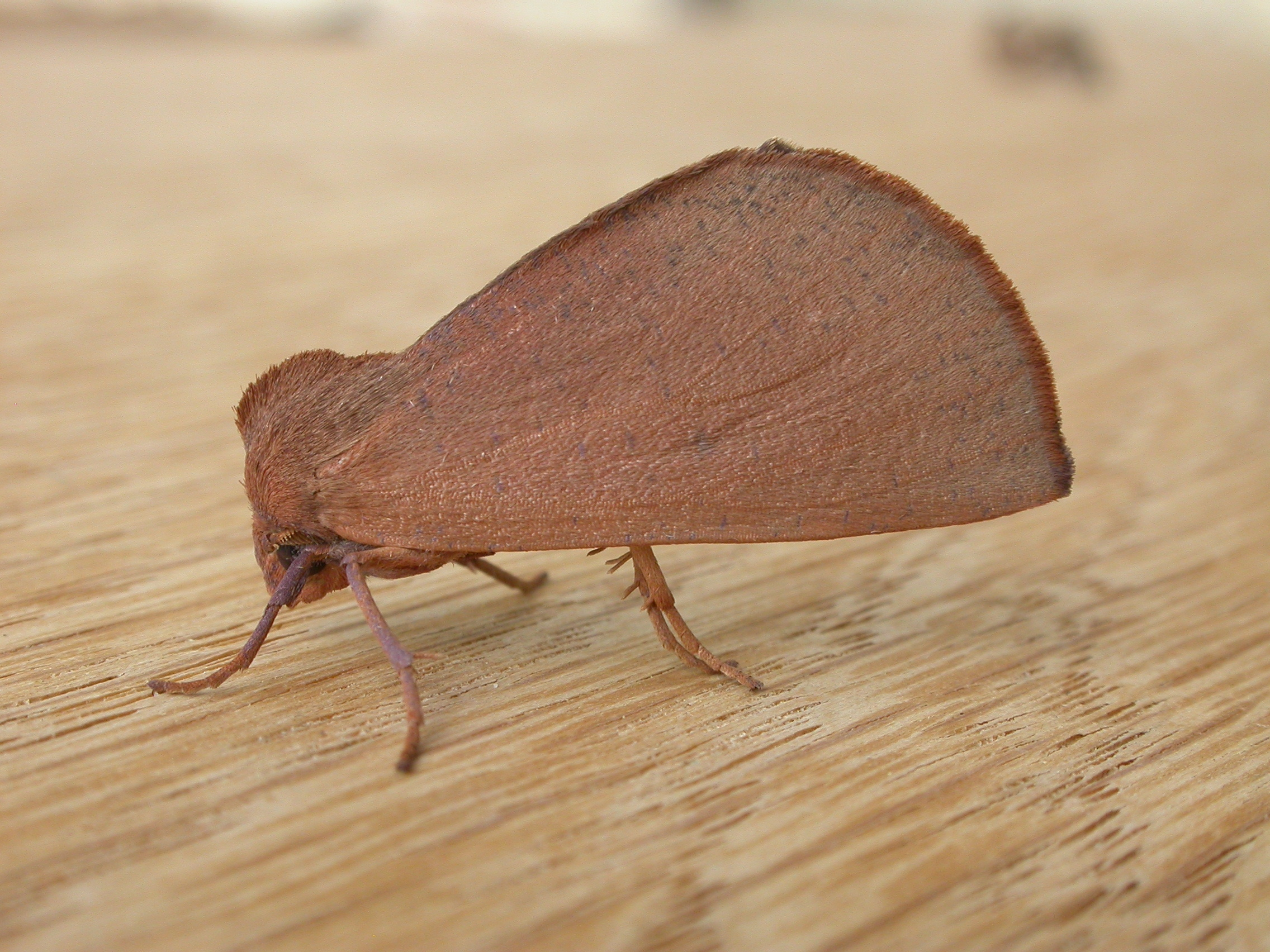
- Fisera perplexata

Scientific classification
- Kingdom: Animalia
- Phylum: Arthropoda
- Clade: Pancrustacea
- Class: Insecta
- Order: Lepidoptera
- Family: Geometridae
- Tribe: Nacophorini
- Genus: Fisera; Walker, 1860

Species
- About 9, see text

Synonyms
- Criomacha

= Fisera =

Genus of moths

Fisera is a genus of moths in the family Geometridae, the geometer moths. The genus is native to Australia. The genus was erected by Francis Walker in 1860.

There are about nine species.

Species include:

- Fisera belidearia
- Fisera bradymorpha
- Fisera dictyodes
- Fisera eribola
- Fisera halurga
- Fisera hypoleuca
- Fisera nicholsoni
- Fisera perplexata
- Fisera phricotypa
