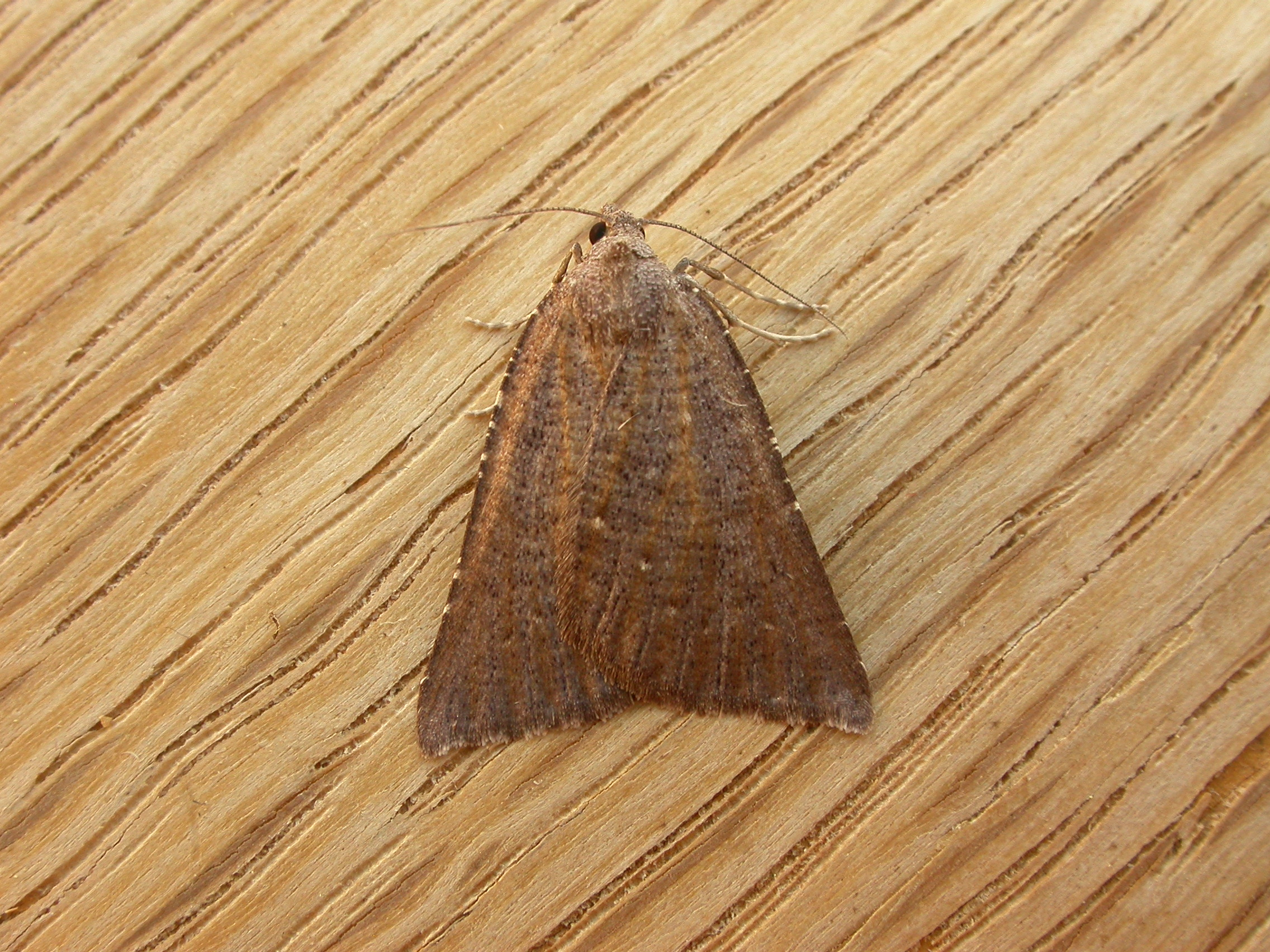

Scientific classification
- Kingdom: Animalia
- Phylum: Arthropoda
- Class: Insecta
- Order: Lepidoptera
- Family: Geometridae
- Genus: Amelora
- Species: A. arotraea

Binomial name
- Amelora arotraea Meyrick, 1892

= Amelora arotraea =

Species of moth

Amelora arotraea is a moth of the family Geometridae. It is found in Australia, including Tasmania.
