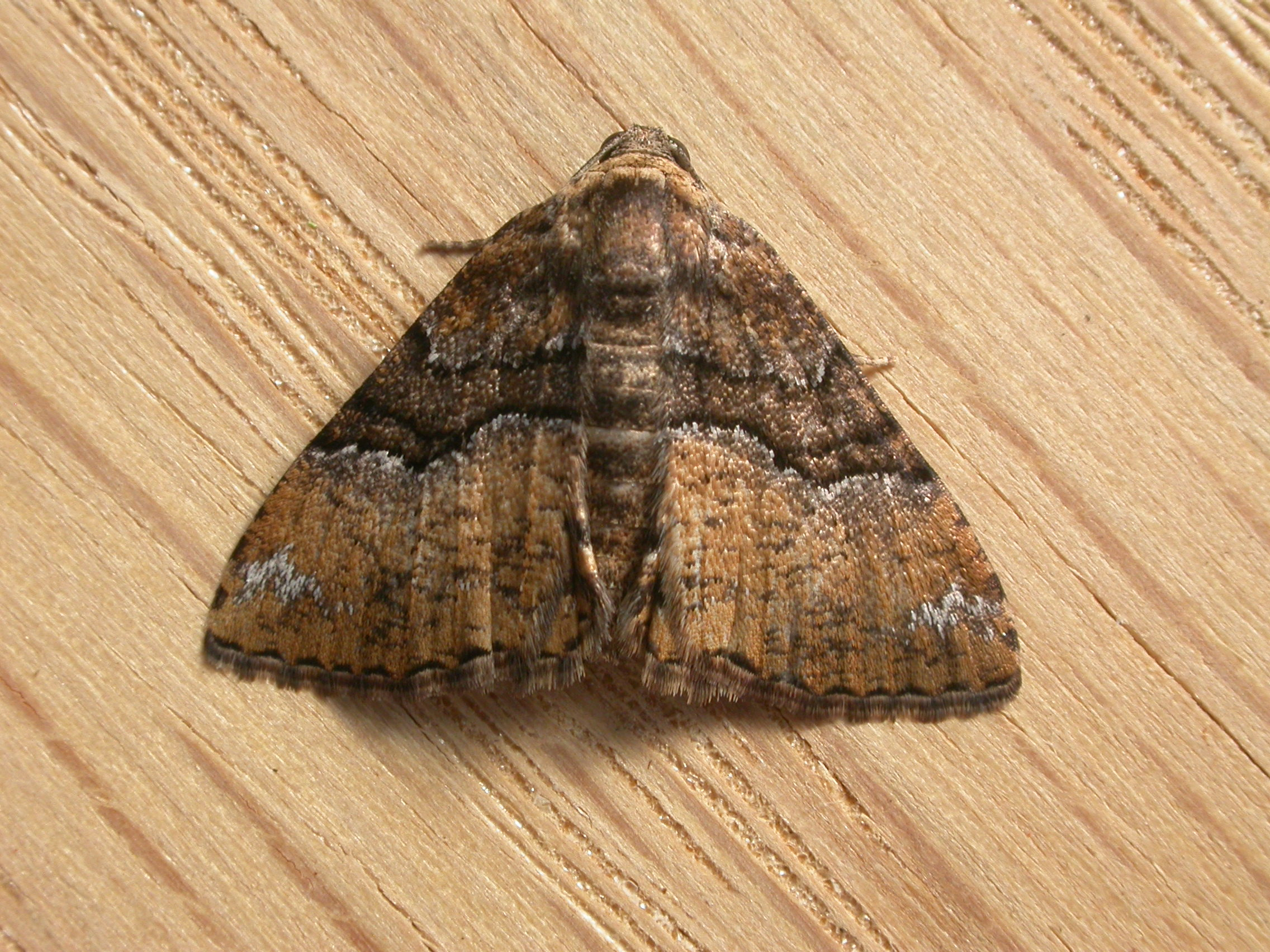

Scientific classification
- Kingdom: Animalia
- Phylum: Arthropoda
- Clade: Pancrustacea
- Class: Insecta
- Order: Lepidoptera
- Family: Geometridae
- Tribe: Nacophorini
- Genus: Aporoctena; Meyrick, 1892

= Aporoctena =

Genus of geometer moths

Aporoctena is a genus of moths in the family Geometridae.

== Species ==
- Aporoctena aprepes (Turner, 1904)
- Aporoctena scierodes (Meyrick, 1892)
