= Argyrophora =

Scientific classification
- Kingdom: Animalia
- Phylum: Arthropoda
- Class: Insecta
- Order: Lepidoptera
- Family: Geometridae
- Tribe: Nacophorini
- Genus: Argyrophora; Guenée, [1858]

Genus of moths

Argyrophora is a genus of moths in the family Geometridae first described by Achille Guenée in 1858.

== Species ==
- Argyrophora arcualis Duncan [& Westwood], 1841
- Argyrophora trofonia Cramer, [1779]
