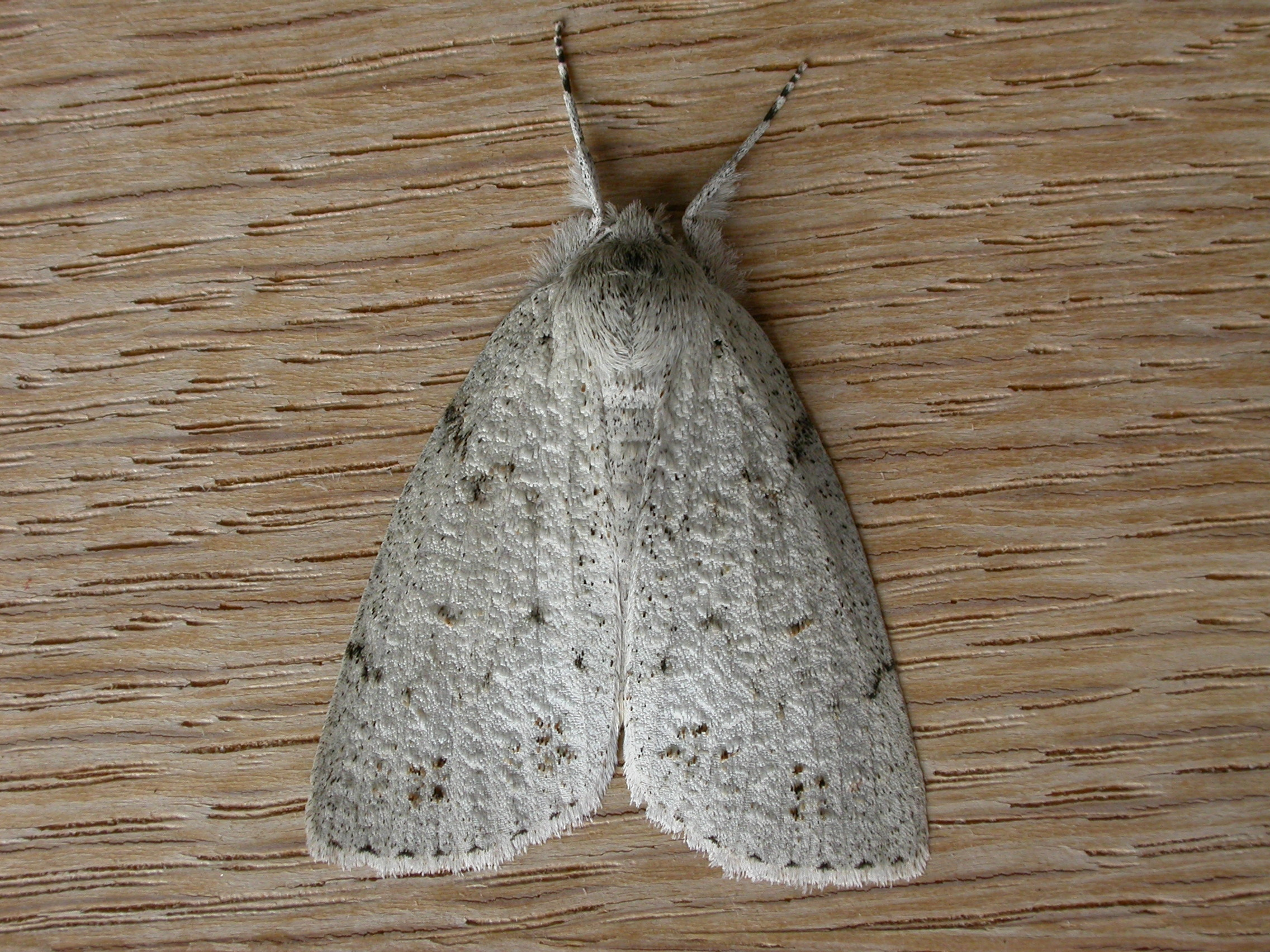

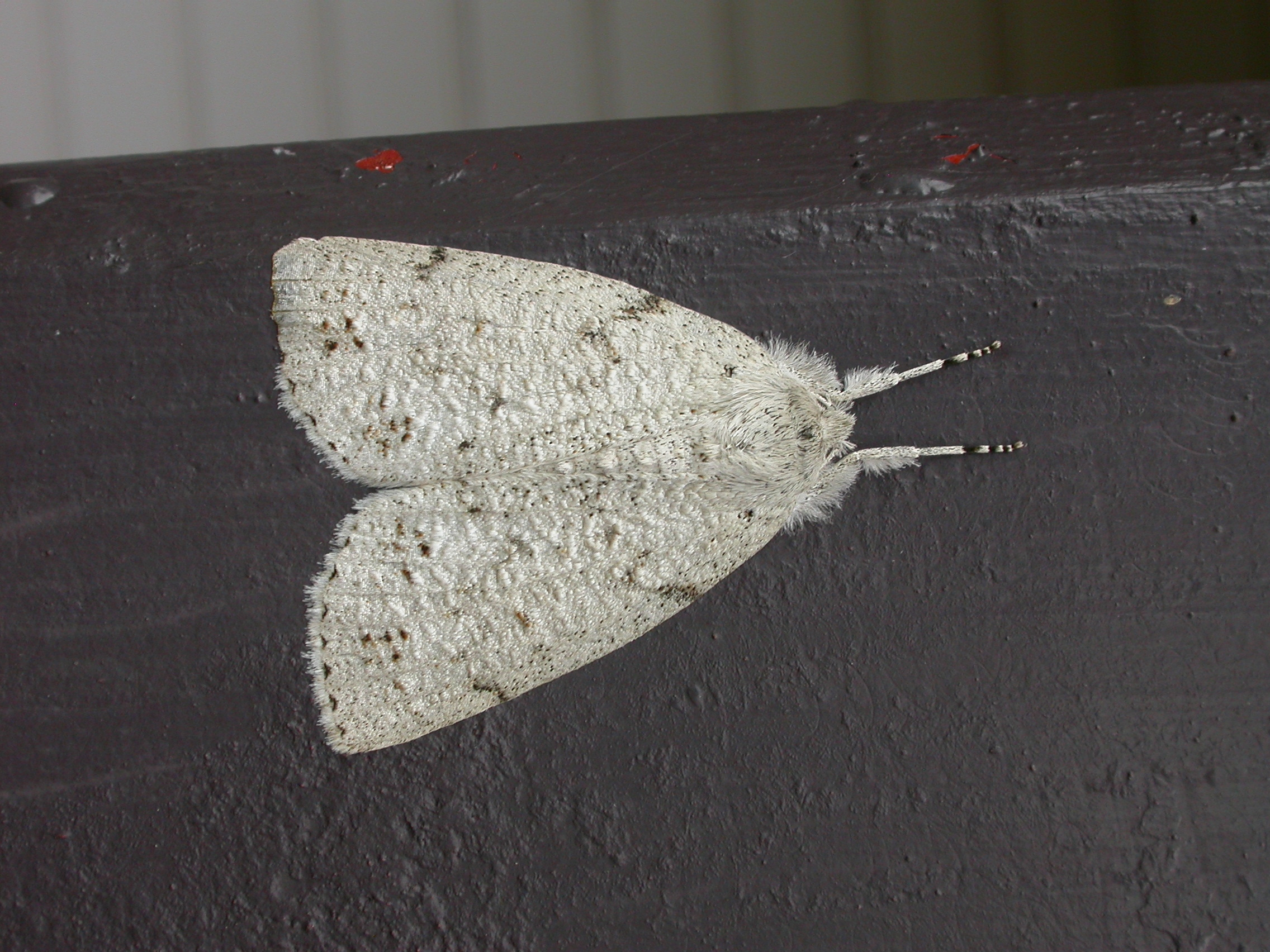

Scientific classification
- Kingdom: Animalia
- Phylum: Arthropoda
- Class: Insecta
- Order: Lepidoptera
- Family: Geometridae
- Tribe: Nacophorini
- Genus: Mochlotona; Meyrick, 1892
- Species: M. phasmatias

Binomial name
- Mochlotona phasmatias Meyrick, 1892

Synonyms
- Haploceros sphenotypa Turner, 1947

= Mochlotona =

Genus of moths

Mochlotona is a monotypic moth genus in the family Geometridae. Its only species, Mochlotona phasmatias, is known from Australia. Both the genus and species were first described by Edward Meyrick in 1892.
