= Nazca (moth) =

Scientific classification
- Kingdom: Animalia
- Phylum: Arthropoda
- Class: Insecta
- Order: Lepidoptera
- Family: Geometridae
- Tribe: Nacophorini
- Genus: Nazca

Genus of moths

Nazca is a genus of moth in the family Geometridae.
