= Bradyctena =

Scientific classification
- Kingdom: Animalia
- Phylum: Arthropoda
- Class: Insecta
- Order: Lepidoptera
- Family: Geometridae
- Tribe: Nacophorini
- Genus: Bradyctena; Turner, 1930

Genus of moths

Bradyctena is a genus of moths in the family Geometridae.

== Species ==
- Bradyctena trychnoptila (Turner, 1906)
