= Anischnopteris =

Scientific classification
- Kingdom: Animalia
- Phylum: Arthropoda
- Class: Insecta
- Order: Lepidoptera
- Family: Geometridae
- Tribe: Nacophorini
- Genus: Anischnopteris; Rindge, 1983

Genus of geometer moths

Anischnopteris is a genus of moths in the family Geometridae described by Rindge in 1983.

== Species ==
- Anischnopteris chryses Druce, 1893
