= Aphantes =

Scientific classification
- Kingdom: Animalia
- Phylum: Arthropoda
- Clade: Pancrustacea
- Class: Insecta
- Order: Lepidoptera
- Family: Geometridae
- Tribe: Nacophorini
- Genus: Aphantes; D. S. Fletcher, 1979

Genus of geometer moths

Aphantes is a genus of moths in the family Geometridae. It was described by David Stephen Fletcher in 1979.

== Species ==
- Aphantes melanochorda (Turner, 1919)
