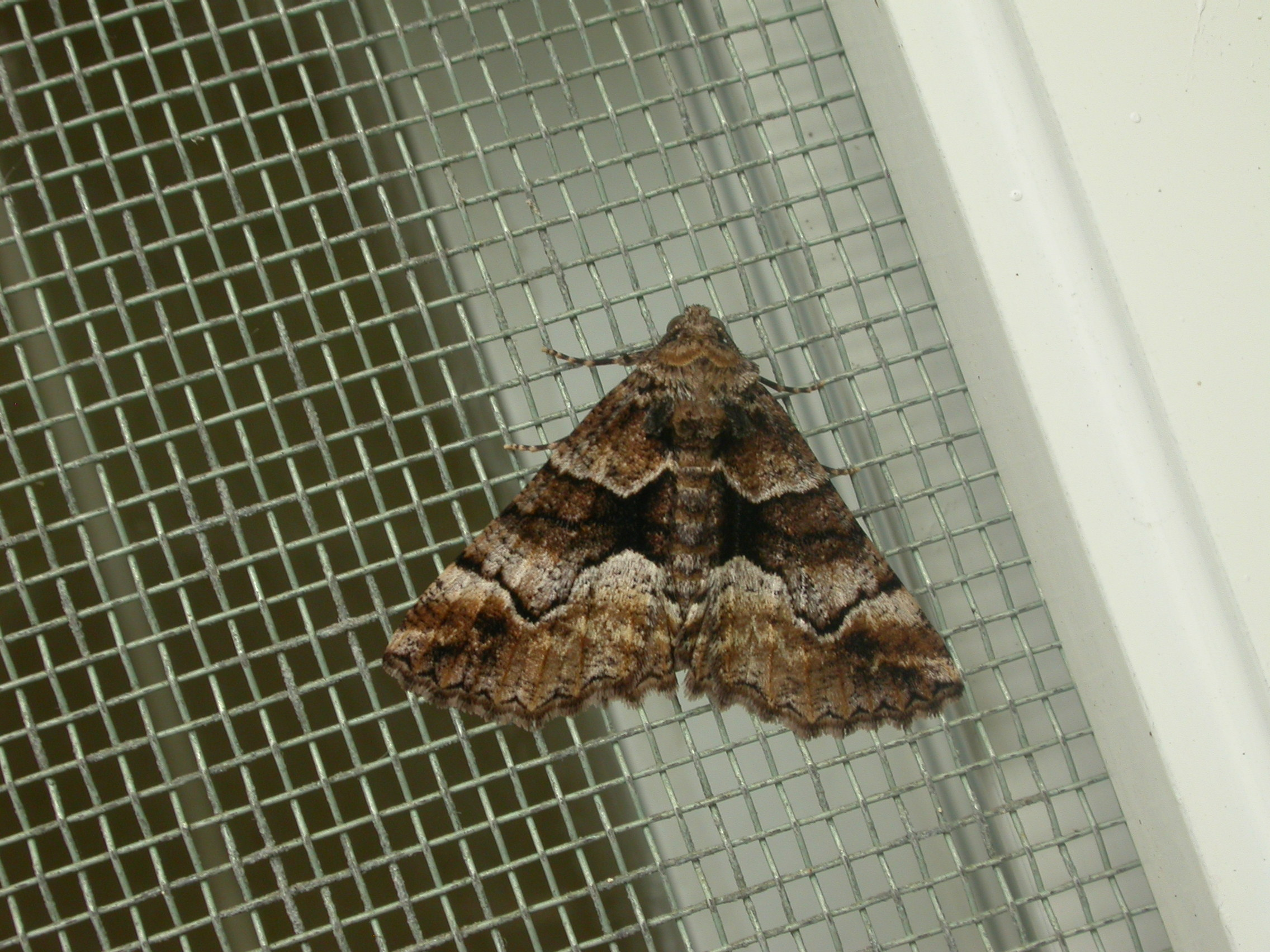

Scientific classification
- Kingdom: Animalia
- Phylum: Arthropoda
- Clade: Pancrustacea
- Class: Insecta
- Order: Lepidoptera
- Family: Geometridae
- Tribe: Nacophorini
- Genus: Gastrina; Guenée, 1857
- Species: G. cristaria

Binomial name
- Gastrina cristaria Guenée, 1857

Synonyms
- Generic; Passa Walker, 1866; Specific; Praxis illapsa Walker, [1858]; Hypochroma velutinata Walker, 1860; Passa latifasciata Walker, 1866

= Gastrina =

Genus of moths

Gastrina is a monotypic genus of moth in the family Geometridae. Its only species, Gastrina cristaria, the wave-lined geometrid, is found in the south-eastern quarter of Australia. Both the genus and species were first described by Achille Guenée in 1857.
