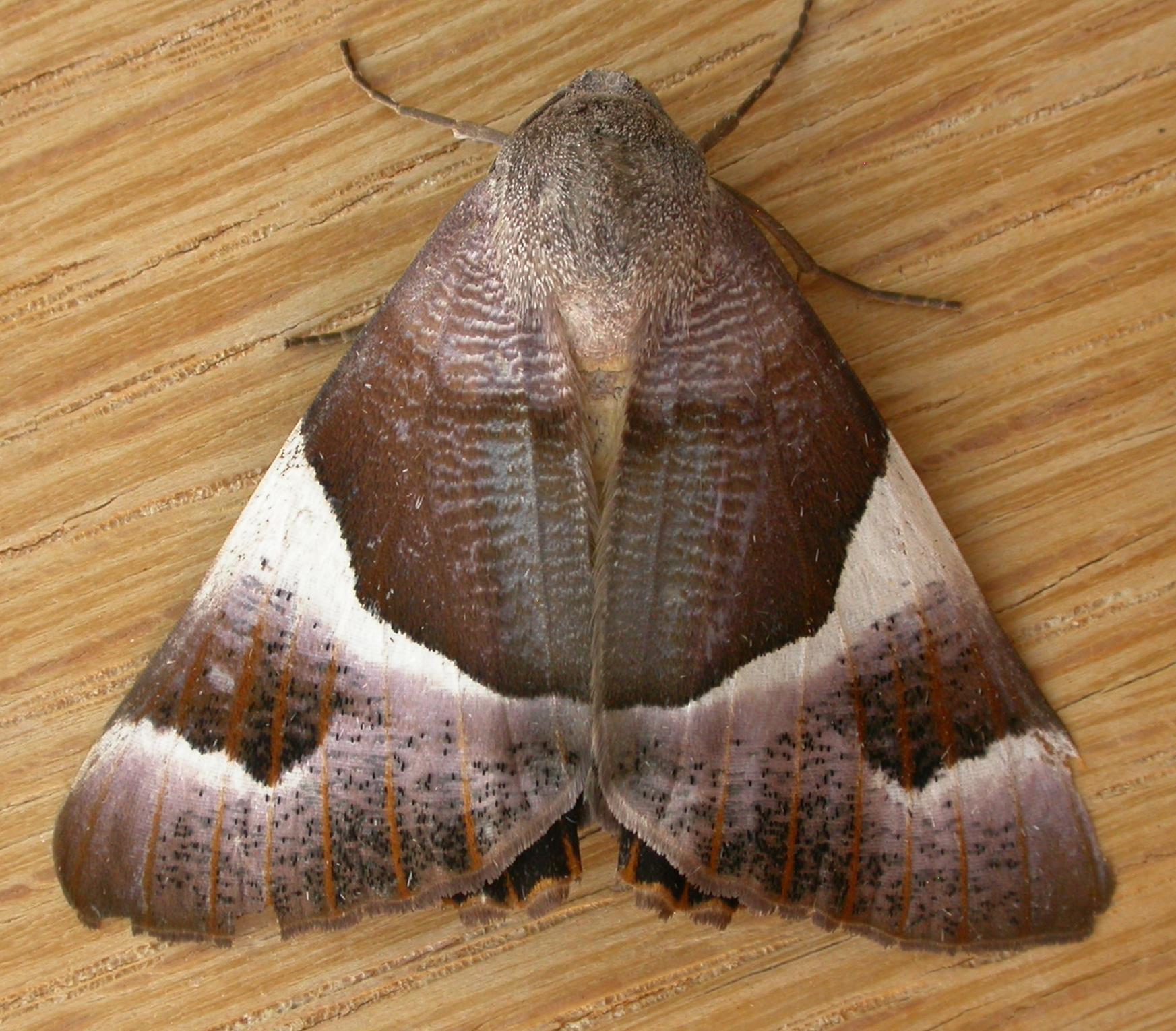

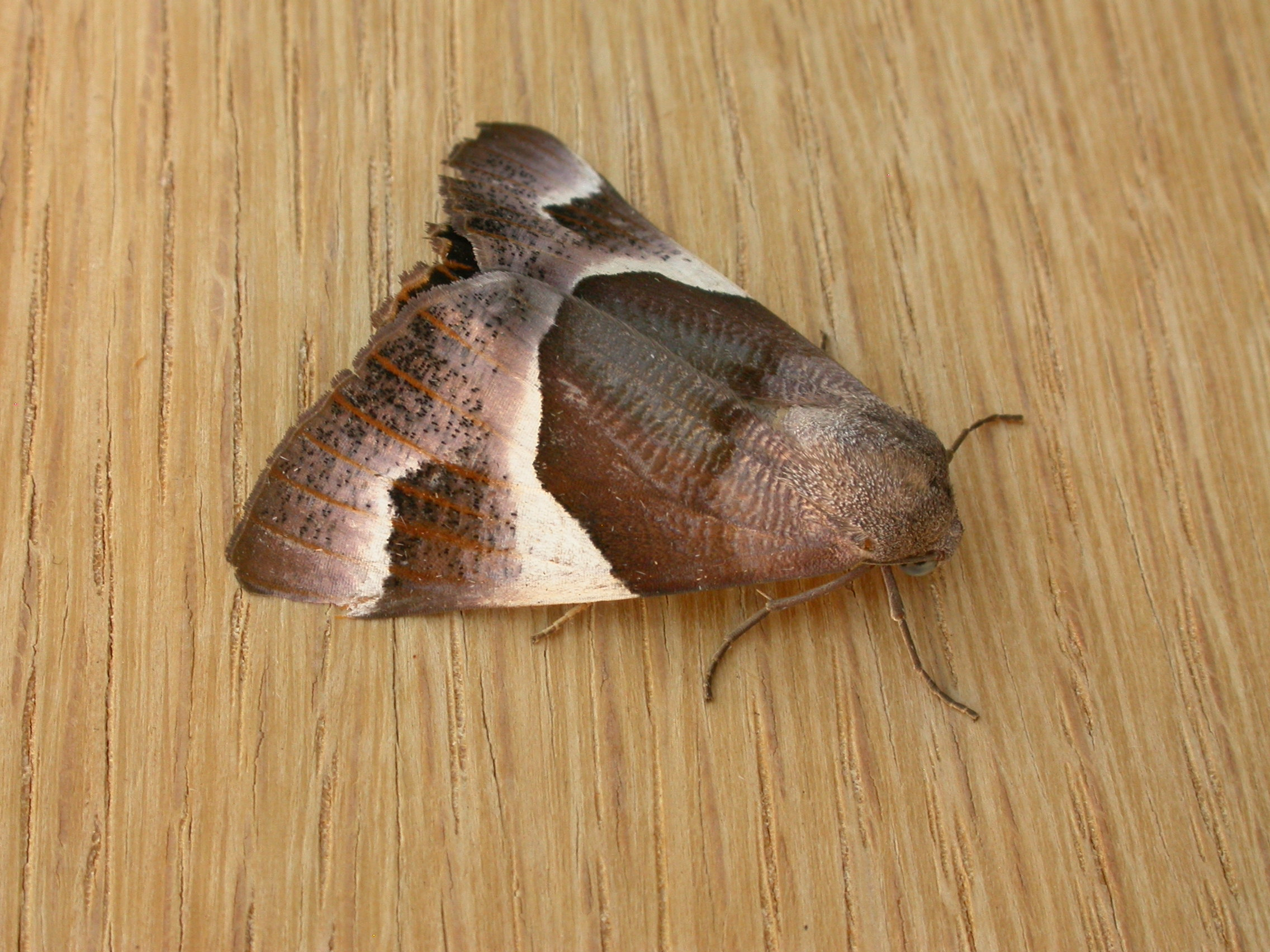

Scientific classification
- Kingdom: Animalia
- Phylum: Arthropoda
- Clade: Pancrustacea
- Class: Insecta
- Order: Lepidoptera
- Family: Geometridae
- Tribe: Nacophorini
- Genus: Niceteria; Turner, 1929
- Species: N. macrocosma

Binomial name
- Niceteria macrocosma (Lower, 1899)

Synonyms
- Satraparchis macrocosma Lower, 1899

= Niceteria =

Genus of moths

Niceteria is a monotypic genus of moths in the family Geometridae erected by Alfred Jefferis Turner in 1929. Its only species, Niceteria macrocosma, the showy geometrid, is found in Australia. It was first described by Oswald Bertram Lower in 1899.

The wingspan is about 40 mm.

The larvae feed on Myrtaceae species, including Angophora costata.
