= Argidava (moth) =

Scientific classification
- Kingdom: Animalia
- Phylum: Arthropoda
- Class: Insecta
- Order: Lepidoptera
- Family: Geometridae
- Tribe: Nacophorini
- Genus: Argidava; Walker, [1863]

Genus of moths

Argidava is a genus of moths in the family Geometridae erected by Francis Walker in 1863.

The List of the Specimens of Lepidopterous Insects in the Collection of the British Museum describes a specimen as follows:

Male. Body rather slender. Proboscis stout. Palpi porrect, pilose, hardly extending beyond the head; third joint extremely short. Antennas moderately pectinated. Abdomen slightly compressed, not extending beyond the hind wings; apical tuft small, elongate. Legs smooth, slender. Wings rather broad; exterior border hardly festooned. Fore wings acute; costa straight; exterior border slightly convex and oblique.

== Species ==
The Index of Scientific Names lists the following names:

- Argidava irrorata
- Argidava maculata
- Argidava punctata Butler
- Argidava sparsularia, a subjective synonym of subviduata Meyrick 1892
- Argidava subviduata Walker, [1863]

=== Argidava subviduata ===
The List of the Specimens of Lepidopterous Insects in the Collection of the British Museum describes a specimen as follows:

Male. Pale slaty cinereous. Head blackish brown in front. Wings very thinly and minutely black-speckled. Fore wings with the interior and submarginal lines composed of black dots; a black dot near the base, and a black elongated discal spot; marginal points black. Hind wings with some trace of the submarginal line of dots. Length of the body 5 lines; of the wings 12 lines.

a. Australia. From Mr. Damel's collection.
