= Androchela =

Scientific classification
- Kingdom: Animalia
- Phylum: Arthropoda
- Class: Insecta
- Order: Lepidoptera
- Family: Geometridae
- Tribe: Nacophorini
- Genus: Androchela; McQuillan, 1996

Genus of geometer moths

Androchela is a genus of moths in the family Geometridae erected by Peter B. McQuillan in 1996.

== Species ==
- Androchela milvaria Guenée, [1858]
- Androchela newmannaria Guenée, [1858]
- Androchela smithi McQuillan, 1996
