= Ceratonyx =

Scientific classification
- Kingdom: Animalia
- Phylum: Arthropoda
- Class: Insecta
- Order: Lepidoptera
- Family: Geometridae
- Tribe: Nacophorini
- Genus: Ceratonyx; Guenée, 1857

Genus of moths

Ceratonyx is a genus of moths in the family Geometridae.

== Species ==
- Ceratonyx arizonensis (Capps, 1950)
- Ceratonyx permagnaria (Grossbeck, 1912)
- Ceratonyx satanaria Guenée, 1857
