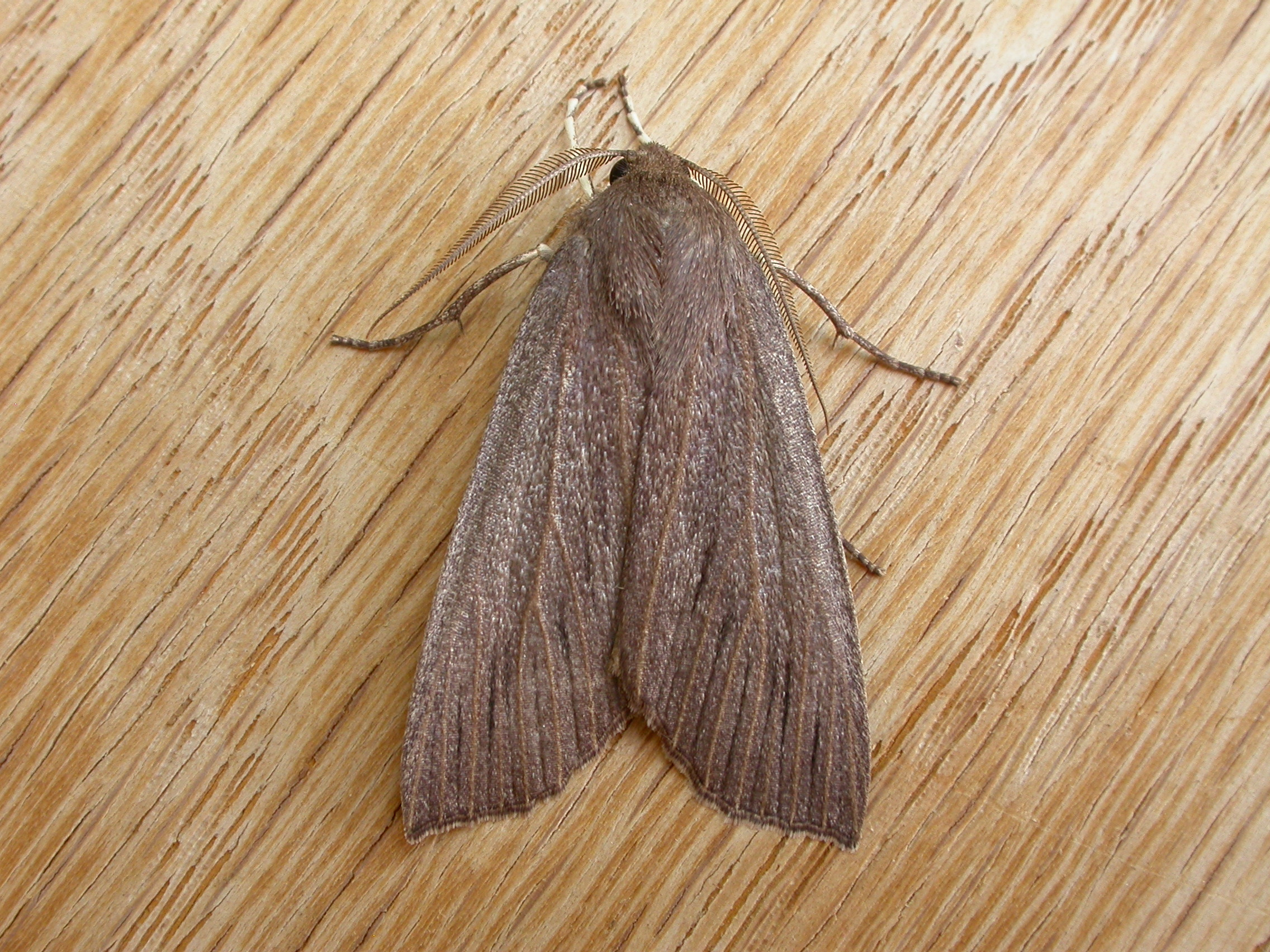

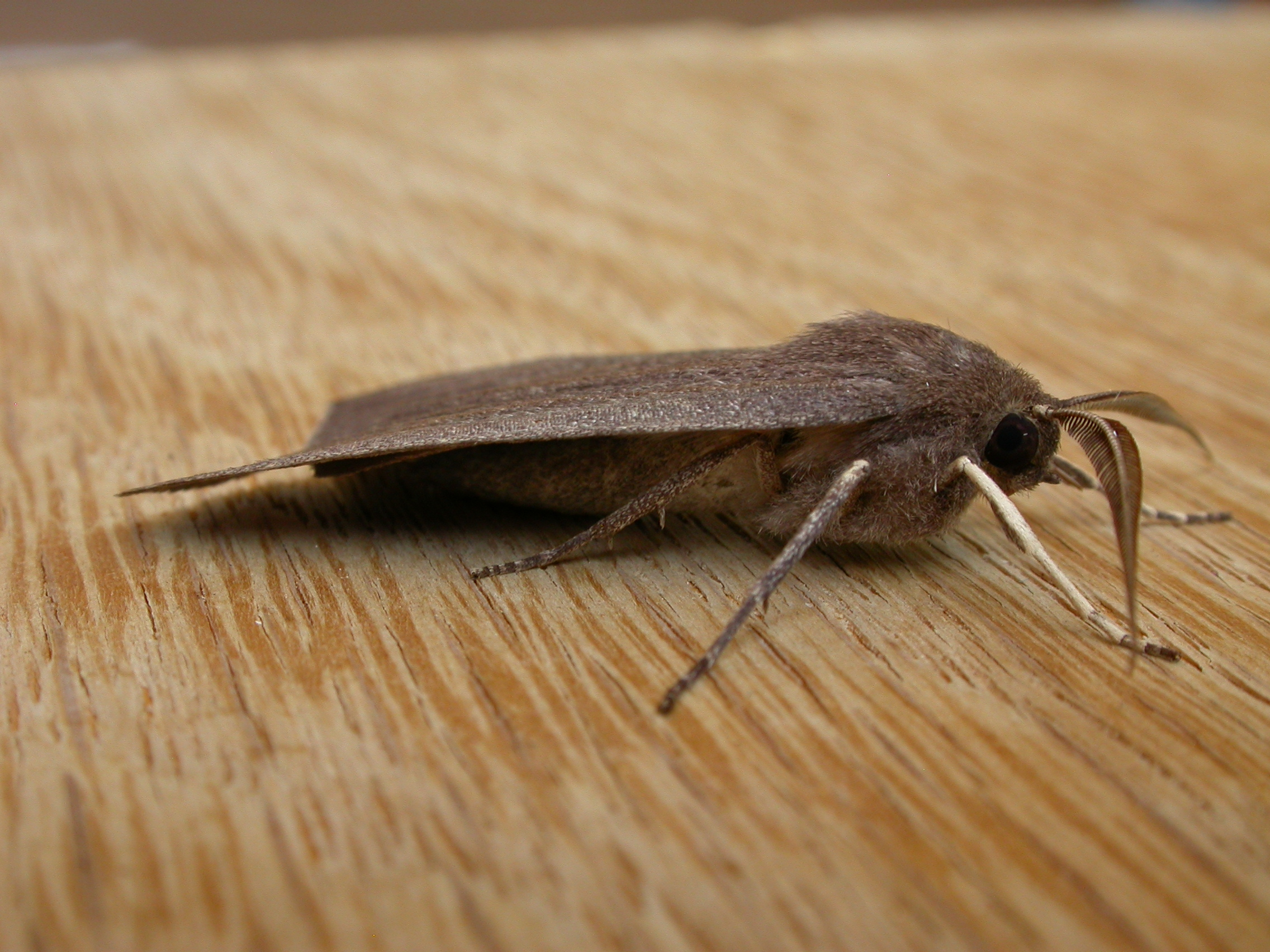

Scientific classification
- Kingdom: Animalia
- Phylum: Arthropoda
- Class: Insecta
- Order: Lepidoptera
- Family: Geometridae
- Tribe: Nacophorini
- Genus: Palleopa; Walker, 1866
- Species: P. innotata

Binomial name
- Palleopa innotata (Walker, 1866)

Synonyms
- Generic; Nyctilampes Goldfinch, 1944; Specific; Nyctilampes funerea Goldfinch, 1944

= Palleopa =

Genus of moths

Palleopa is a monotypic moth genus in the family Geometridae. Its only species, Palleopa innotata, the finely-streaked crest-moth, is known from Australia, including Tasmania. Both the genus and species were first described by Francis Walker in 1866.
