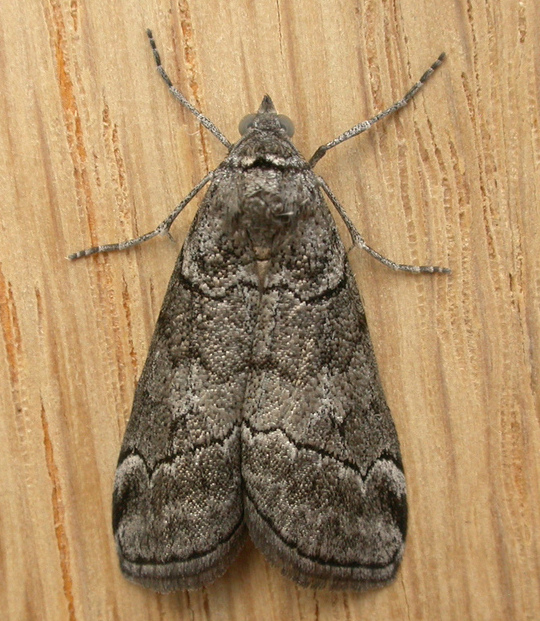

Scientific classification
- Kingdom: Animalia
- Phylum: Arthropoda
- Clade: Pancrustacea
- Class: Insecta
- Order: Lepidoptera
- Family: Geometridae
- Tribe: Nacophorini
- Genus: Corula; Walker, 1856
- Species: C. geometroides

Binomial name
- Corula geometroides Walker, 1856

Synonyms
- Lathaeolis spodochroa Turner, 1936; Aedemon eurapta Turner, 1944

= Corula =

Genus of moths

Corula is a monotypic genus of moths in the family Geometridae. Its only species, Corula geometroides, the ash-grey geometrid, is found in Australia. Both the genus and species were first described by Francis Walker in 1856.
