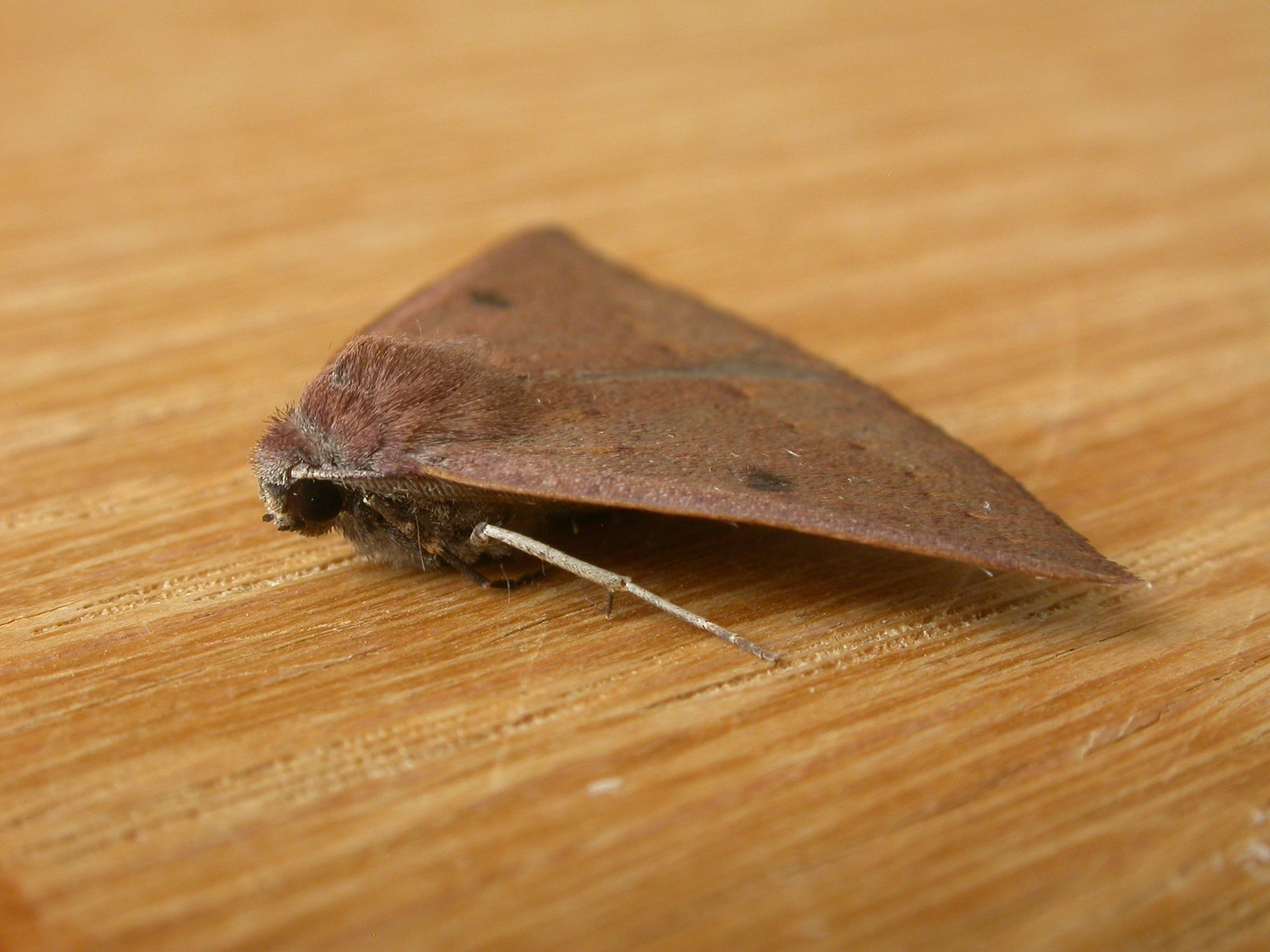

Scientific classification
- Domain: Eukaryota
- Kingdom: Animalia
- Phylum: Arthropoda
- Class: Insecta
- Order: Lepidoptera
- Family: Geometridae
- Genus: Amelora
- Species: A. oenobreches

Binomial name
- Amelora oenobreches Turner, 1919

= Amelora oenobreches =

Species of moth

Amelora oenobreches is a moth of the family Geometridae. It is found in Australia.
