= Archephanes =

Scientific classification
- Kingdom: Animalia
- Phylum: Arthropoda
- Class: Insecta
- Order: Lepidoptera
- Family: Geometridae
- Tribe: Nacophorini
- Genus: Archephanes; Turner, 1926

Genus of moths

Archephanes is a genus of moths in the family Geometridae with a single species.

== Species ==
- Archephanes zalosema Turner, 1926
