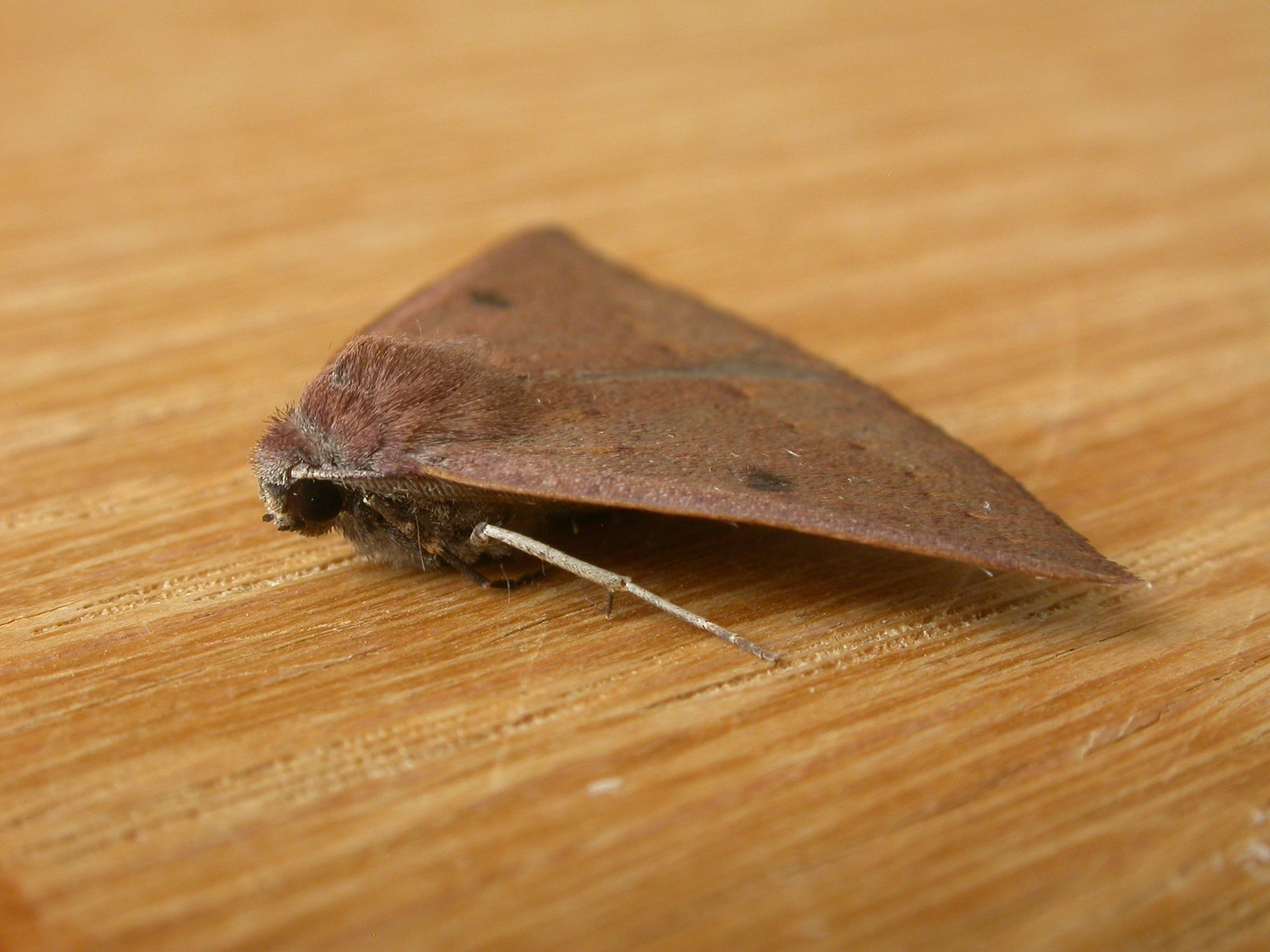
- Amelora oenobreches

Scientific classification
- Kingdom: Animalia
- Phylum: Arthropoda
- Class: Insecta
- Order: Lepidoptera
- Family: Geometridae
- Tribe: Nacophorini
- Genus: Amelora; Guest, 1887

= Amelora =

Genus of geometer moths

Amelora is a genus of moths in the Lepidopteran family Geometridae. Members of the reside in either South Africa or Australia.

For more precise taxonomy, the genus belongs to the Subfamily Ennominae, within which they have recently been suggested to belong to the tribe Diptychini rather than Nacophorini.

== Species ==
- Amelora acontistica (Turner, 1947)
- Amelora adusta Turner, 1947
- Amelora amblopa Guest, 1887
- Amelora anepiscepta Turner, 1947
- Amelora arotraea Meyrick, 1892
- Amelora australis (Rosenstock, 1885)
- Amelora belemnophora Turner, 1947
- Amelora camptodes] Turner, 1919
- Amelora catacris Meyrick, 1892
- Amelora ceraunia Turner, 1947
- Amelora conia Turner, 1947
- Amelora crenulata Turner, 1926
- Amelora cryphia Turner, 1919
- Amelora crypsigramma Lower, 1899
- Amelora demistis Guest, 1887
- Amelora fucosa Turner, 1919
- Amelora goniota Guest, 1887
- Amelora gonosemela (Lower, 1893)
- Amelora idiomorpha Lower, 1893
- Amelora leucaniata (Guenée, 1857)
- Amelora lithopepla Lower, 1918
- Amelora macarta Turner, 1919
- Amelora mesocapna Turner, 1919
- Amelora milvaria (Guenée, 1857)
- Amelora newmannaria (Guenée, 1857)
- Amelora oenobreches Turner, 1919
- Amelora oncerodes Turner, 1919
- Amelora oritropha Turner, 1919
- Amelora pachyspila Turner, 1919
- Amelora pentheres Turner, 1919
- Amelora perinipha (Lower, 1915)
- Amelora petrochroa (Lower, 1897)
- Amelora polychroa Lower, 1907
- Amelora sparsularia (Guenée, 1857)
- Amelora suffusa Turner, 1926
- Amelora synclera Turner, 1919
- Amelora syscia (Turner, 1919)
- Amelora thegalea Turner, 1947
- Amelora zophopasta Turner, 1919
