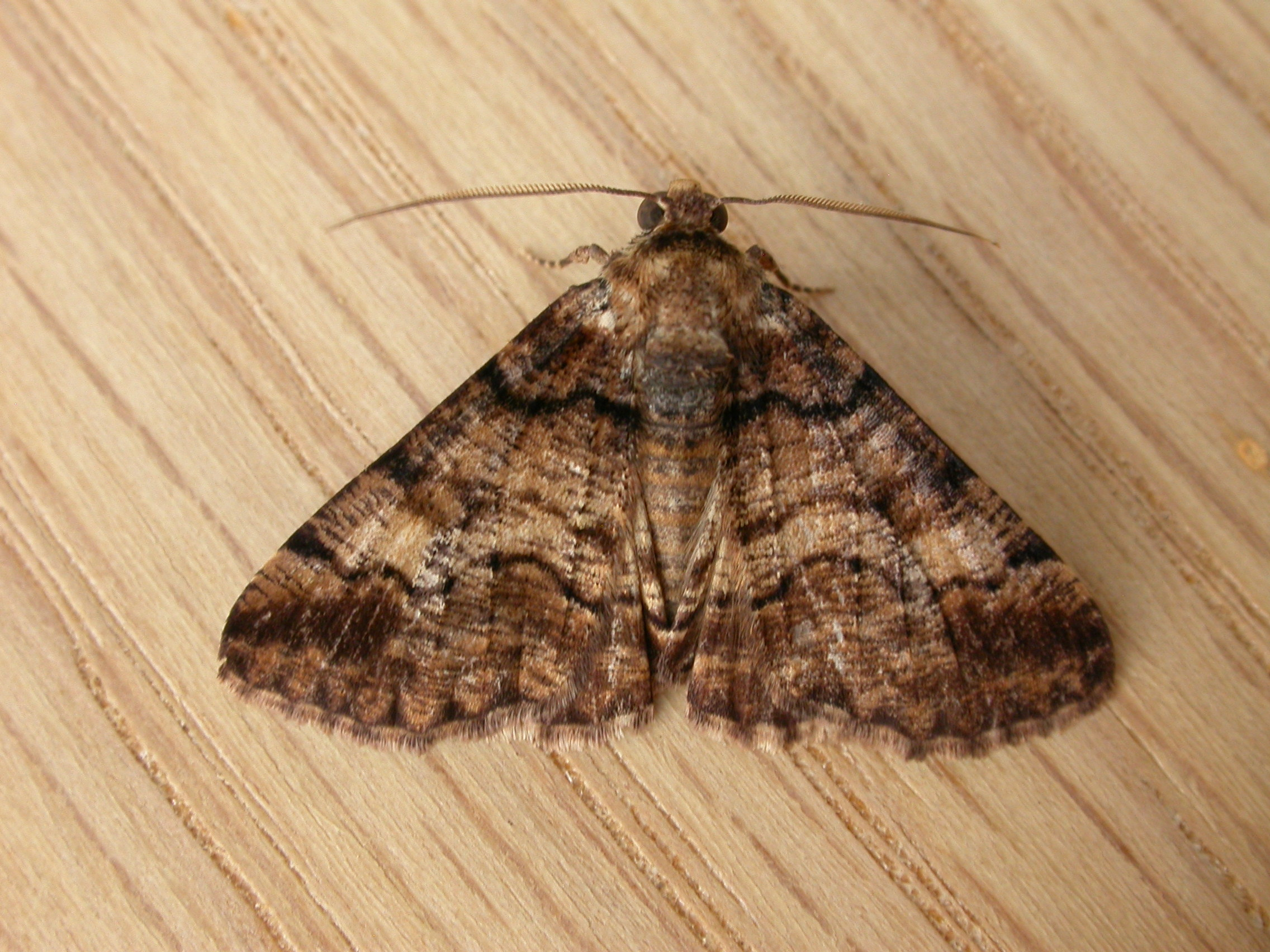

Scientific classification
- Kingdom: Animalia
- Phylum: Arthropoda
- Clade: Pancrustacea
- Class: Insecta
- Order: Lepidoptera
- Family: Geometridae
- Subfamily: Ennominae
- Tribe: Nacophorini
- Genus: Cryphaea; Turner, 1947
- Species: C. xylina

Binomial name
- Cryphaea xylina (Turner, 1917)

Synonyms
- Heteroptila xylina Turner, 1917

= Cryphaea xylina =

Species of moth

Cryphaea is a monotypic moth genus in the family Geometridae. Its single species, Cryphaea xylina, is found in Australia. The species was first described by Turner in 1917.
