= Chlenomorpha =

Scientific classification
- Domain: Eukaryota
- Kingdom: Animalia
- Phylum: Arthropoda
- Class: Insecta
- Order: Lepidoptera
- Family: Geometridae
- Tribe: Nacophorini
- Genus: Chlenomorpha; Lower, 1918

Genus of moths

Chlenomorpha is a genus of moths in the family Geometridae.

== Species ==
- Chlenomorpha lygdina (Turner, 1917)
- Chlenomorpha sciogramma Lower, 1918
- Chlenomorpha trisyneura (Lower, 1903)
