= Authaemon =

Scientific classification
- Kingdom: Animalia
- Phylum: Arthropoda
- Class: Insecta
- Order: Lepidoptera
- Family: Geometridae
- Tribe: Nacophorini
- Genus: Authaemon; Turner, 1919

Genus of moths

Authaemon is a genus of moths in the family Geometridae.

== Species ==
- Authaemon poliophara Turner, 1919
- Authaemon purpurea Goldfinch, 1944
- Authaemon stenonipha Turner, 1919
