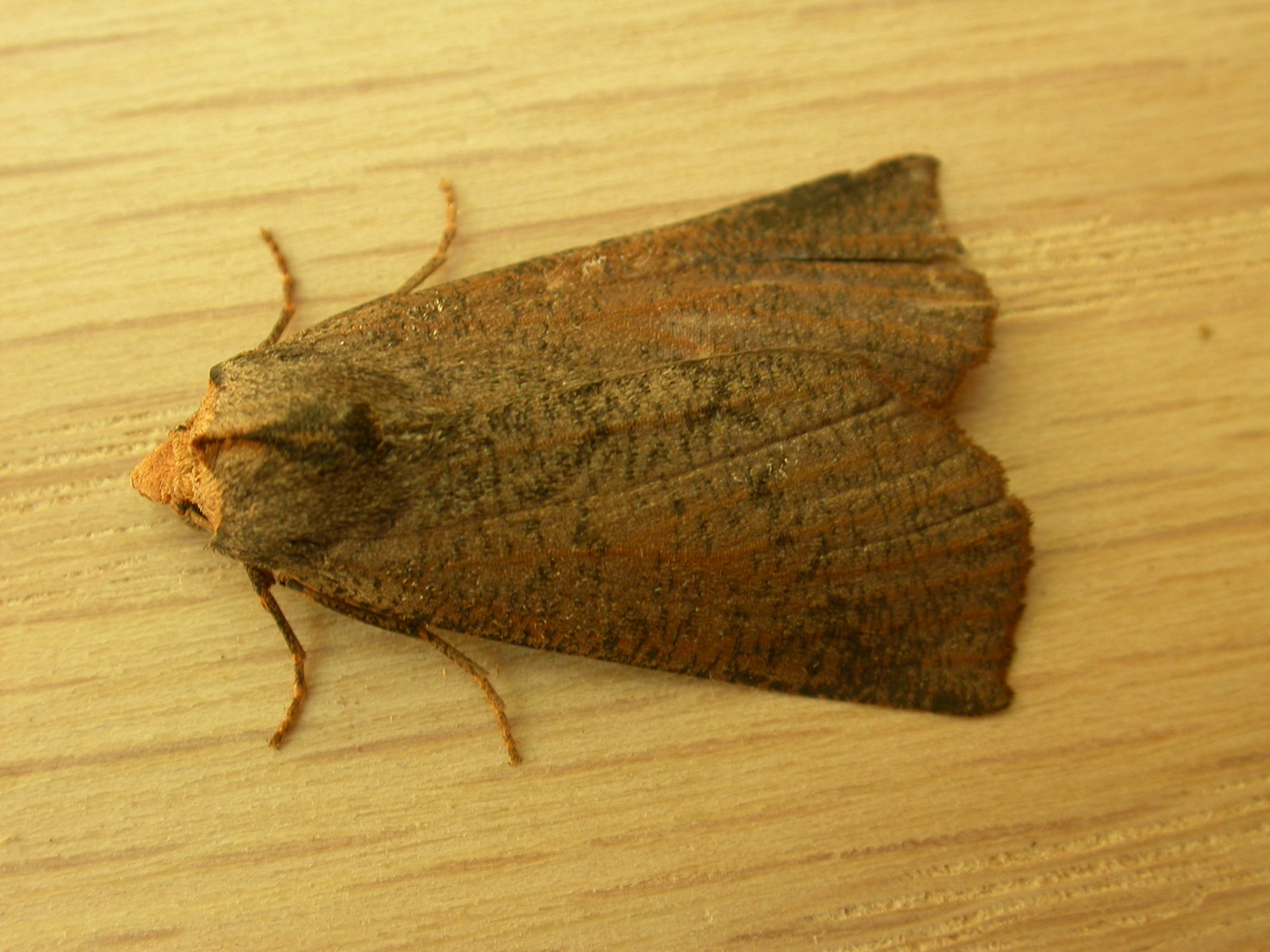

Scientific classification
- Domain: Eukaryota
- Kingdom: Animalia
- Phylum: Arthropoda
- Class: Insecta
- Order: Lepidoptera
- Family: Geometridae
- Genus: Fisera
- Species: F. eribola

Binomial name
- Fisera eribola Guest, 1887

Synonyms
- Criomacha eribola

= Fisera eribola =

Species of moth

Fisera eribola, the orange-hooded crest-moth, is a species of moth of the family Geometridae. It was described by Edward Guest in 1887 and it is found in Australia.

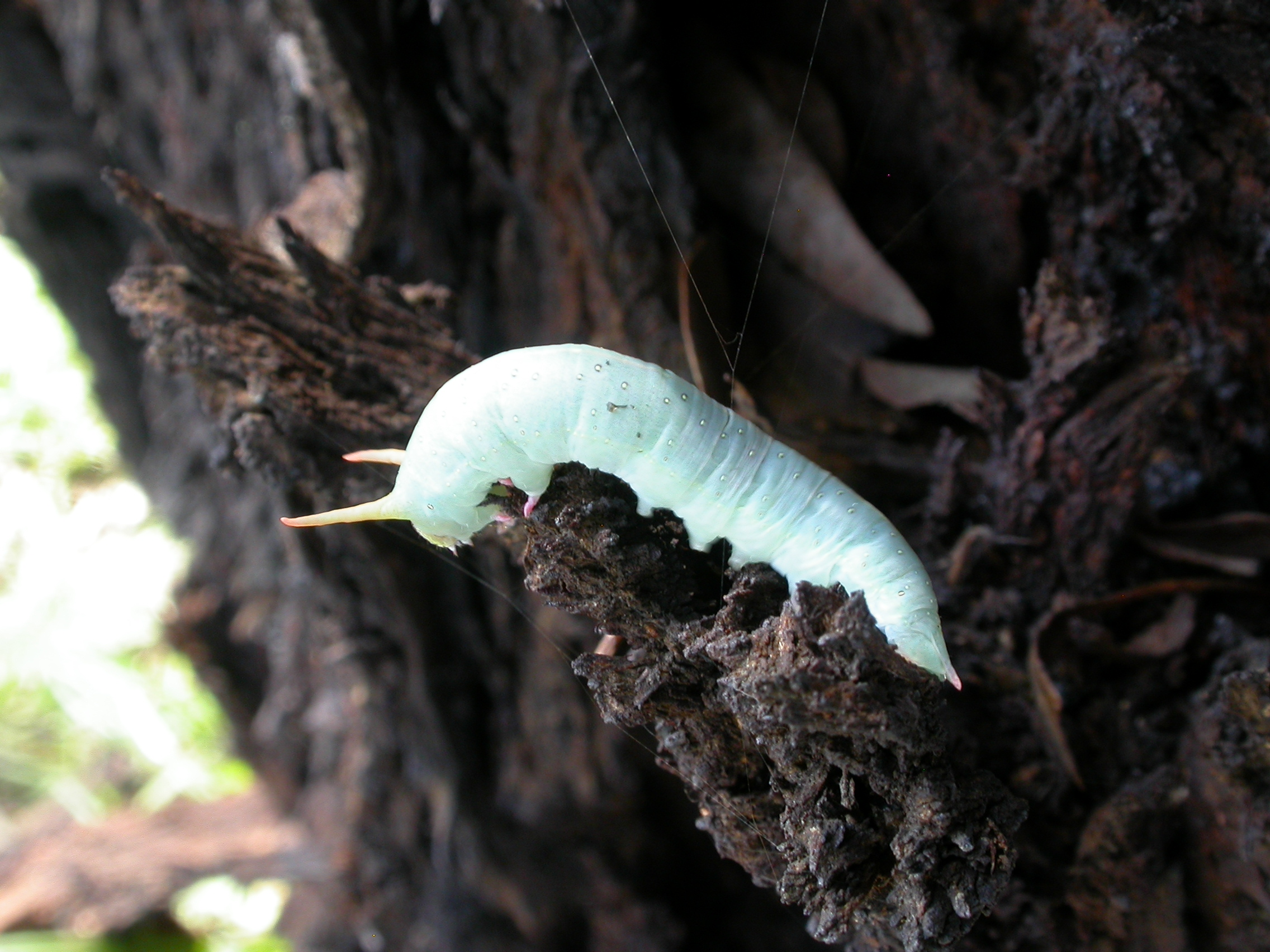
Larva

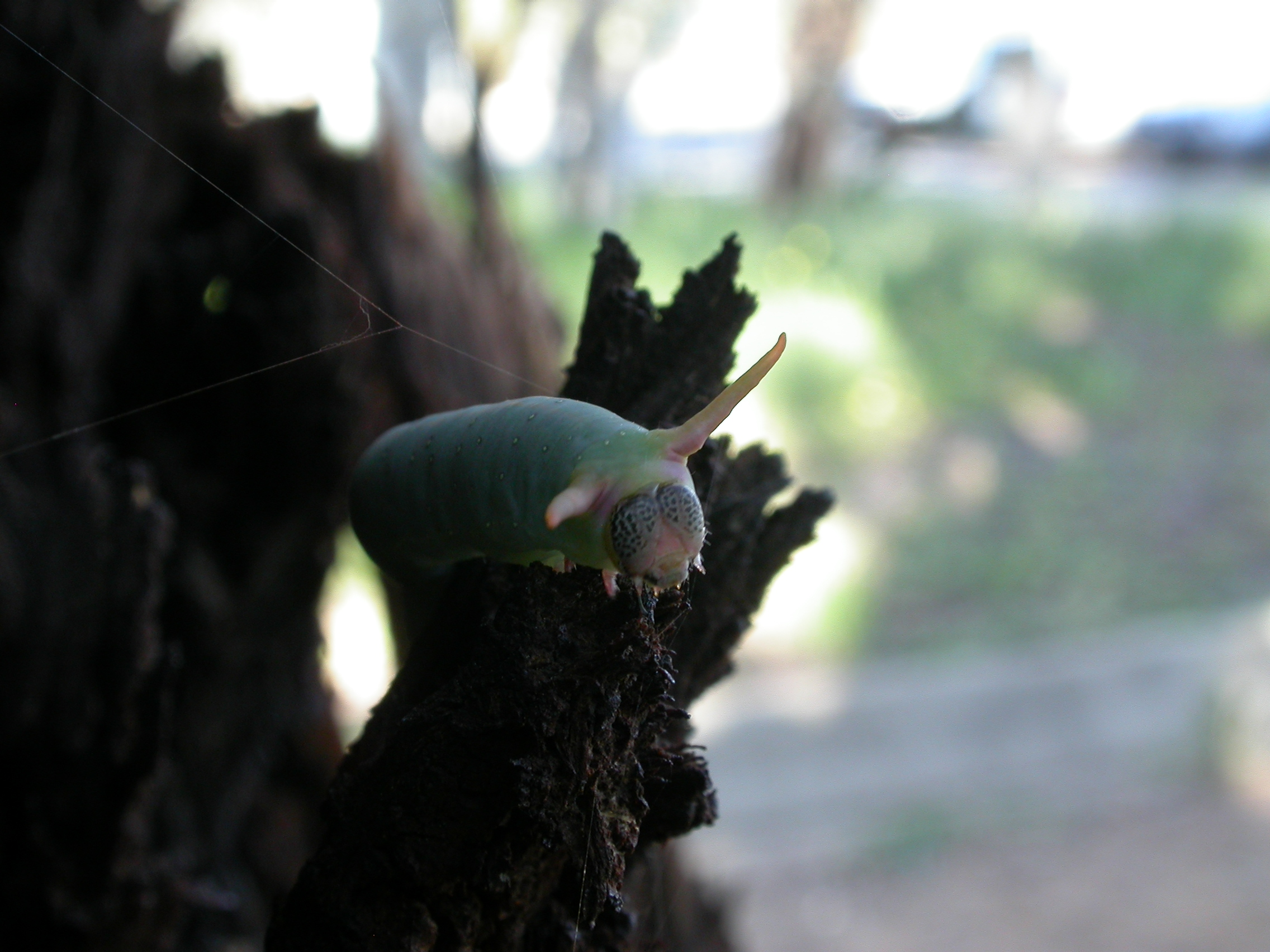
Larva
