= Betulodes =

Scientific classification
- Kingdom: Animalia
- Phylum: Arthropoda
- Class: Insecta
- Order: Lepidoptera
- Family: Geometridae
- Tribe: Nacophorini
- Genus: Betulodes; Thierry-Mieg, 1904

Genus of moths

Betulodes is a genus of moths in tribe Nacophorini of the family Geometridae. Members of the genus occur in South America and in southern North America, where they do not occur north of Mexico.

== Description ==
Adults of Betulodes species are large with a sturdy build. They have broad forewings with blunt apices, brown in color with variable amounts of white or cream-colored mottling; hindwings with a postmedial wavy line; small to moderate abdominal tufts in longitudinal rows; and double pairs of spurs on the hind tibia. They are sexually dimorph, with females larger than males (female forewing length 37–49 mm; male 24–30 mm) and possessing more extensive mottling on the wings.

== Species ==
- Betulodes antennatissima (Dyar, 1916)
- Betulodes crebraria (Guenée, [1858])
- Betulodes euriceraea Rindge, 1961
- Betulodes matharma (Druce, 1892)
- Betulodes morenoi Herbulot, 1979
