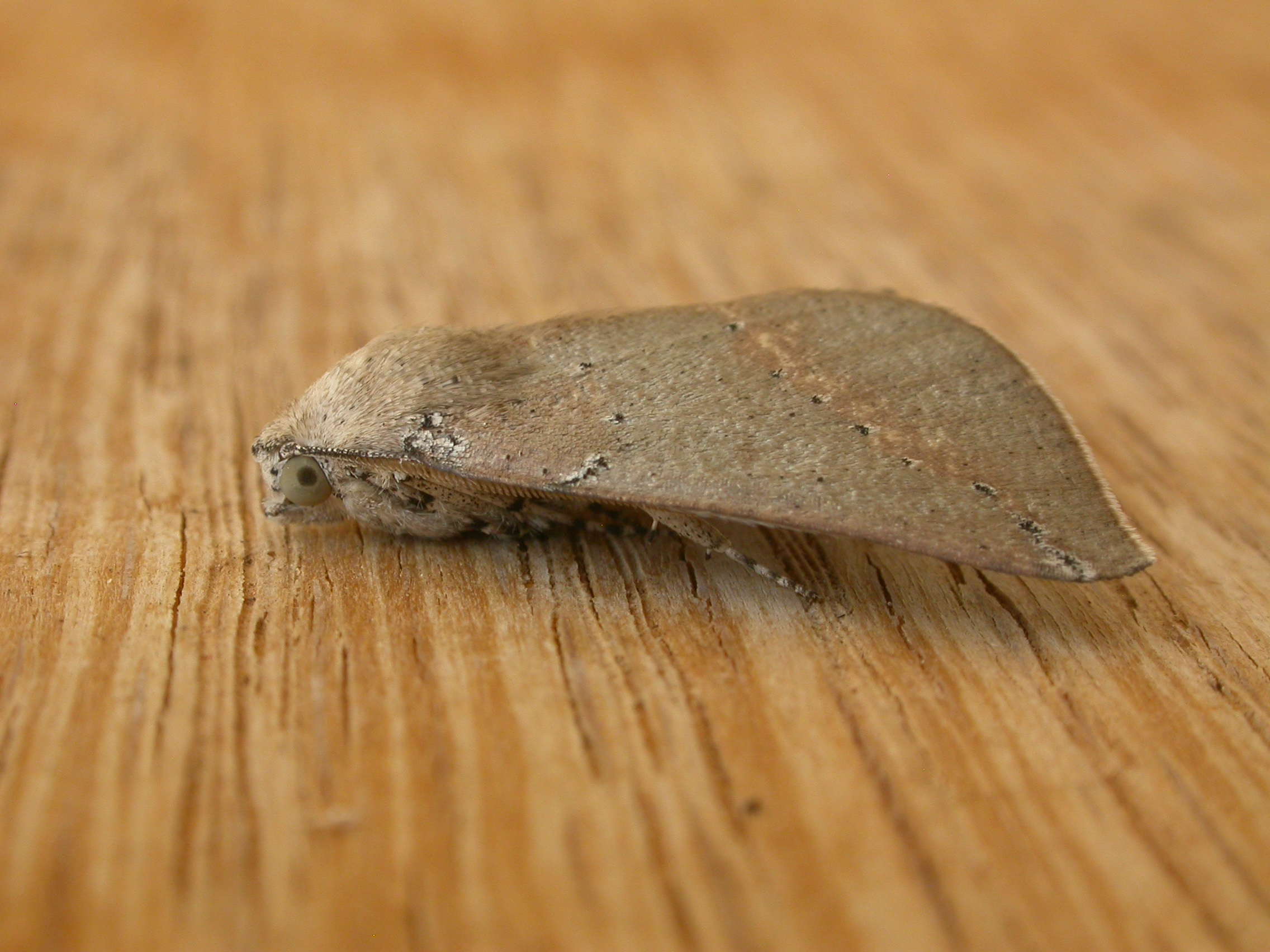

Scientific classification
- Domain: Eukaryota
- Kingdom: Animalia
- Phylum: Arthropoda
- Class: Insecta
- Order: Lepidoptera
- Family: Geometridae
- Genus: Amelora
- Species: A. macarta

Binomial name
- Amelora macarta Turner, 1919

Synonyms
- Cassythaphaga macarta (Turner, 1919)

= Amelora macarta =

Species of moth

Amelora macarta is a moth of the family Geometridae. It is found in the Australian Capital Territory and Tasmania.
