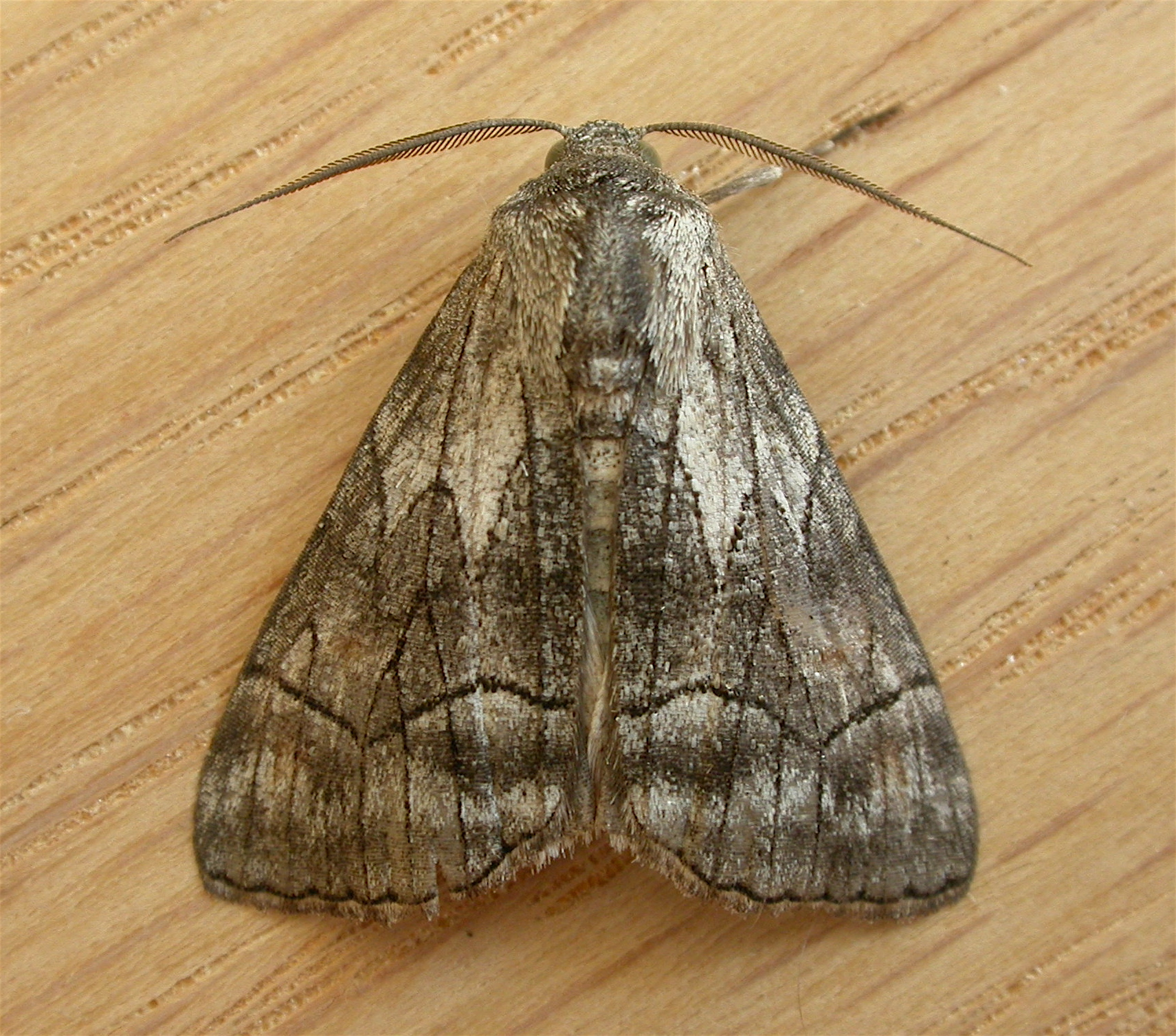
- Stibaroma melanotoxa

Scientific classification
- Domain: Eukaryota
- Kingdom: Animalia
- Phylum: Arthropoda
- Class: Insecta
- Order: Lepidoptera
- Family: Geometridae
- Tribe: Nacophorini
- Genus: Stibaroma; Guest, 1887

= Stibaroma =

Genus of moths

Stibaroma is a genus of moths in the family Geometridae described by Edward Guest in 1887. Both species are known from Australia.

== Species ==
- Stibaroma melanotoxa Guest, 1887
- Stibaroma aphronesa (Lower, 1902)
