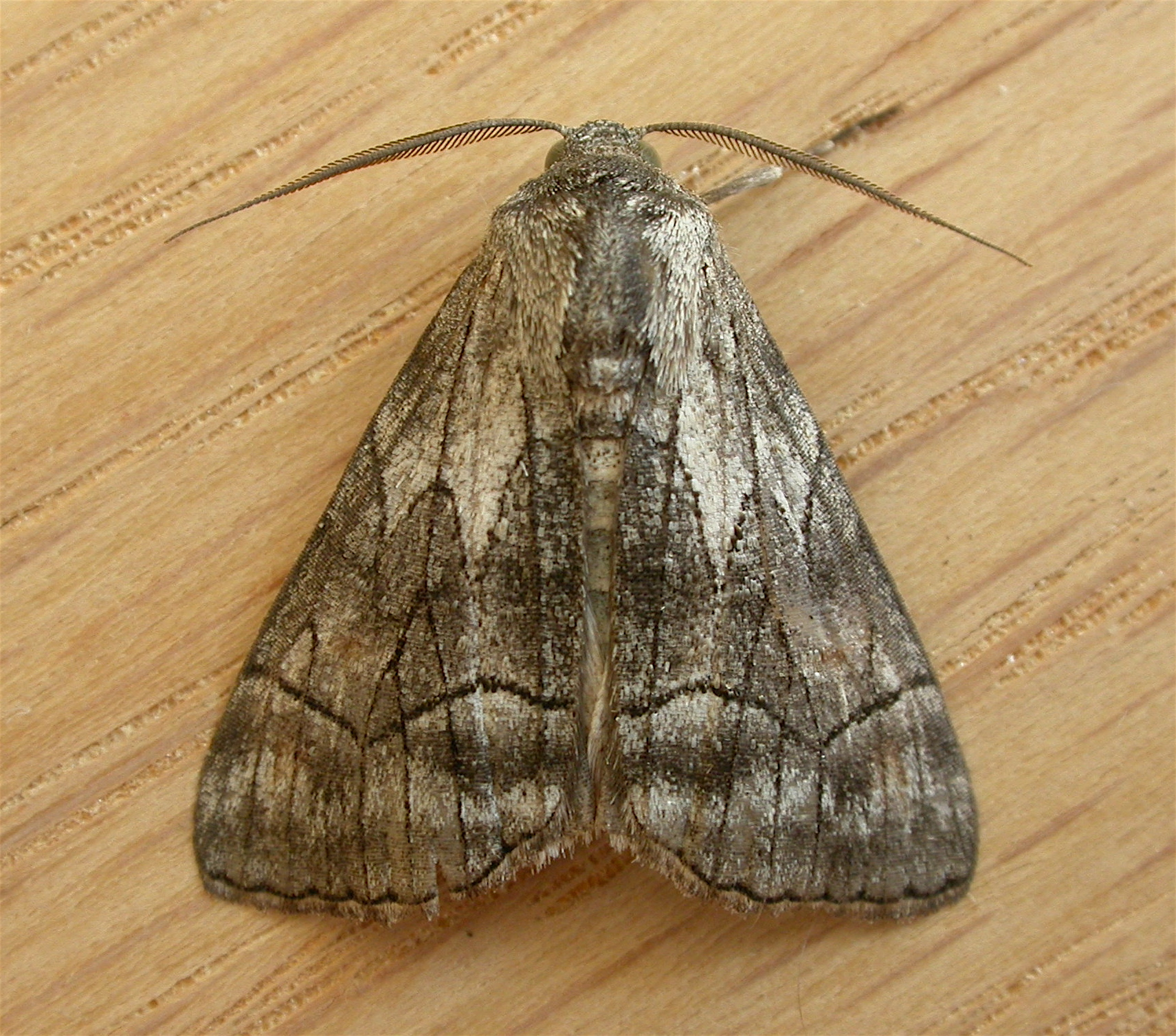

Scientific classification
- Domain: Eukaryota
- Kingdom: Animalia
- Phylum: Arthropoda
- Class: Insecta
- Order: Lepidoptera
- Family: Geometridae
- Genus: Stibaroma
- Species: S. melanotoxa

Binomial name
- Stibaroma melanotoxa Guest, 1887

= Stibaroma melanotoxa =

Species of moth

Stibaroma melanotoxa, the grey-caped line-moth, is a species of moth of the family Geometridae first described by Edward Guest in 1887. It is found in Australia.

== Description ==
The original description by Guest, done on a male specimen, mentions "a handsome, silvery-grey moth". There is a narrow but sharply defined black line, very acutely angled outwards, one-fourth of the way along the forewing. There is another line three-fourths of the way along, and this is broader and less acutely angled. Beyond this second line is a dark blackish smear. The hindwing is silvery-white with a dark broad border.

According to a more recent description, the undersides of all wings are silver with broad black bands along the margins. Females are similar to males except for the basal line on each forewing being less jagged, and a slightly larger size (female wingspan ~4 cm, male wingspan ~3.5 cm).

Larvae of S. melanotoxa grow up to 4 cm in length, are rough in appearance and range from orange to red-brown in colour. There may be four black bands around the body. Abdominal segments 2, 3 and 8 each have a pair of small dorsal horns. The first pair of prolegs is absent and the next two pairs are reduced.

== Behaviour ==
Larva of this species feed nocturnally on leaves of Eucalyptus species. During the daytime, they either stretch out and press against a stem, or loop the front part of the body such that the head and thorax lie on top of the abdomen.

== Life cycle ==
The life cycle of S. melanotoxa has been studied in Melbourne, Australia. Females captured in April proceed to lay eggs in rows along leaf edges. Eggs hatch after about 18 days into larvae. Larvae initiate pupation in early August. Adults emerge from pupae seven months later in February of the following year.

== Gallery ==
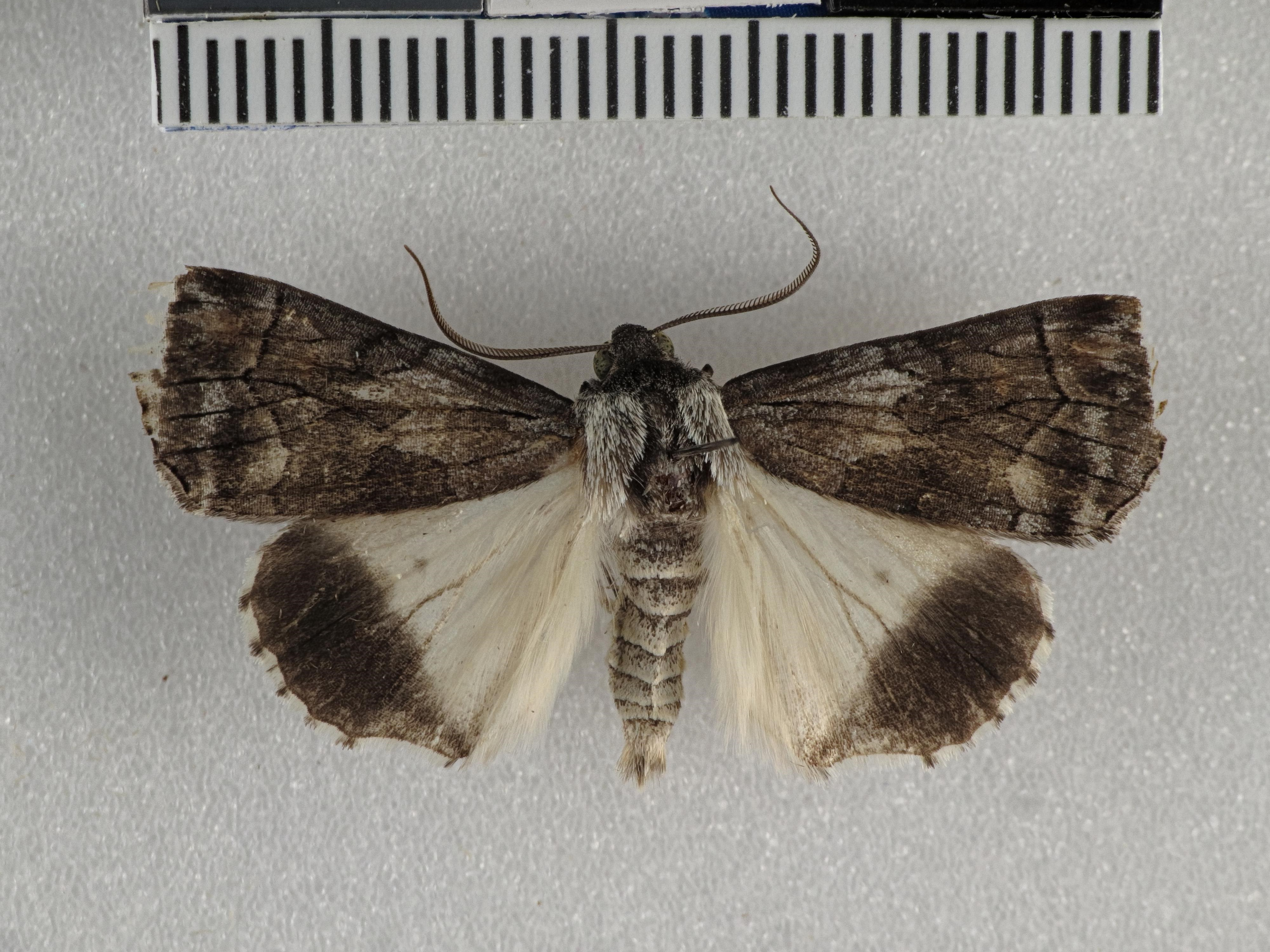
Male with wings spread

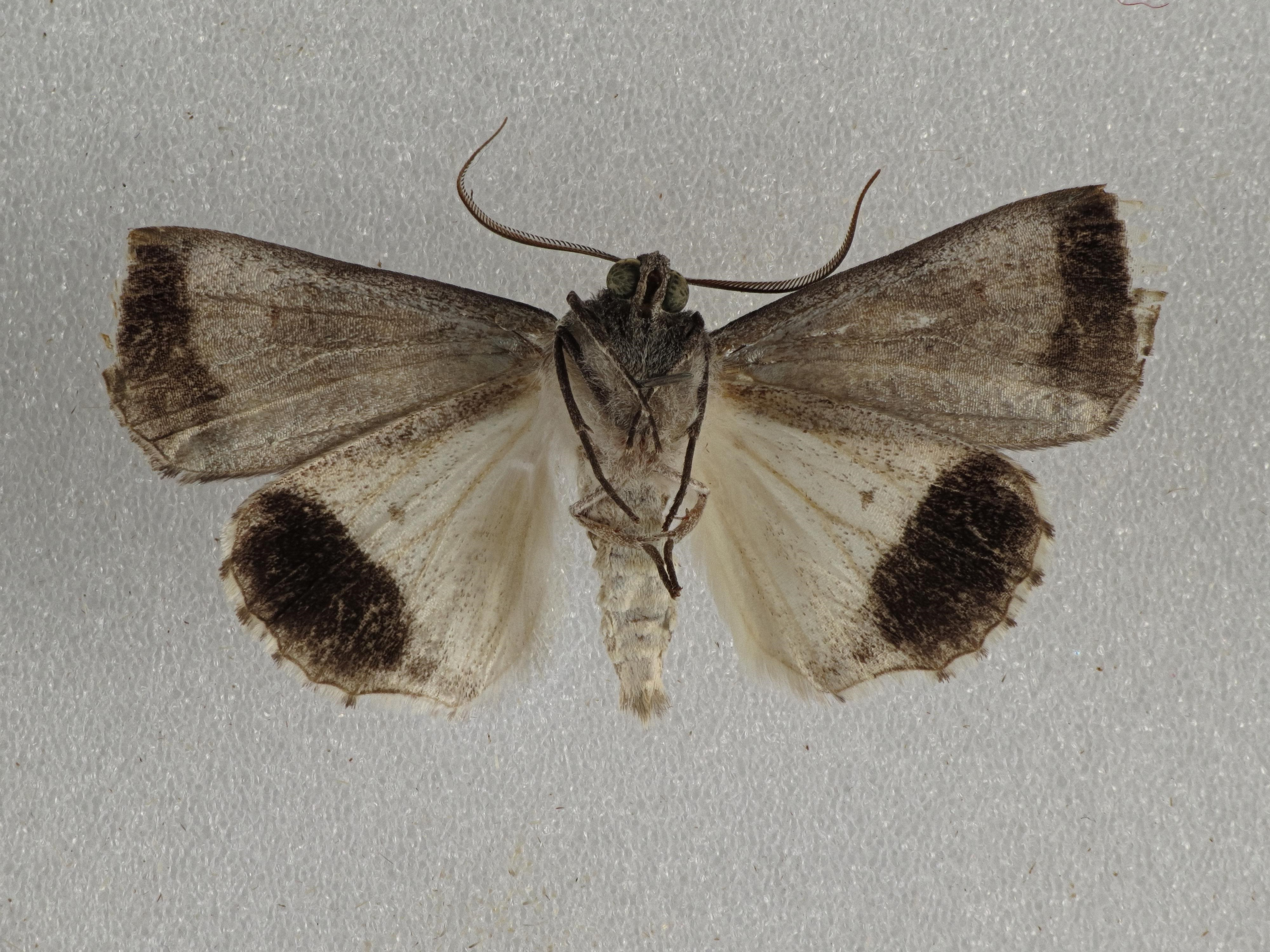
Underside of the previous specimen
