= Ceratonyx permagnaria =

Scientific classification
- Domain: Eukaryota
- Kingdom: Animalia
- Phylum: Arthropoda
- Class: Insecta
- Order: Lepidoptera
- Family: Geometridae
- Genus: Ceratonyx
- Species: C. permagnaria

Binomial name
- Ceratonyx permagnaria (Grossbeck, 1912)

Species of moth

Ceratonyx permagnaria is a species of geometrid moth in the family Geometridae. It is found in North America.

The MONA or Hodges number for Ceratonyx permagnaria is 6779.
