= Archephanes zalosema =

Scientific classification
- Domain: Eukaryota
- Kingdom: Animalia
- Phylum: Arthropoda
- Class: Insecta
- Order: Lepidoptera
- Family: Geometridae
- Genus: Archephanes
- Species: A. zalosema

Binomial name
- Archephanes zalosema Turner, 1926

Species of moth

Archephanes zalosema is a medium-sized moth in the family Geometridae that is native to Australia. The species was first described by Alfred Jefferis Turner in 1926. Its wings are green and marbled with black in a way that makes them look like lichen. It has a wingspan of 4 centimeters. It has back wings, hidden when resting, that have a pale brown colour. Underneath the wings is a pale brown colour. The antennae of Archephanes zalosema are not branched. Typical of sexual dimorphism among Lepidoptera the male is smaller than the female.

== Habitat ==
Archephanes zalosema lives in sub-alpine areas where the mountain pepper grows such as Tasmania. The larva eats mountain pepper.

== Life cycle ==
The eggs are laid in spring on the underside of the mountain pepper leaves. Approximately 60 eggs are laid. When the larva hatches it eats the leaves around it. The larvae are either green with pink stripes or red with pink and green stripes. These colours help the larva camouflage on the leaf of the mountain pepper. When it becomes an adult it is nocturnal and flies in the summer and autumn.
