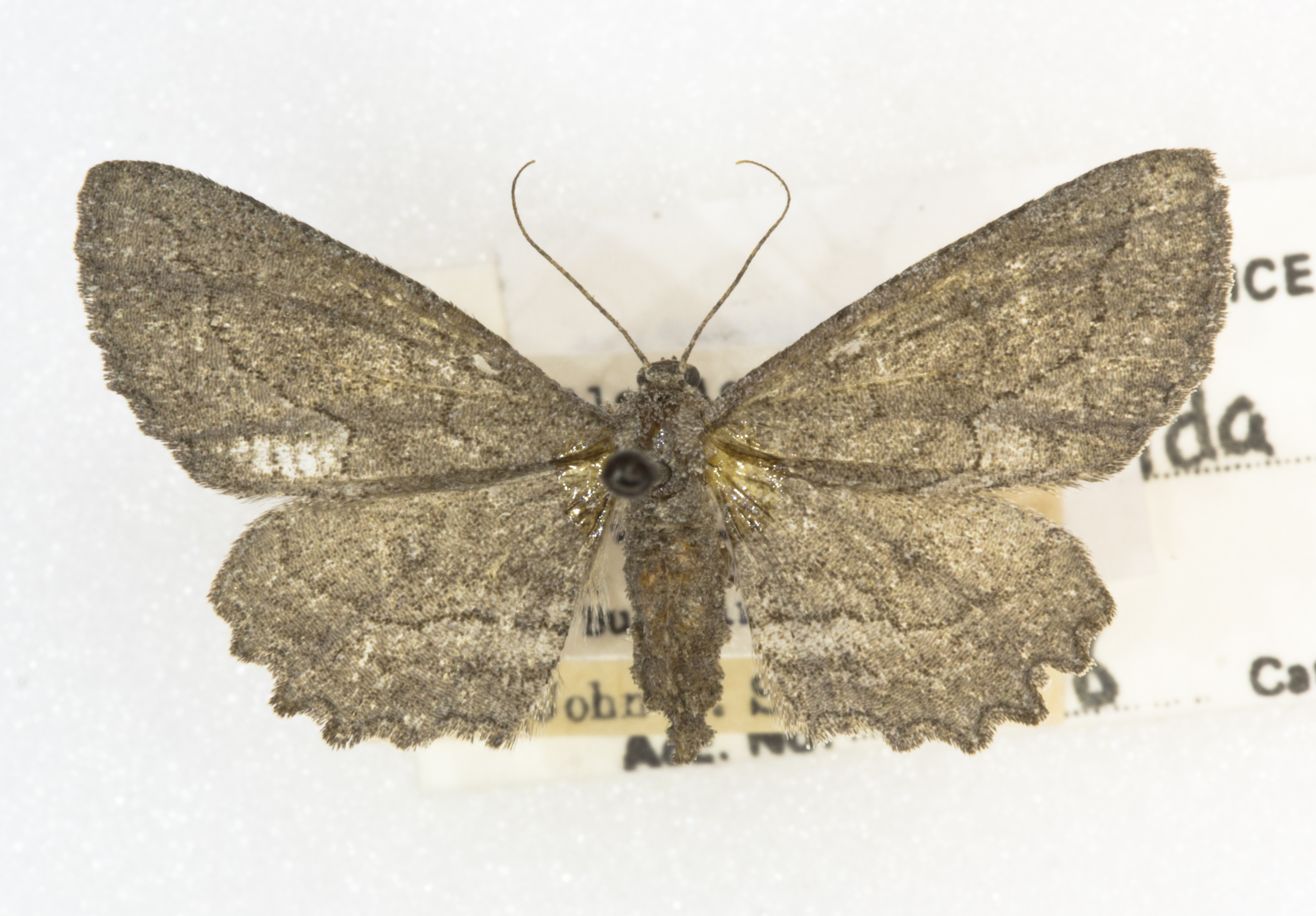

Scientific classification
- Kingdom: Animalia
- Phylum: Arthropoda
- Clade: Pancrustacea
- Class: Insecta
- Order: Lepidoptera
- Family: Geometridae
- Tribe: Nacophorini
- Genus: Aethaloida; McDunnough, 1920
- Species: A. packardaria

Binomial name
- Aethaloida packardaria (Hulst, 1888)

Synonyms
- Generic: Aethalodes Hulst, 1896; Specific: Hulstina packardaria Hulst, 1888; Selidosema lachrymosa Hulst, 1898; Selidosema homopteroides Hulst, 1900

= Aethaloida =

Genus and species of geometer moth

Aethaloida is a monotypic moth genus in the family Geometridae erected by James Halliday McDunnough in 1920. Its only species, Aethaloida packardaria, was first described by George Duryea Hulst in 1888. It is found in the US state of California.

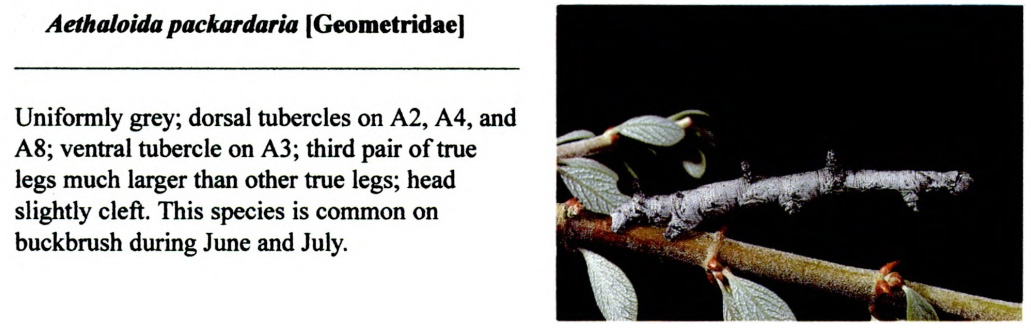
Aethaloida packardria caterpillar
