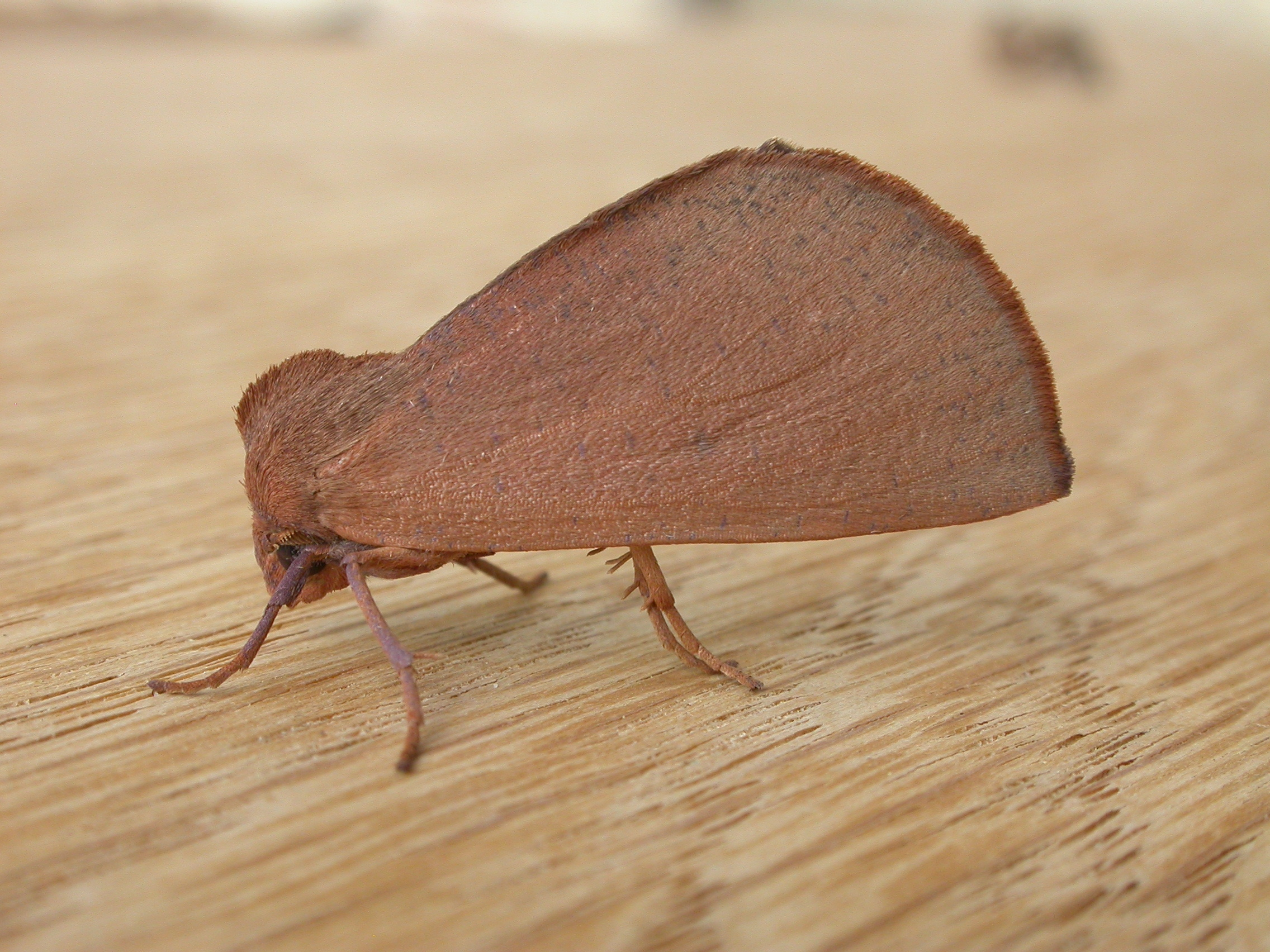

Scientific classification
- Kingdom: Animalia
- Phylum: Arthropoda
- Class: Insecta
- Order: Lepidoptera
- Family: Geometridae
- Genus: Fisera
- Species: F. perplexata

Binomial name
- Fisera perplexata Walker, 1860

= Fisera perplexata =

Species of moth

Fisera perplexata, the light-tan crest-moth, is a moth of the family of moth species Geometridae first described by Francis Walker in 1860. It is found in Australia.

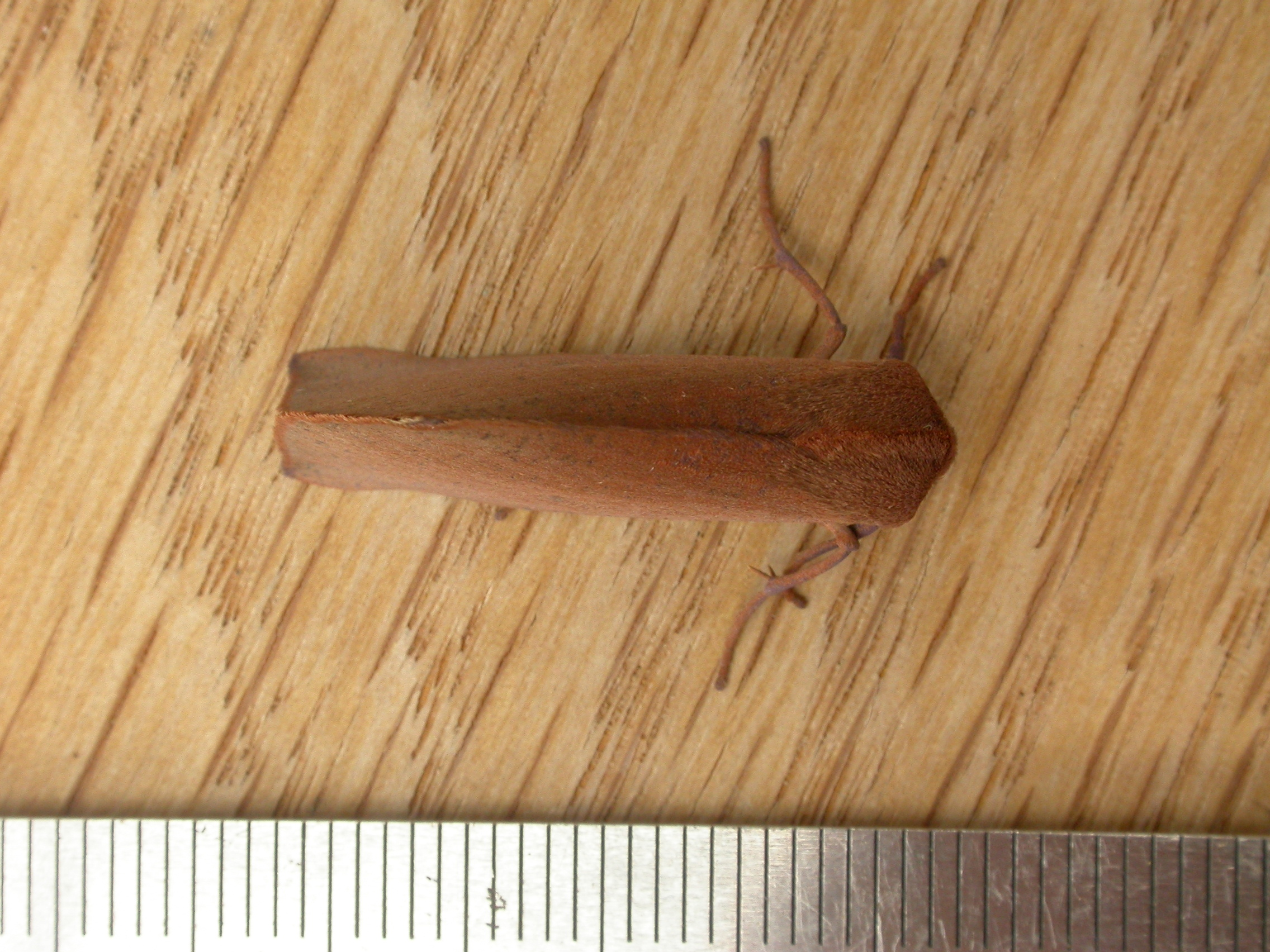
