= Universidad del Aconcagua =

Argentina educational centre

Coordinates: 32.889917°S 68.836417°W

Aconcagua University
- Universidad del Aconcagua
- Motto: Spiritus Litteram Vivificat
- Type: Private
- Established: 1965 as the Instituto Superior de la Empresa. Became Aconcagua University in 1968.
- Rector: Dr. Osvaldo S. Caballero
- Students: 2,762 (2005)
- Location: Catamarca 147; 5500 - Mendoza; Argentina, Mendoza, Argentina
- Campus: Urban
- Website: uda.edu.ar

The Universidad del Aconcagua (English: Aconcagua University), generally known as UDA, is a non-profit private university founded in 1965. It is located in the city of Mendoza, Argentina.

== Academic units ==
- School of Social Sciences
  - Business Administration
  - International Commerce
  - Commercialization
  - Graphic Design
  - Publicity
  - Computing
  - Software
  - Telecommunications
  - Institutional Relations
  - Health Administration
- School of Medicine
  - Medicine
  - Obstetrics
  - Speech-language pathology
  - Physical Education
- School of Economics and Law
  - Accounting
  - Economics
  - Law
  - Notary
- School of Psychology
  - Psychology
  - Psychopedagogy
  - Criminology
  - Citizen Security
- School of Languages
  - English
  - English Translation
