= Archiearides =

Scientific classification
- Kingdom: Animalia
- Phylum: Arthropoda
- Class: Insecta
- Order: Lepidoptera
- Family: Geometridae
- Subfamily: Archiearinae
- Genus: Archiearides; D. S. Fletcher, 1953

Genus of moths

Archiearides is a genus of moths in the family Geometridae described by David Stephen Fletcher in 1953.
