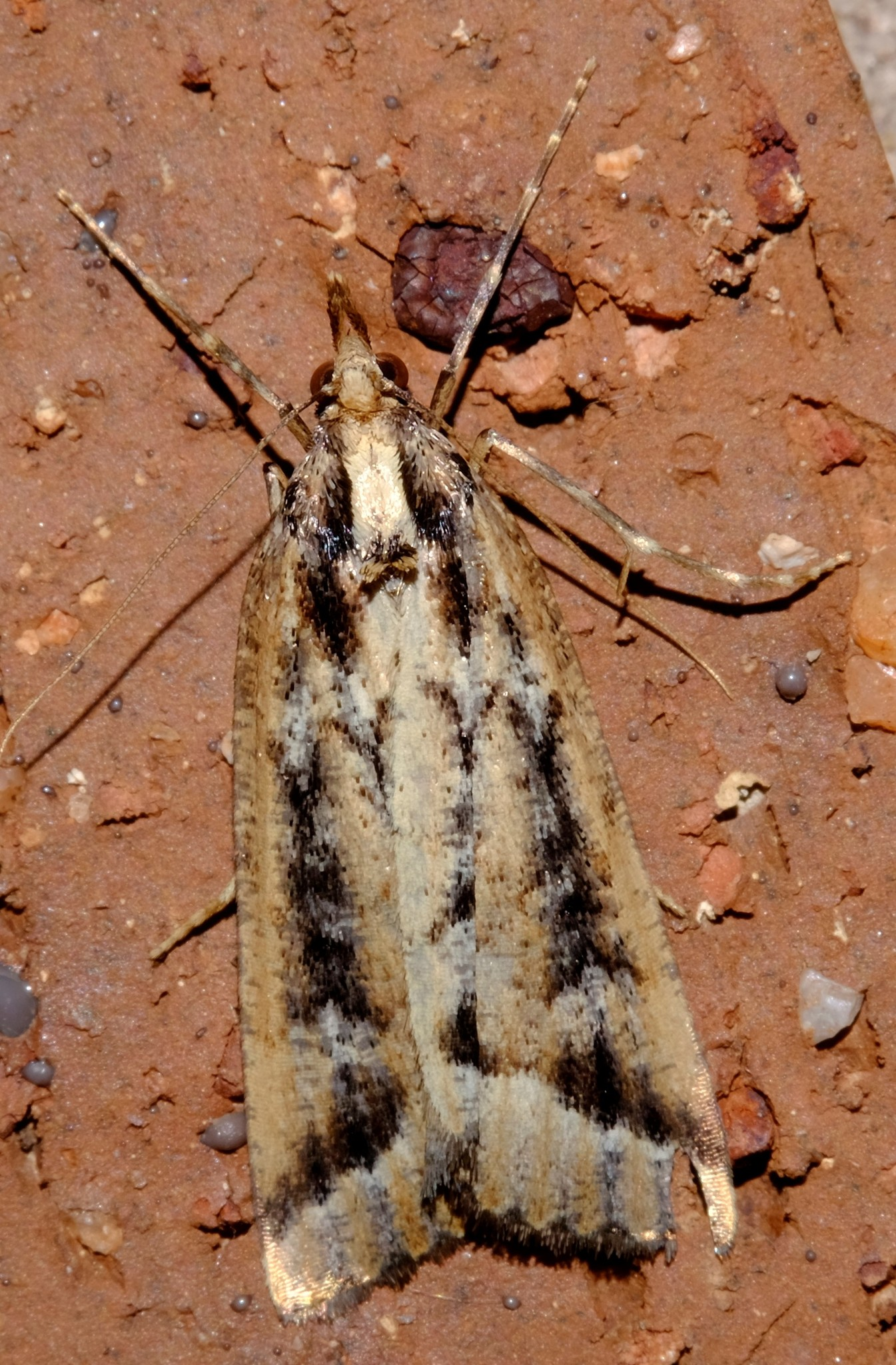
- Conosara castanea

Scientific classification
- Kingdom: Animalia
- Phylum: Arthropoda
- Class: Insecta
- Order: Lepidoptera
- Family: Geometridae
- Subfamily: Ennominae
- Genus: Conosara; Meyrick, 1892

= Conosara =

Genus of moths

Conosara is a genus of moths in the family Geometridae.

== Species ==
- Conosara castanea Meyrick, 1892
- Conosara pammicta Turner, 1919
