= Dirce (moth) =

Scientific classification
- Kingdom: Animalia
- Phylum: Arthropoda
- Clade: Pancrustacea
- Class: Insecta
- Order: Lepidoptera
- Family: Geometridae
- Subfamily: Archiearinae
- Genus: Dirce; Prout, 1910

Genus of moths

Dirce is a genus of moths in the family Geometridae.

== Species ==
- Dirce aesiodora Turner, 1922
- Dirce lunaris (Meyrick, 1890)
- Dirce oriplancta Turner, 1926
- Dirce solaris (Meyrick, 1890)
