= Caenosynteles =

Scientific classification
- Kingdom: Animalia
- Phylum: Arthropoda
- Class: Insecta
- Order: Lepidoptera
- Family: Geometridae
- Genus: Caenosynteles; Dyar, 1912
- Species: C. haploaria

Binomial name
- Caenosynteles haploaria Dyar, 1912

Genus of moths

Caenosynteles is a monotypic moth genus in the family Geometridae. Its only species, Caenosynteles haploaria, is found in Mexico. Both the genus and species were described by Harrison Gray Dyar Jr. in 1912.
