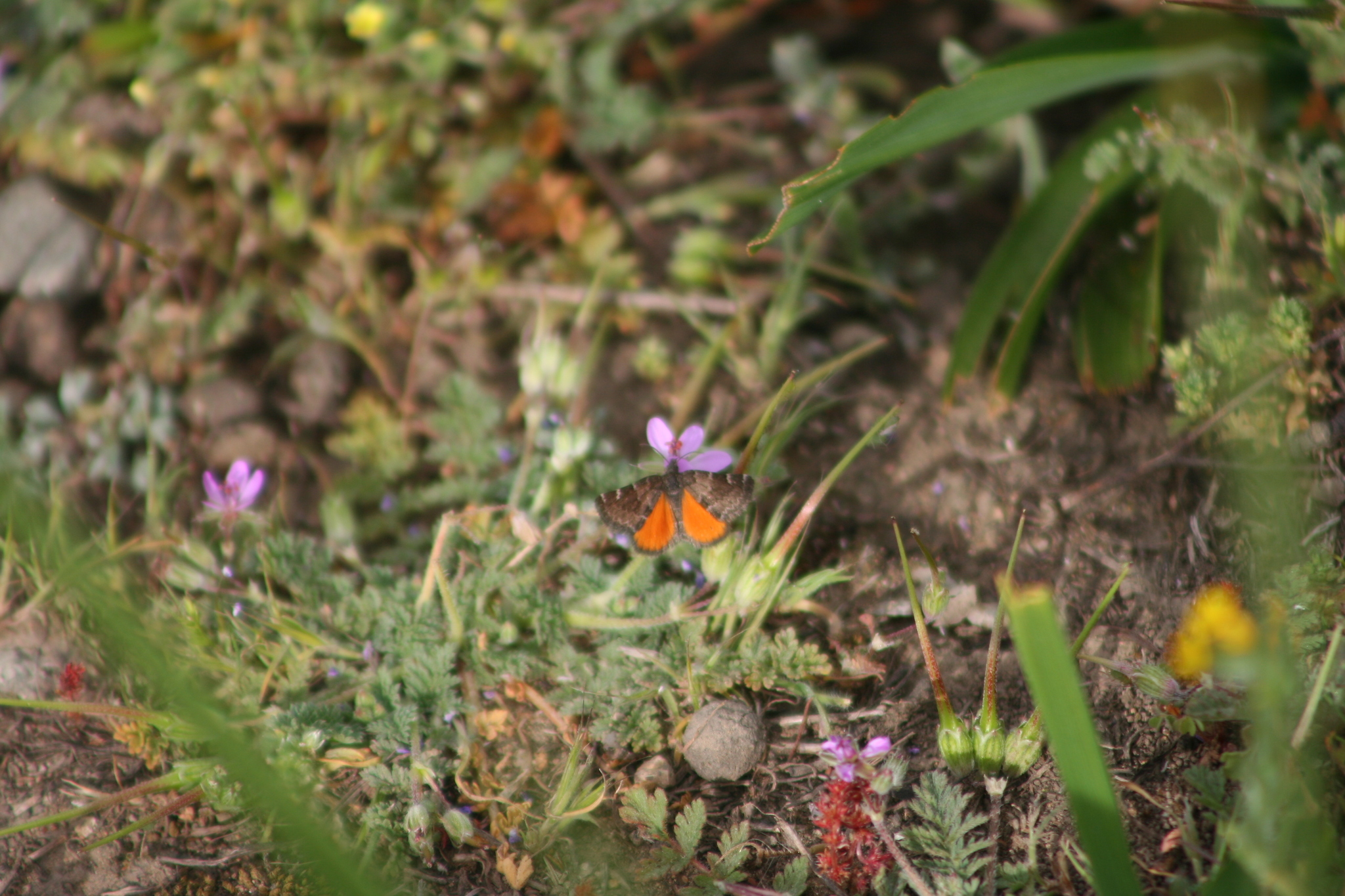

Scientific classification
- Kingdom: Animalia
- Phylum: Arthropoda
- Class: Insecta
- Order: Lepidoptera
- Family: Geometridae
- Genus: Lachnocephala; D. S. Fletcher, 1953
- Species: L. vellosata

Binomial name
- Lachnocephala vellosata D. S. Fletcher, 1953

= Lachnocephala =

Genus of moths

Lachnocephala is a monotypic moth genus in the family Geometridae described by David Stephen Fletcher in 1953. Its only species, Lachnocephala vellosata, known from Chile, was described by the same author in the same year.
