= Oratha =

Scientific classification
- Kingdom: Animalia
- Phylum: Arthropoda
- Class: Insecta
- Order: Lepidoptera
- Family: Geometridae
- Genus: Oratha; Walker, 1863

Type species
- Oratha significata Walker, 1863

Genus of moths

Oratha is a genus of moths in the family Geometridae erected by Francis Walker in 1863.
