= Acalyphes =

Scientific classification
- Kingdom: Animalia
- Phylum: Arthropoda
- Clade: Pancrustacea
- Class: Insecta
- Order: Lepidoptera
- Family: Geometridae
- Subfamily: Archiearinae
- Genus: Acalyphes; Turner, 1926
- Species: A. philorites

Binomial name
- Acalyphes philorites Turner, 1926

Monotypic genus of geometer moths

Acalyphes is a monotypic moth genus in the family Geometridae. Its single species, Acalyphes philorites, is found in Australia, where it feeds on pencil pine (Athrotaxis cupressoides). Both the genus and species were first described by Alfred Jefferis Turner in 1926.
