= Aconcagua (moth) =

Scientific classification
- Kingdom: Animalia
- Phylum: Arthropoda
- Class: Insecta
- Order: Lepidoptera
- Family: Geometridae
- Tribe: Nacophorini
- Genus: Aconcagua; Rindge, 1983

Genus of geometer moths

Aconcagua is a genus of moths in the family Geometridae first described by Rindge in 1983.

== Species ==
- Aconcagua aculeata Rindge, 1975
- Aconcagua crebra Rindge, 1975
- Aconcagua fessa Rindge, 1975
