= List of geometrid genera: T =

The very large moth family Geometridae contains genera beginning with A, B, C, D, E, F, G, H, I, J, K, L, M, N, O, P, Q, R, S, T, U, V, W, X, Y and Z.

Those beginning with T include:

- Tachychlora
- Tachyphyle
- Tacparia
- Taeniogramma
- Taeniophila
- Talca
- Talledega
- Tamurhydrelia
- Tanagridia
- Tanaoctenia
- Tanaorhinus
- Tanaotrichia
- Tapinogyna
- Tarachia
- Taraxineura
- Tarma
- Tasta
- Tatosoma
- Taxeotis
- Taxilepis
- Teinocladia
- Teinoloba
- Telenomeuta
- Telletrurona
- Telotheta
- Tephrina
- Tephrinopsis
- Tephroclystia
- Tephronia
- Terenodes
- Terina
- Terpnidia
- Tescalsia
- Tesiophora
- Tessarotis
- Tetracis
- Tetragonodes
- Tetraspidoptera
- Thalaina
- Thalainodes
- Thalassodes
- Thalera
- Thalerura
- Thallogama
- Thallophaga
- Thamnocausta
- Thaumatographe
- Thelycera
- Thenopa
- Theoxena
- Thera
- Therapis
- Theria
- Thersana
- Thetidia
- Thinopteryx
- Thiopsyche
- Thoyowpongia
- Thrasychlora
- Threneta
- Thyridesia
- Thyrinteina
- Thysanochilus
- Thysanoctena
- Thysanopyga
- Thysanotricha
- Tigridoptera
- Timana
- Timandra
- Timandromorpha
- Tineigidia
- Tmetomorpha
- Togarioides
- Tolmera
- Tomopteryx
- Tora
- Tornos
- Tosaura
- Toulgoetia
- Toxogrammia
- Toxopaltes
- Tracheops
- Traina
- Traminda
- Trepidina
- Tricentra
- Tricentrogyna
- Tricentroscelis
- Trichobaptria
- Trichochlamys
- Trichoclada
- Trichoclystis
- Trichodezia
- Trichogompha
- Trichoplites
- Trichopterigia
- Trichopteryx
- Trichorrhages
- Trichosterrha
- Trichostichia
- Trichozoma
- Triglavia
- Trigonomelia
- Trigonoptila
- Trigrammia
- Trilobignophos
- Trimeresia
- Trimetopia
- Triorisma
- Triphosa
- Triprora
- Tripteridia
- Triptila
- Triptiloides
- Trirachopoda
- Tristeirometa
- Tristrophis
- Trisyndeta
- Tritocleis
- Trizodes
- Trochiodes
- Trochistis
- Tropicollesis
- Trotocalpe
- Trotocraspeda
- Trotogonia
- Trotopera
- Trygodes
- Tshimganitia
- Tuerckheimia
- Tycoonia
- Tyloptera
- Tympanota
