= Tarma (disambiguation) =

Tarma may refer to:

== Places ==
- Tarma, a city in Junín Region, Peru
- Tarma District, Peru
- Tarma Province, Peru
- Tarma, Kentucky, United States
- Roman Catholic Diocese of Tarma, in the Ecclesiastical province of Huancayo in Peru
- Tarma (crater)

== Other uses ==
- Tarma (moth), a genus of moth in the family Geometridae
