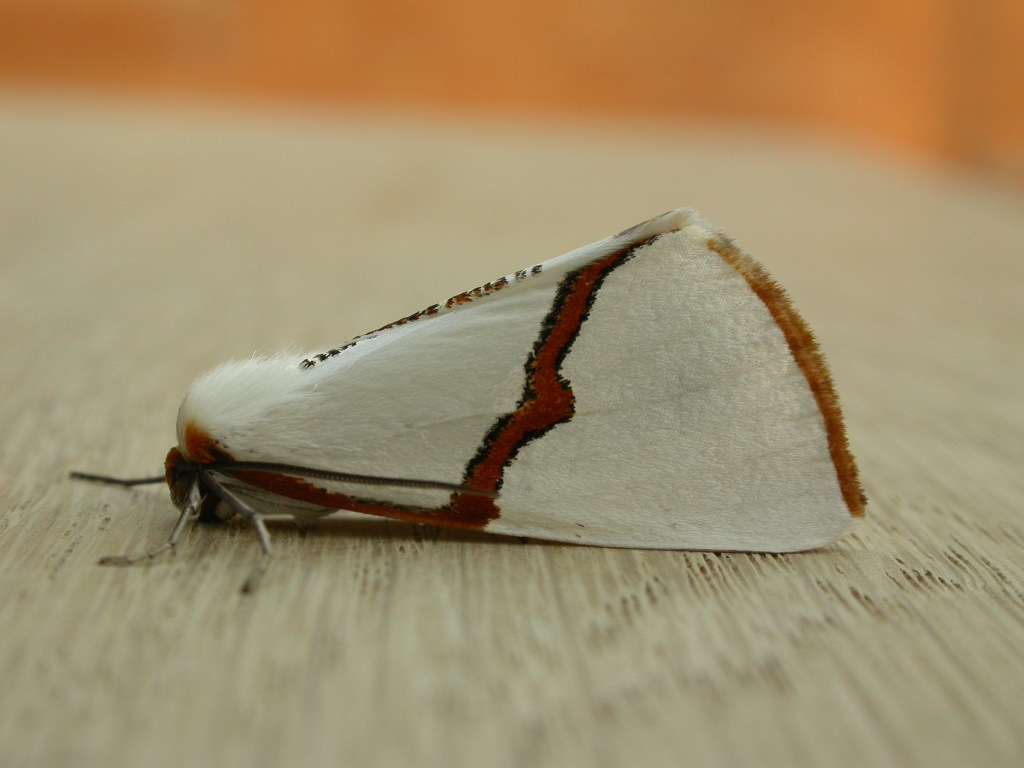

Scientific classification
- Kingdom: Animalia
- Phylum: Arthropoda
- Clade: Pancrustacea
- Class: Insecta
- Order: Lepidoptera
- Family: Geometridae
- Genus: Thalaina
- Species: T. selenaea

Binomial name
- Thalaina selenaea Doubleday, 1845

Synonyms
- Absytes magnificaria

= Thalaina selenaea =

Species of moth

Thalaina selenaea, the orange-rimmed satin moth, is a moth of the family Geometridae. The species was first discovered by Henry Doubleday in 1845. It is found throughout eastern Australia, including Tasmania. Although the common name satin moth is sometimes used for this species, that name is already applied to Leucoma salicis, an unrelated species native to Europe and Asia.

== Description ==
The wingspan is about 5 cm. The wings are mainly white, with the costa being a rusty brown. Some southern specimens exhibit a rust-colored stripe running diagonally down each forewing. They have a brown and orange spot on the undersurface of each hindwing which may be visible on the upper surface. Caterpillars are distinguished from Thalaina clara because they lack the wavy outline and rings present in Thalaina clara. The caterpillars are a light green with long sparse black hairs and a red spot behind the head. They grow up to 4 cm. The pupa is dark green with a brown abdomen, but later becomes fully brown.

== Distribution and habitat ==
It is found across much of Southeastern Australia, ranging from Tasmania through central Queensland. Depending on the location, the adults are most common in spring, particularly in April.

== Ecology ==
The larvae feed on silver wattle (Acacia dealbata) and Australian blackwood (Acacia melanoxylon).

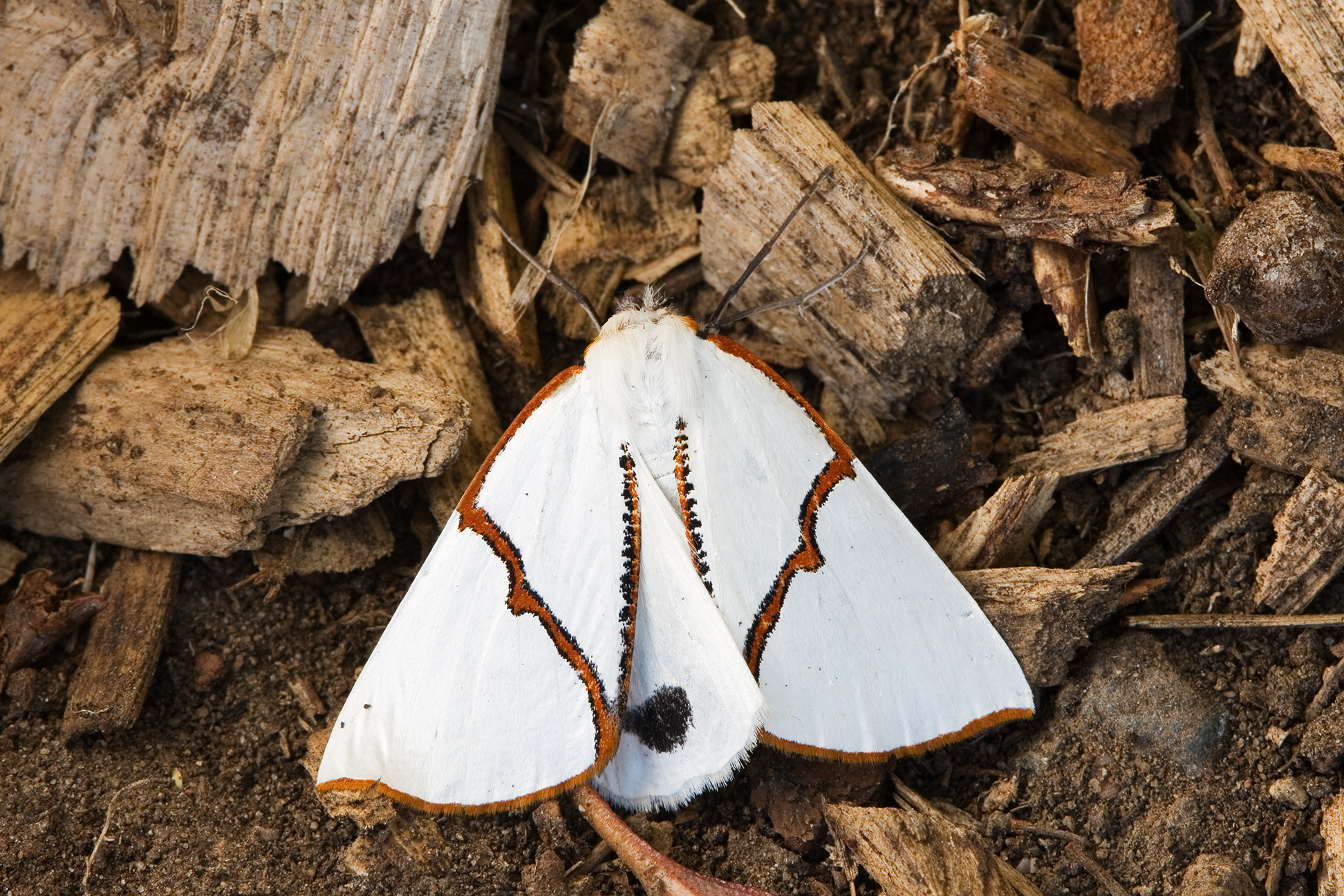
