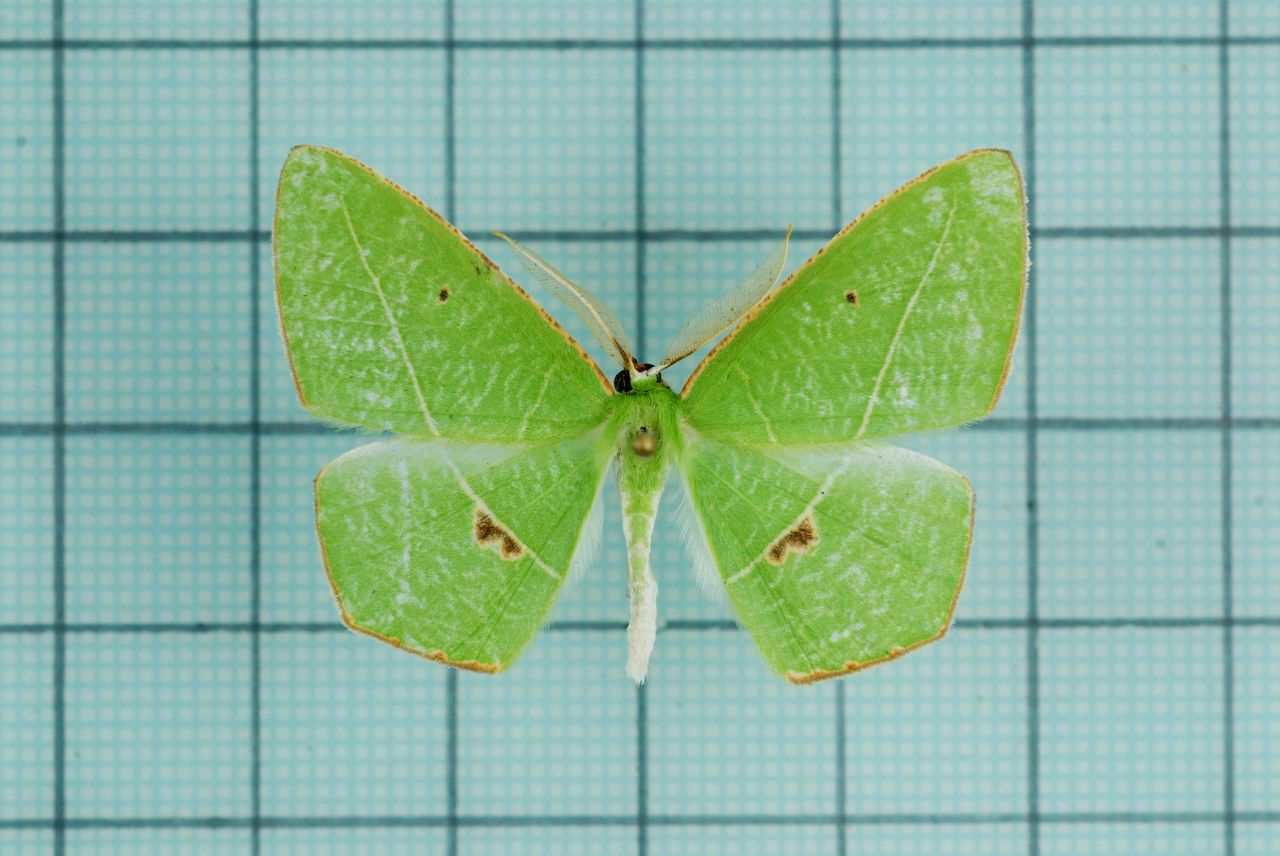
- Male
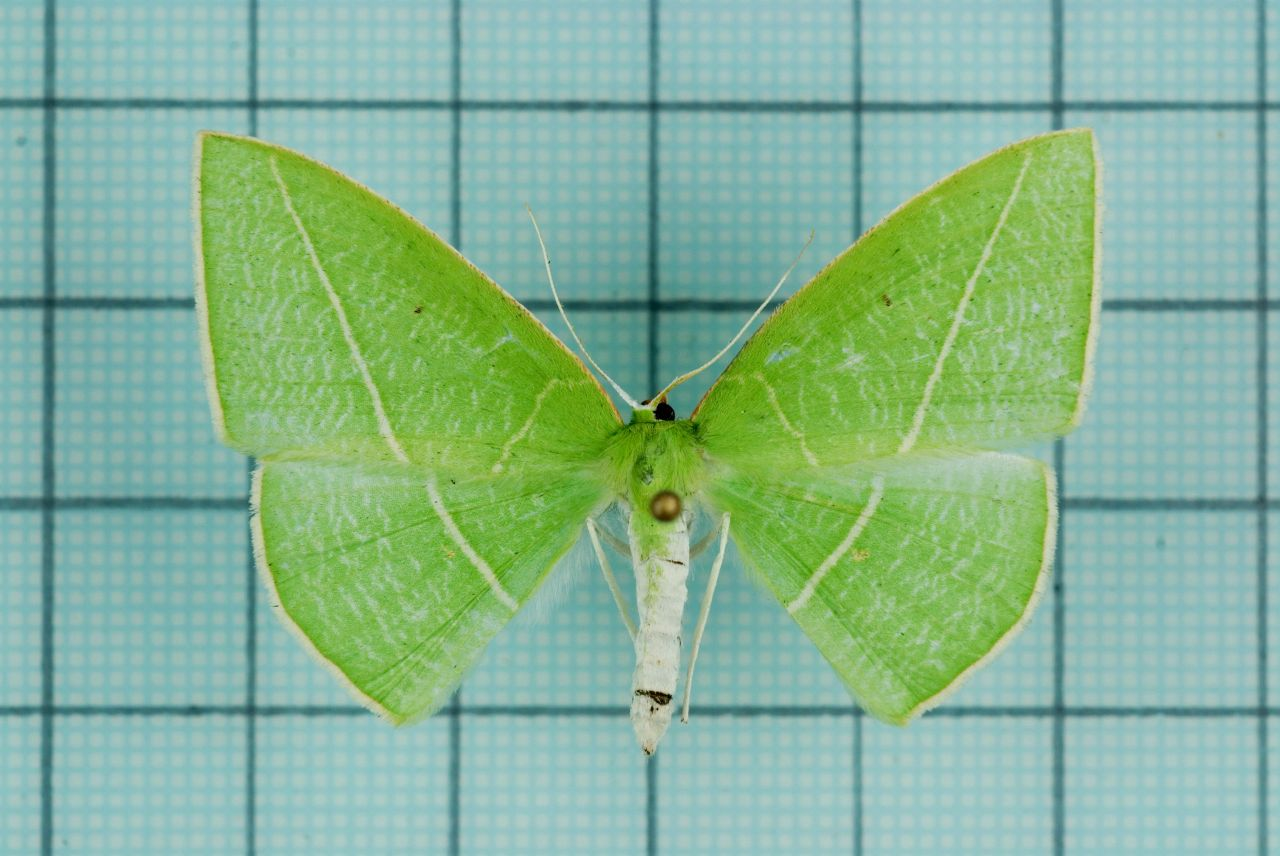
- Female

Scientific classification
- Kingdom: Animalia
- Phylum: Arthropoda
- Class: Insecta
- Order: Lepidoptera
- Family: Geometridae
- Genus: Tanaoctenia
- Species: T. haliaria

Binomial name
- Tanaoctenia haliaria (Walker, 1861)

Synonyms
- Geometra haliaria Walker, 1861; Geometra decoraria Walker, 1866

= Tanaoctenia haliaria =

Species of moth

Tanaoctenia haliaria is a species of moth of the family Geometridae first described by Francis Walker in 1861. It is found in Taiwan, Nepal, China (Xizang), north-eastern India and Myanmar.

The wingspan is 31–45 mm.
