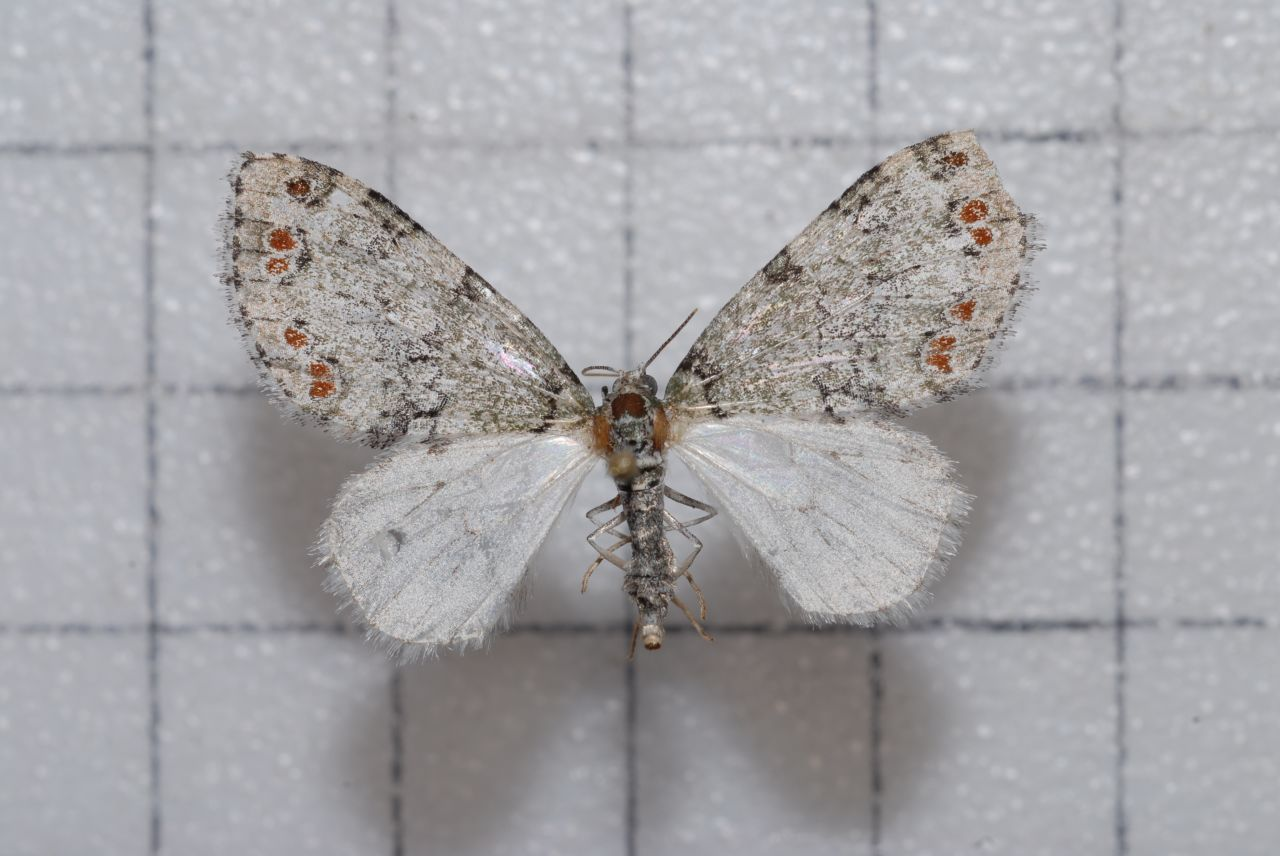

Scientific classification
- Kingdom: Animalia
- Phylum: Arthropoda
- Class: Insecta
- Order: Lepidoptera
- Family: Geometridae
- Genus: Trichopterigia
- Species: T. kishidai

Binomial name
- Trichopterigia kishidai Yazaki, 1987

= Trichopterigia kishidai =

Species of moth

Trichopterigia kishidai is a species of moth of the family Geometridae first described by Yazaki in 1987. It is found in Taiwan.
