= Taeniogramma mendicata =

Scientific classification
- Kingdom: Animalia
- Phylum: Arthropoda
- Clade: Pancrustacea
- Class: Insecta
- Order: Lepidoptera
- Family: Geometridae
- Genus: Taeniogramma
- Species: T. mendicata

Binomial name
- Taeniogramma mendicata (Hulst, 1887)

Synonyms
- Semiothisa mendicata Hulst, 1887

Species of moth

Taeniogramma mendicata is a species of geometrid moth in the family Geometridae. It is found in North America.

The MONA or Hodges number for Taeniogramma mendicata is 6424.
