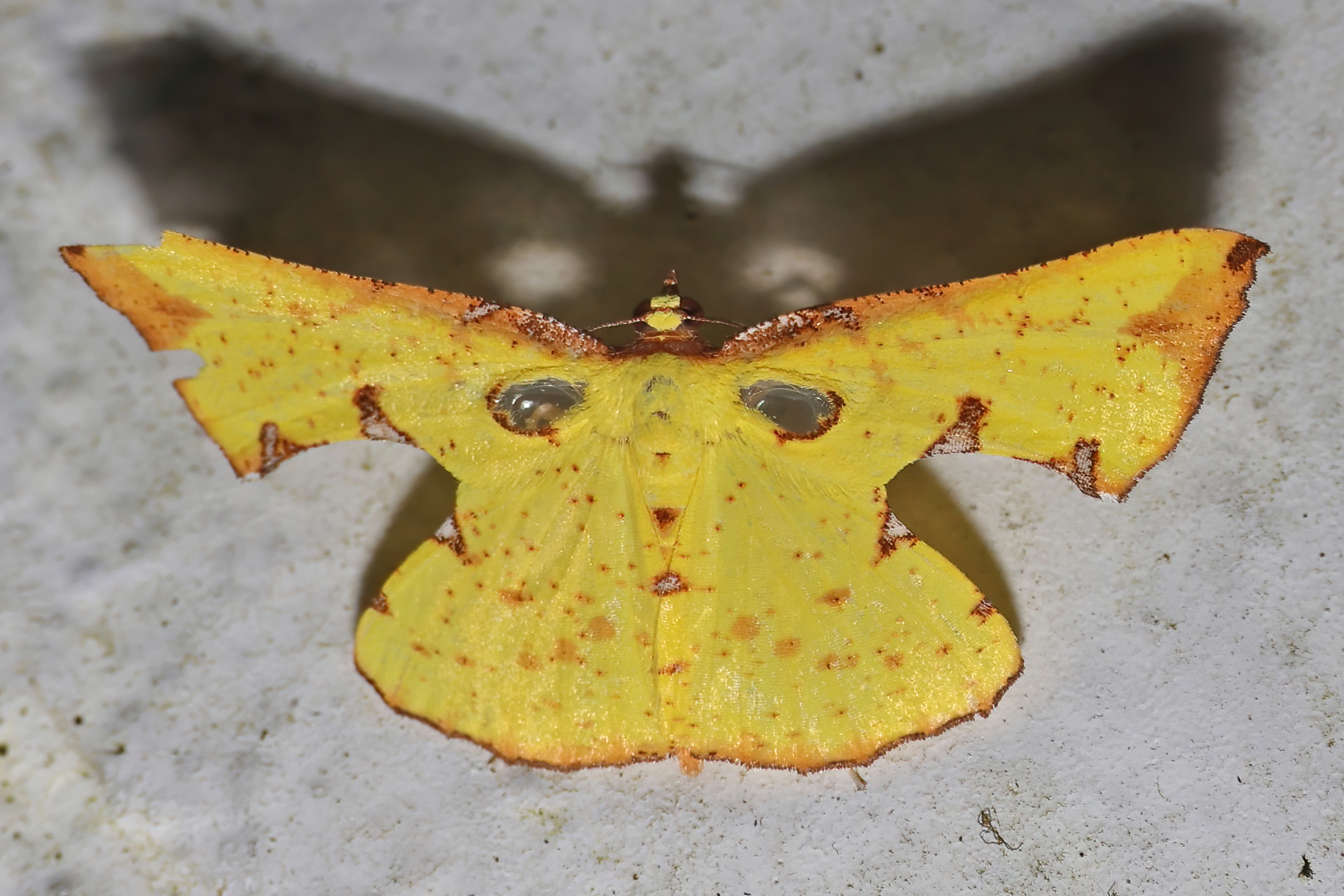
- male, Sri Lanka

Scientific classification
- Kingdom: Animalia
- Phylum: Arthropoda
- Class: Insecta
- Order: Lepidoptera
- Family: Geometridae
- Genus: Corymica
- Species: C. arnearia

Binomial name
- Corymica arnearia Walker, 1860

= Corymica arnearia =

Species of moth

Corymica arnearia is a moth of the family Geometridae first described by Francis Walker in 1860. It is found in Japan, in Taiwan and from the Oriental tropics to Sulawesi and Borneo.

The larvae feed on Cinnamomum camphora. They are bright green with a brown head.
