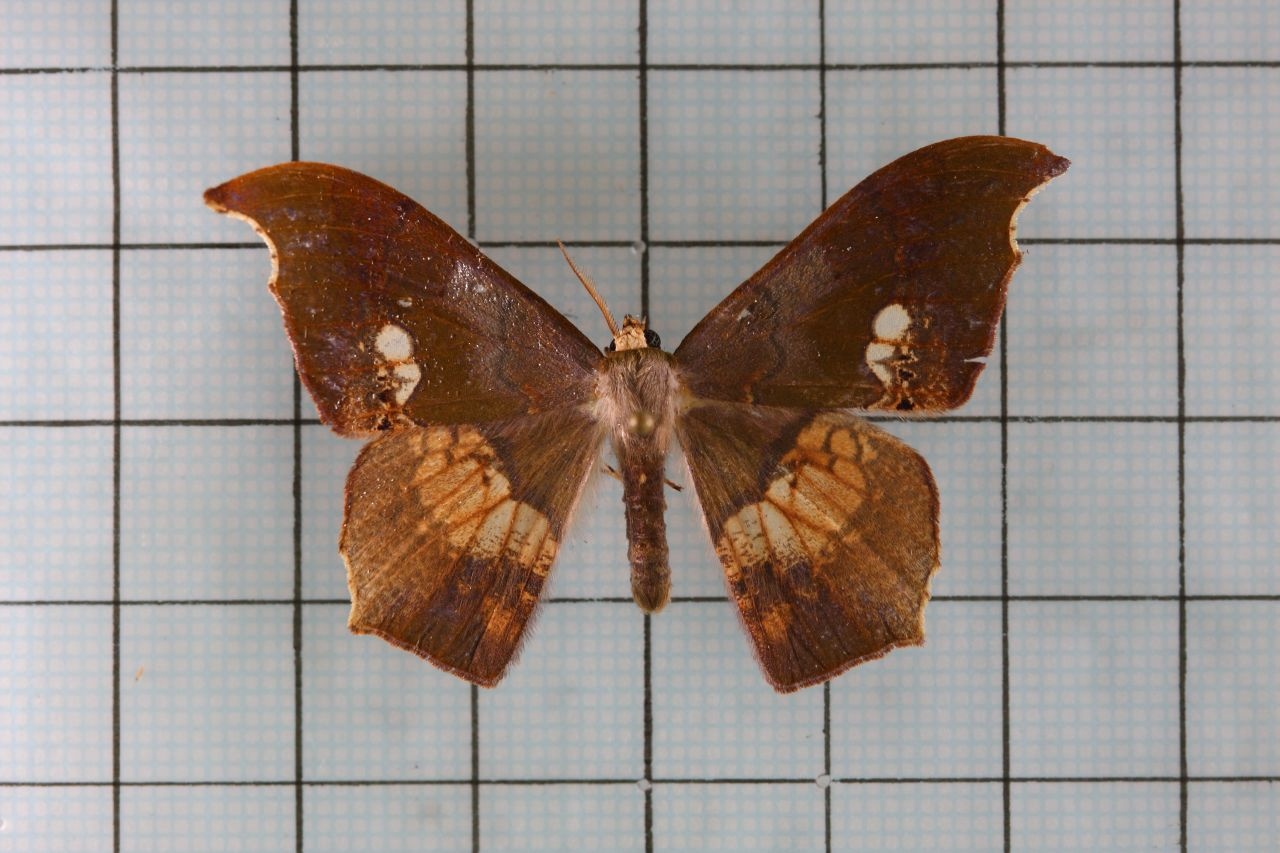

Scientific classification
- Kingdom: Animalia
- Phylum: Arthropoda
- Class: Insecta
- Order: Lepidoptera
- Family: Geometridae
- Genus: Timandromorpha
- Species: T. discolor

Binomial name
- Timandromorpha discolor (Warren, 1896)

Synonyms
- Tanaorhinus discolor Warren, 1896

= Timandromorpha discolor =

Species of moth

Timandromorpha discolor is a species of moth of the family Geometridae first described by William Warren in 1896. It is found in Asia, including India, Thailand and Taiwan.

The wingspan is 46–58 mm.
