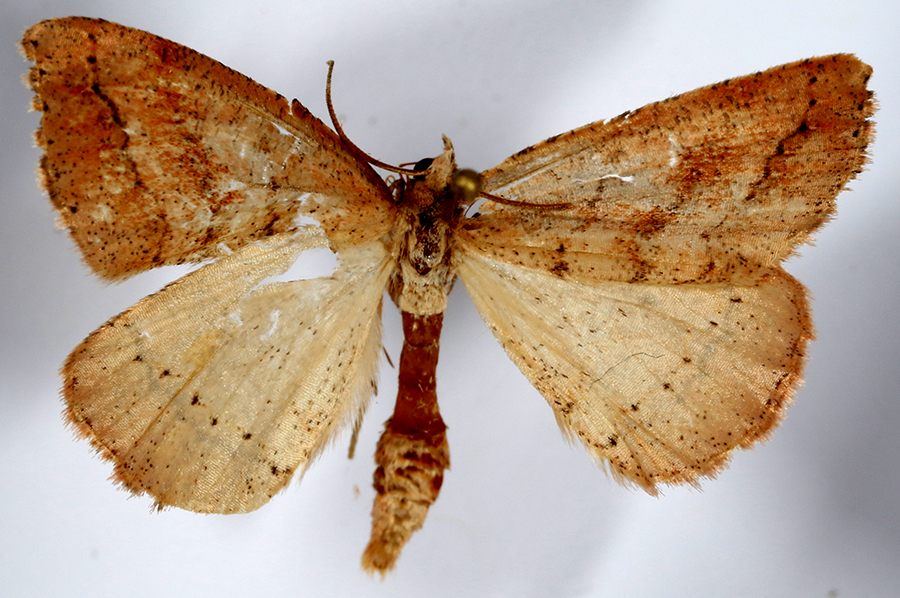

Scientific classification
- Domain: Eukaryota
- Kingdom: Animalia
- Phylum: Arthropoda
- Class: Insecta
- Order: Lepidoptera
- Family: Geometridae
- Genus: Thallophaga
- Species: T. nigroseriata

Binomial name
- Thallophaga nigroseriata (Packard, 1873)

= Thallophaga nigroseriata =

Species of moth

Thallophaga nigroseriata is a species of geometrid moth in the family Geometridae. It is found in Western North America.
