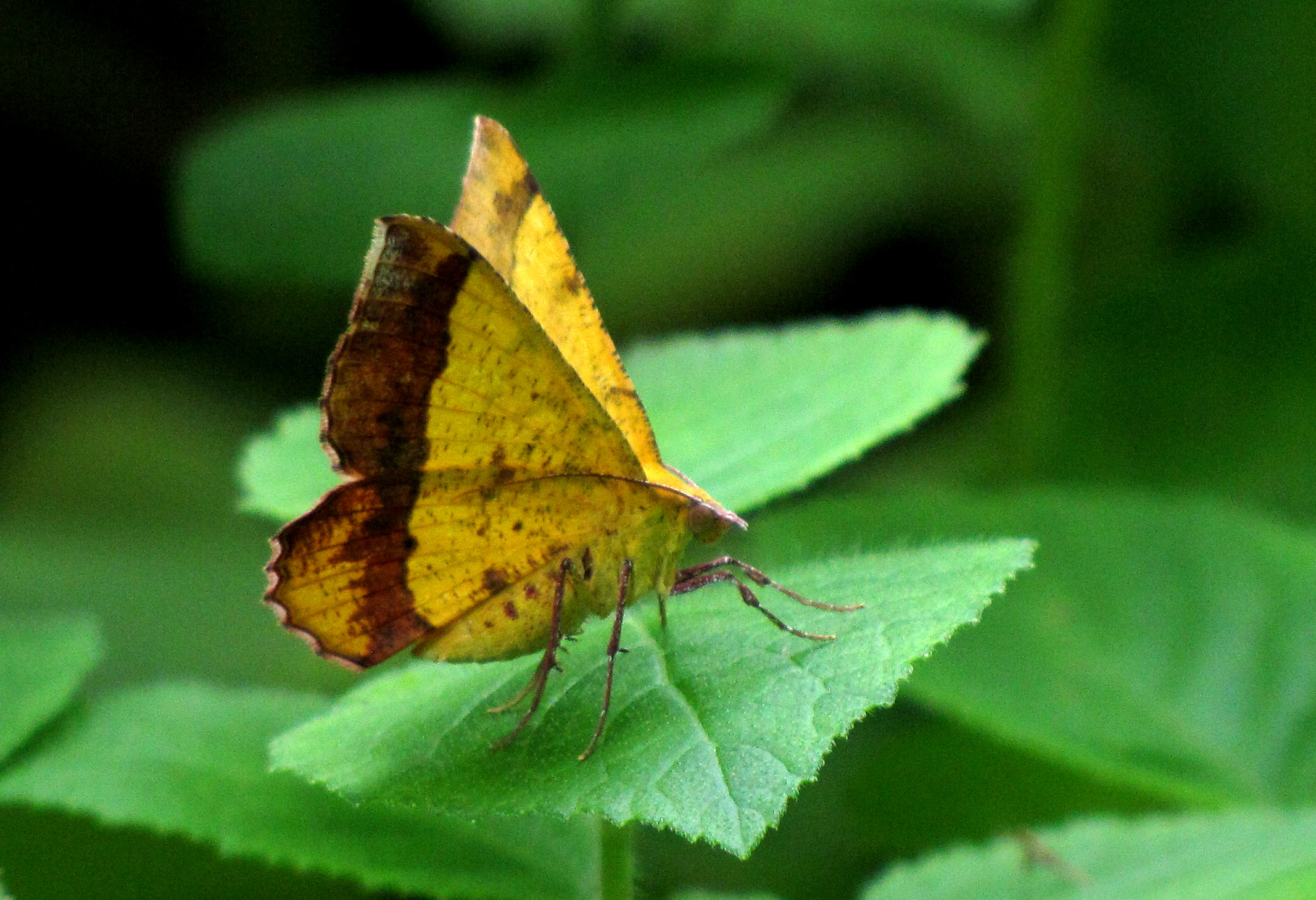

Scientific classification
- Kingdom: Animalia
- Phylum: Arthropoda
- Class: Insecta
- Order: Lepidoptera
- Family: Geometridae
- Genus: Hyperythra
- Species: H. lutea

Binomial name
- Hyperythra lutea Stoll, 1781

Synonyms
- Phalaena lutea Stoll, 1787; Phalaena flavaria Fabricius, 1787; Phalaena flavata Fabricius, 1794; Hyperythra ennomaria Guenée, 1857; Hyperythra limbolaria Guenée, 1857; Hyperythra luteata Guenée, 1857; Hyperythra penicillaria Guenée, 1857; Hyperythra rufifimbria Warren, 1896

= Hyperythra lutea =

Species of moth

Hyperythra lutea is a moth in the family Geometridae. The species was first described by Caspar Stoll in 1781. It is found in Indian subregion, Sri Lanka, South East Asia, Sundaland.

== Description ==
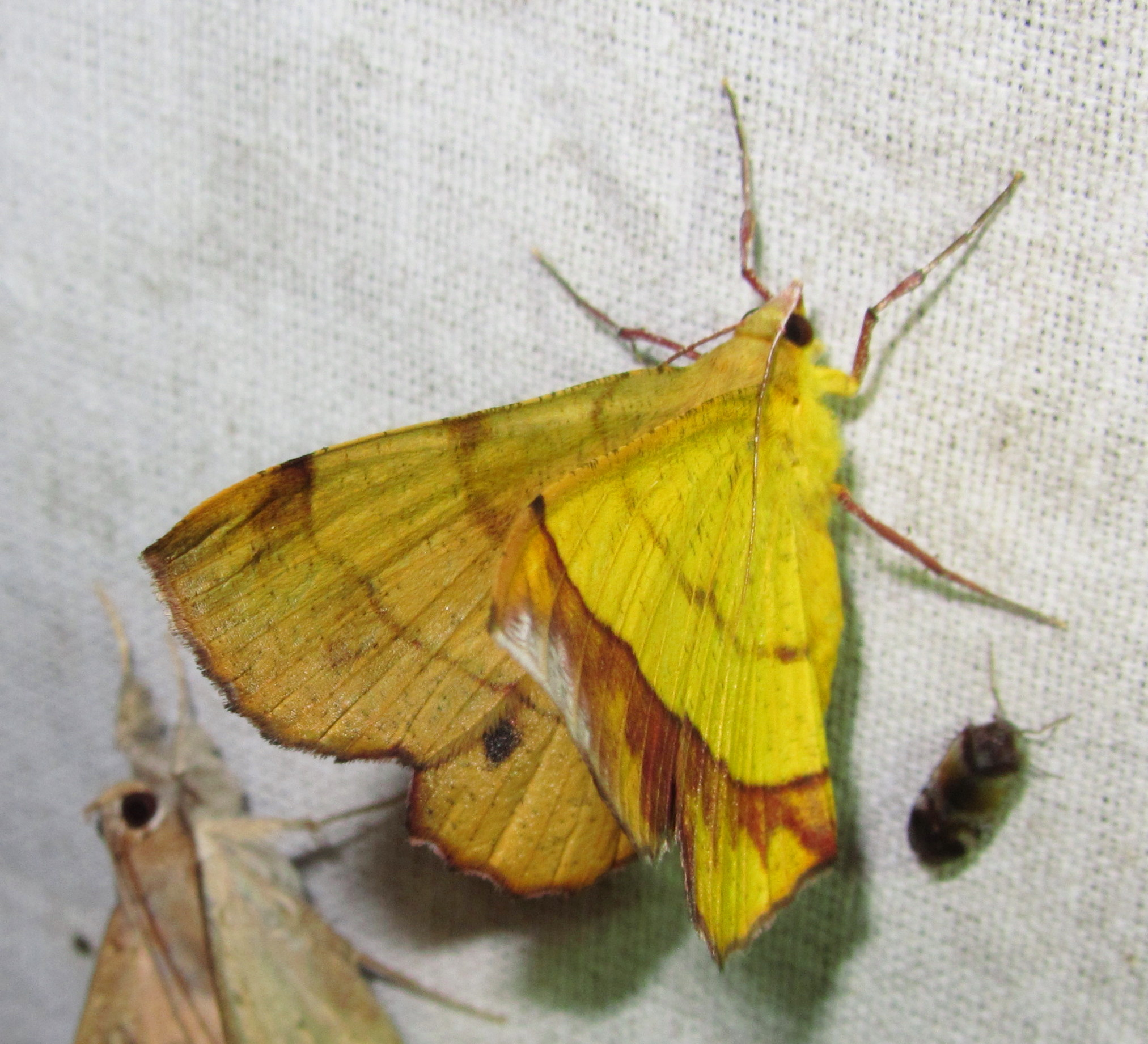

The wingspan of the male is 36 mm. Males with costa of hindwings highly arched. A very long tuft of hair found from base of cell lying in a fold above vein 6. The cell very short and open. Male yellowish, suffused with pink and striated with fuscous. Some white found on palpi and shaft of antennae. Forewings with indistinct antemedial line angled below costa. Medial and postmedial ill-defined, slightly curved pinkish bands. Hindwings with similar narrow antemedial and broad postmedial bands, the latter with one or two black marks on it below costa. Underside bright yellowish, with area beyond the postmedial line more or less completely colored pink. Forewings with a whitish patch below apex. The pink suffusion of upper and underside varies greatly in extent.

The wingspan of the female is 38–46 mm. Female much brighter yellow with three lines to forewing and two to hindwing replacing the bands and usually prominent. Head and body of larvae are finely granulate. Body cylindrical, and pale greyish with black rims. The larvae feed on Gouania species.
