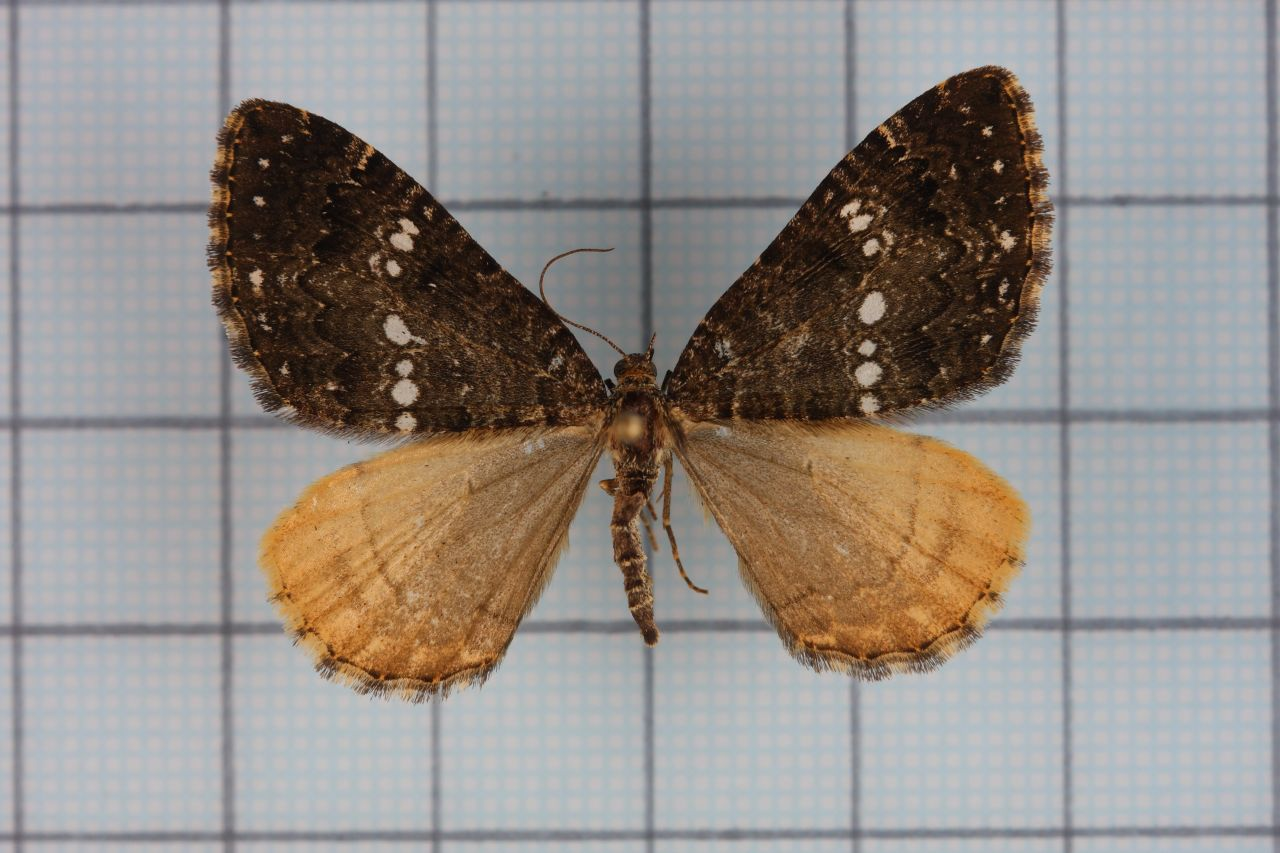

Scientific classification
- Kingdom: Animalia
- Phylum: Arthropoda
- Class: Insecta
- Order: Lepidoptera
- Family: Geometridae
- Genus: Trichoplites
- Species: T. albimaculosa

Binomial name
- Trichoplites albimaculosa Inoue, 1978

= Trichoplites albimaculosa =

Species of moth

Trichoplites albimaculosa is a species of moth of the family Geometridae first described by Hiroshi Inoue in 1978. It is found in Taiwan.
