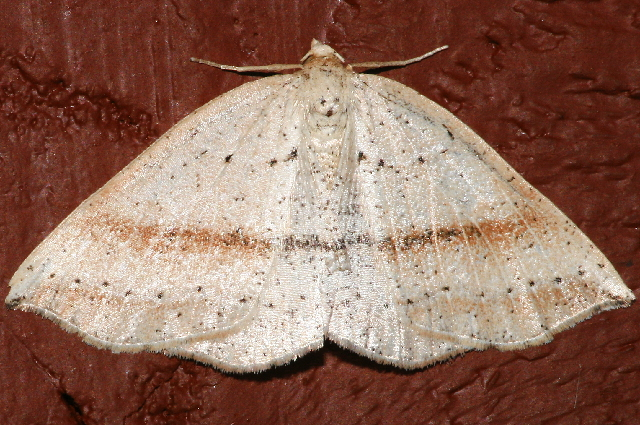

Scientific classification
- Domain: Eukaryota
- Kingdom: Animalia
- Phylum: Arthropoda
- Class: Insecta
- Order: Lepidoptera
- Family: Geometridae
- Tribe: Lithinini
- Genus: Thallophaga
- Species: T. taylorata

Binomial name
- Thallophaga taylorata (Hulst, 1896)

= Thallophaga taylorata =

Species of moth

Thallophaga taylorata is a species of geometrid moth in the family Geometridae. It is found in Western North America.
