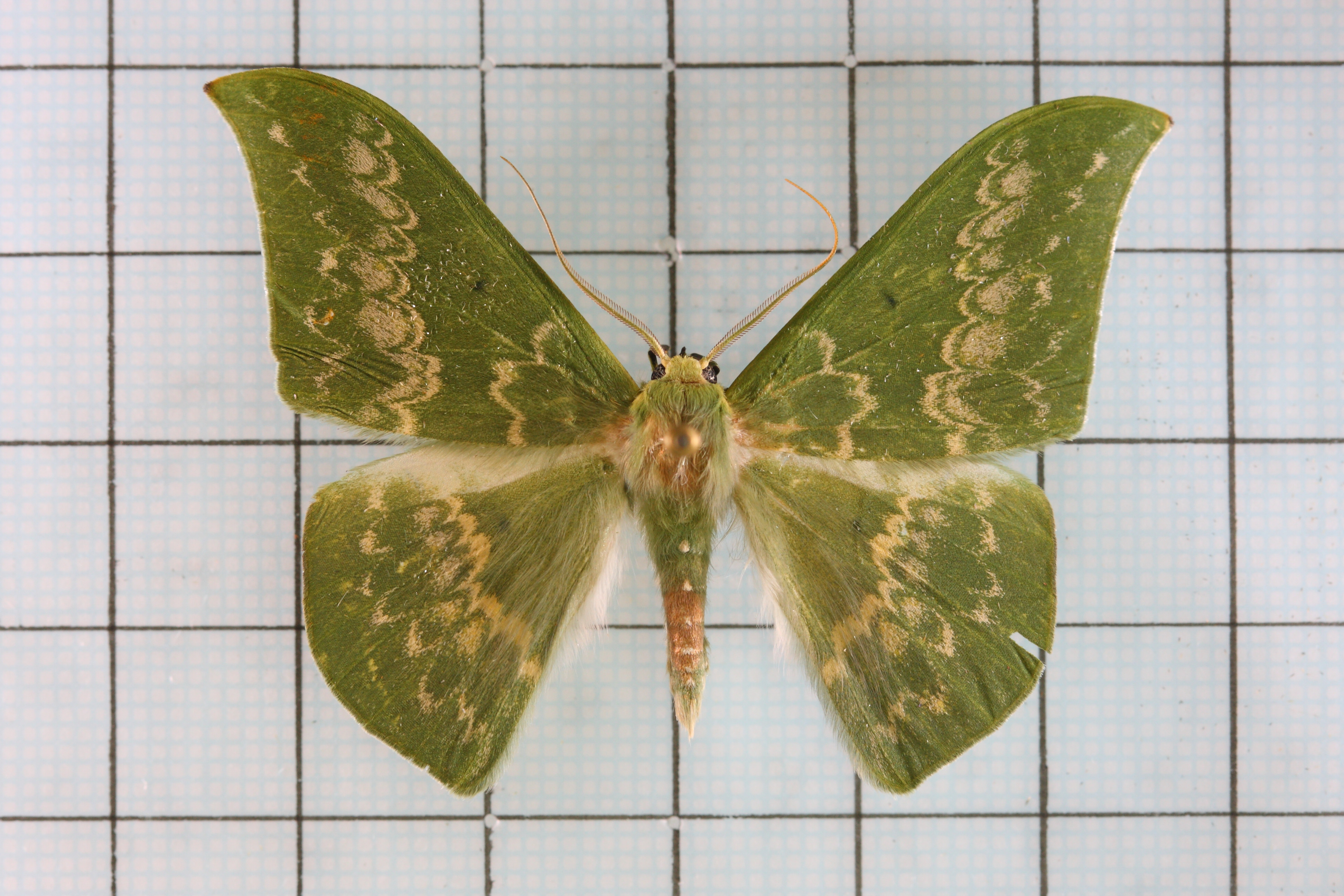

Scientific classification
- Domain: Eukaryota
- Kingdom: Animalia
- Phylum: Arthropoda
- Class: Insecta
- Order: Lepidoptera
- Family: Geometridae
- Genus: Tanaorhinus
- Species: T. kina

Binomial name
- Tanaorhinus kina C. Swinhoe, 1893

= Tanaorhinus kina =

Species of moth

Tanaorhinus kina is a species of moth of the family Geometridae first described by Charles Swinhoe in 1893. It is found in Asia, including India, Bhutan and Taiwan.

The wingspan is 47–60 mm.

== Subspecies ==
- Tanaorhinus kina kina (India)
- Tanaorhinus kina embrithes Prout, 1934 (Sikkim)
- Tanaorhinus kina flavinfra Inoue, 1978 (Taiwan)
