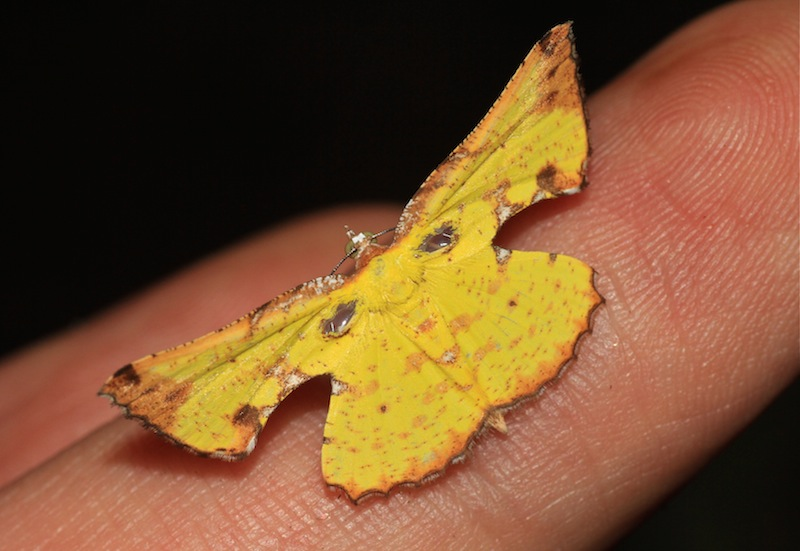

Scientific classification
- Domain: Eukaryota
- Kingdom: Animalia
- Phylum: Arthropoda
- Class: Insecta
- Order: Lepidoptera
- Family: Geometridae
- Genus: Corymica
- Species: C. pryeri

Binomial name
- Corymica pryeri (Butler, 1878)

Synonyms
- Thiopsyche pryeri Butler, 1878; Corymica vitrigera Butler, 1889; Corymica oblongimacula Warren, 1896; Corymica prattorum Prout, 1929

= Corymica pryeri =

Species of moth

Corymica pryeri is a species of moth of the family Geometridae first described by Arthur Gardiner Butler in 1878. It is found in Japan, Taiwan, the north-eastern Himalayas, Sumatra, Borneo, New Guinea and possibly Queensland, Australia.

The wingspan is 25–30 mm.

The larvae feed on Lindera, Neolitsea, Machilus, Meratia and Persea species.
