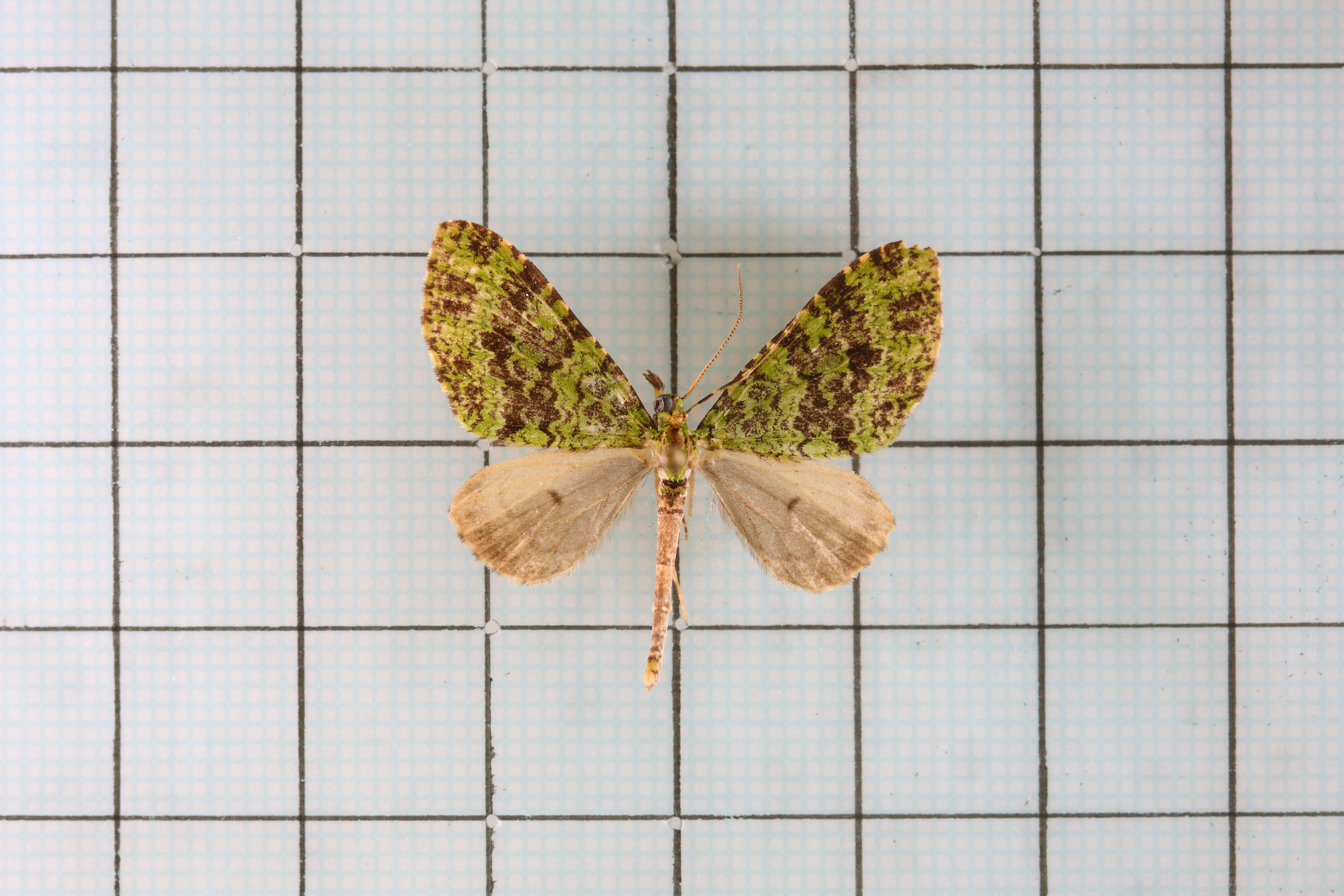

Scientific classification
- Domain: Eukaryota
- Kingdom: Animalia
- Phylum: Arthropoda
- Class: Insecta
- Order: Lepidoptera
- Family: Geometridae
- Genus: Tristeirometa
- Species: T. decussata

Binomial name
- Tristeirometa decussata (Moore, 1868)

Synonyms
- Sauris decussata Moore, 1868; Phthonoloba moltrechti Prout, 1958

= Tristeirometa decussata =

Species of moth

Tristeirometa decussata is a moth of the family Geometridae first described by Frederic Moore in 1868. It is found in north-eastern India and Taiwan.

The larvae feed on the leaves of Rosa, Citrus and Malus species.

== Subspecies ==
- Tristeirometa decussata decussata (India)
- Tristeirometa decussata moltrechti (Prout, 1958) (Taiwan)
