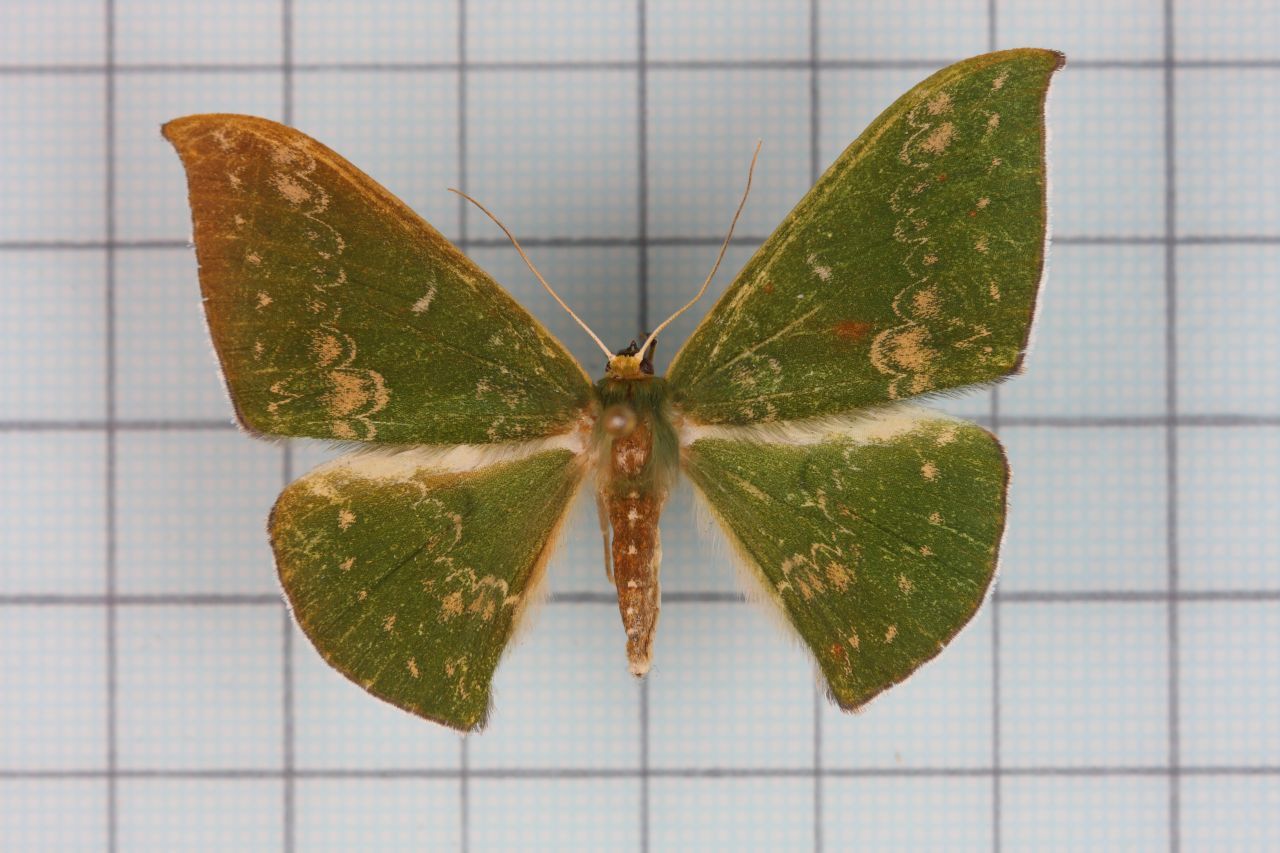

Scientific classification
- Kingdom: Animalia
- Phylum: Arthropoda
- Class: Insecta
- Order: Lepidoptera
- Family: Geometridae
- Genus: Tanaorhinus
- Species: T. formosanus

Binomial name
- Tanaorhinus formosanus Okano, 1959

Synonyms
- Tanaorhinus formosana

= Tanaorhinus formosanus =

Species of moth

Tanaorhinus formosanus is a species of moth of the family Geometridae first described by Okano in 1959. It is found in Taiwan.
