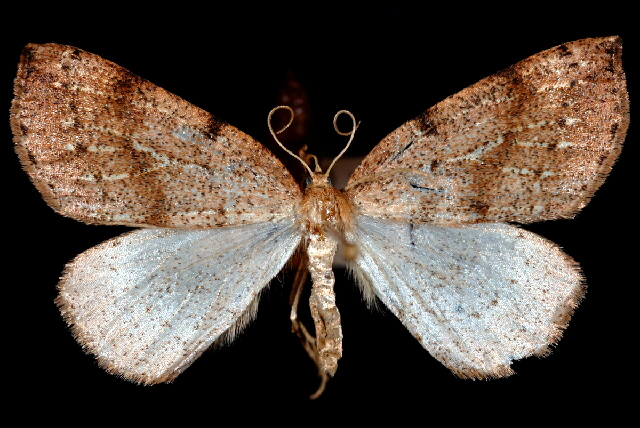

Scientific classification
- Kingdom: Animalia
- Phylum: Arthropoda
- Clade: Pancrustacea
- Class: Insecta
- Order: Lepidoptera
- Family: Geometridae
- Genus: Thallophaga
- Species: T. hyperborea

Binomial name
- Thallophaga hyperborea (Hulst, 1900)

Synonyms
- Tetracis hyperborea Hulst, 1900

= Thallophaga hyperborea =

Species of moth

Thallophaga hyperborea, the northern thallophaga, is a moth of the family Geometridae. The species was described by George Duryea Hulst in 1900. It occurs in Western North America, from California, USA, to British Columbia, Canada, and the Alaskan Panhandle.

The wingspan is 30–37 mm (1.2–1.5 in). Adults emerge from April to May. The larvae feed on western hemlock, Douglas fir, red cedar, and other fir species. The moth has also been recorded on willow and alder, as well as other conifers.
