= Taeniogramma octolineata =

Scientific classification
- Domain: Eukaryota
- Kingdom: Animalia
- Phylum: Arthropoda
- Class: Insecta
- Order: Lepidoptera
- Family: Geometridae
- Genus: Taeniogramma
- Species: T. octolineata

Binomial name
- Taeniogramma octolineata (Hulst, 1887)

Synonyms
- Semiothisa octolineata Hulst, 1887

Species of moth

Taeniogramma octolineata is a species of geometrid moth in the family Geometridae. It is found in North America.

The MONA or Hodges number for Taeniogramma octolineata is 6423.
