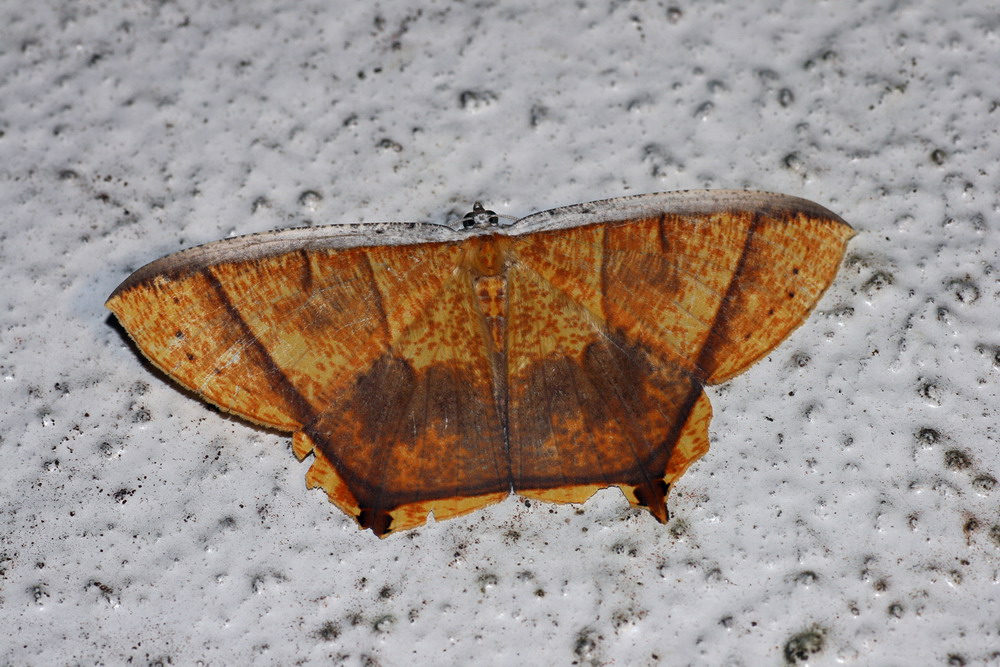

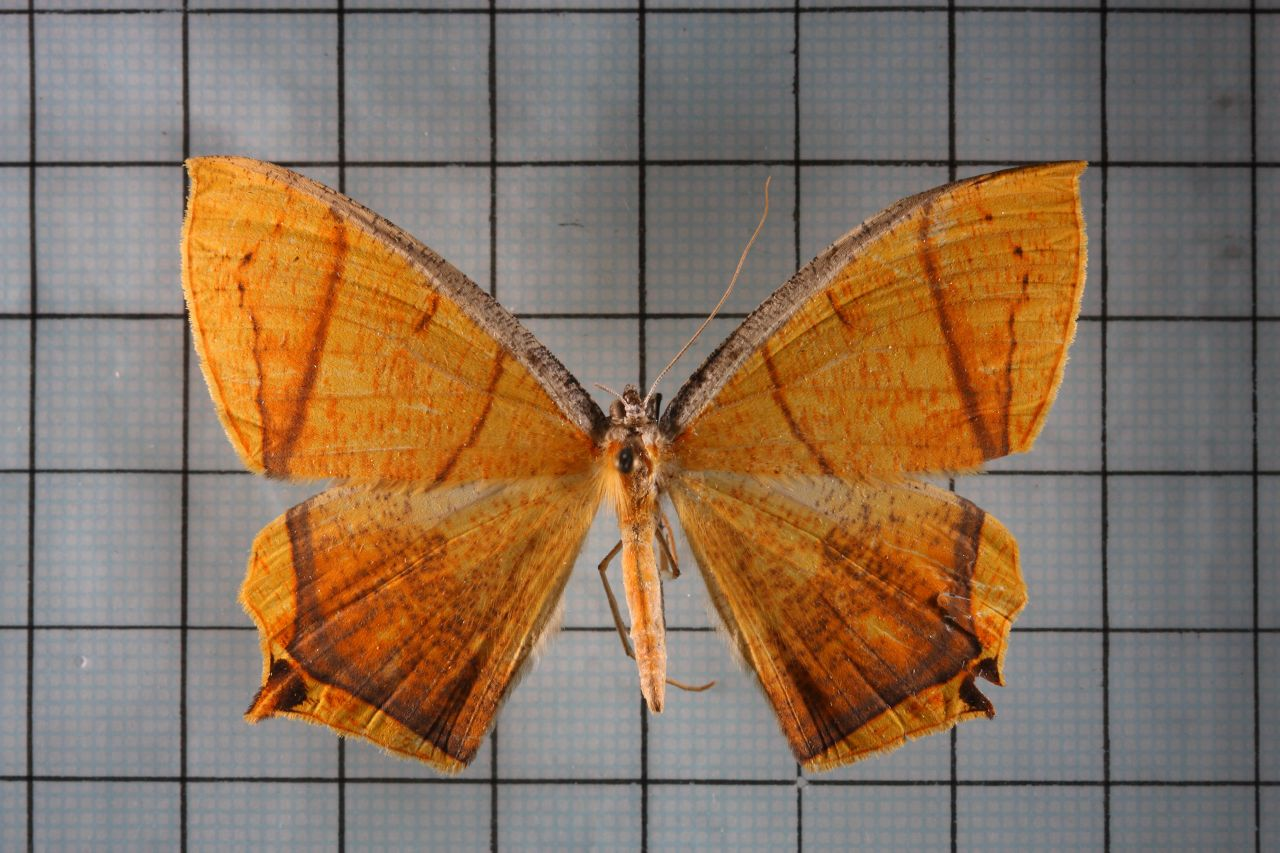

Scientific classification
- Domain: Eukaryota
- Kingdom: Animalia
- Phylum: Arthropoda
- Class: Insecta
- Order: Lepidoptera
- Family: Geometridae
- Genus: Thinopteryx
- Species: T. crocoptera

Binomial name
- Thinopteryx crocoptera Kollar, 1844

= Thinopteryx crocoptera =

Species of moth

Thinopteryx crocoptera is a moth of the family Geometridae first described by Vincenz Kollar in 1844. It is found in eastern Asia, including Japan, Thailand, Myanmar and Malaysia.

== Description ==
The wingspan is 51–64 mm. Body orange yellow. Head and collar white, irrorated (sprinkled) with fuscous. Wings with numerous orange strigae more or less combined into patches. Forewings with white costa, irrorated with fuscous. Antemedial and postmedial oblique fuscous line present, sometimes slightly curved. There is a fuscous line found on the discocellulars. A submarginal more or less lunulate line present, often reduced to a series of specks towards costa. Hindwings with a fuscous line on discocellulars. A double submarginal line angled at base of tail. A fuscous patch can be seen on tail.

== Subspecies ==
- Thinopteryx crocoptera crocoptera
- Thinopteryx crocoptera striolata (Japan)
- Thinopteryx crocoptera assamensis Swinhoe, 1916 (Thailand, Taiwan)
- Thinopteryx crocoptera erythrosticta
