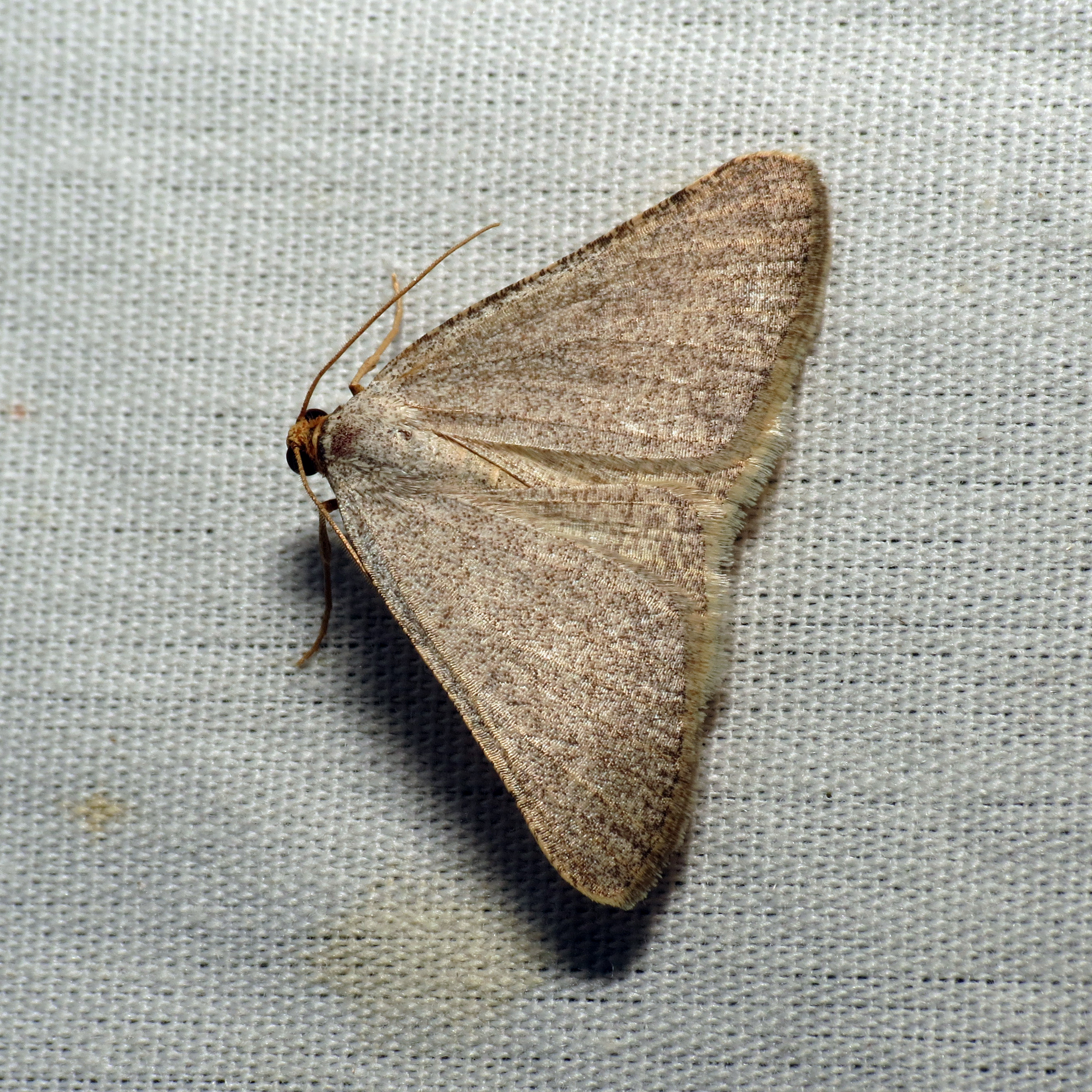

Scientific classification
- Domain: Eukaryota
- Kingdom: Animalia
- Phylum: Arthropoda
- Class: Insecta
- Order: Lepidoptera
- Family: Geometridae
- Genus: Taeniogramma
- Species: T. tenebrosata

Binomial name
- Taeniogramma tenebrosata (Hulst, 1887)

Synonyms
- Semiothisa tenebrosata Hulst, 1887

= Taeniogramma tenebrosata =

Species of moth

Taeniogramma tenebrosata is a species of geometrid moth in the family Geometridae. It is found in Central America and North America.

The MONA or Hodges number for Taeniogramma tenebrosata is 6425.
