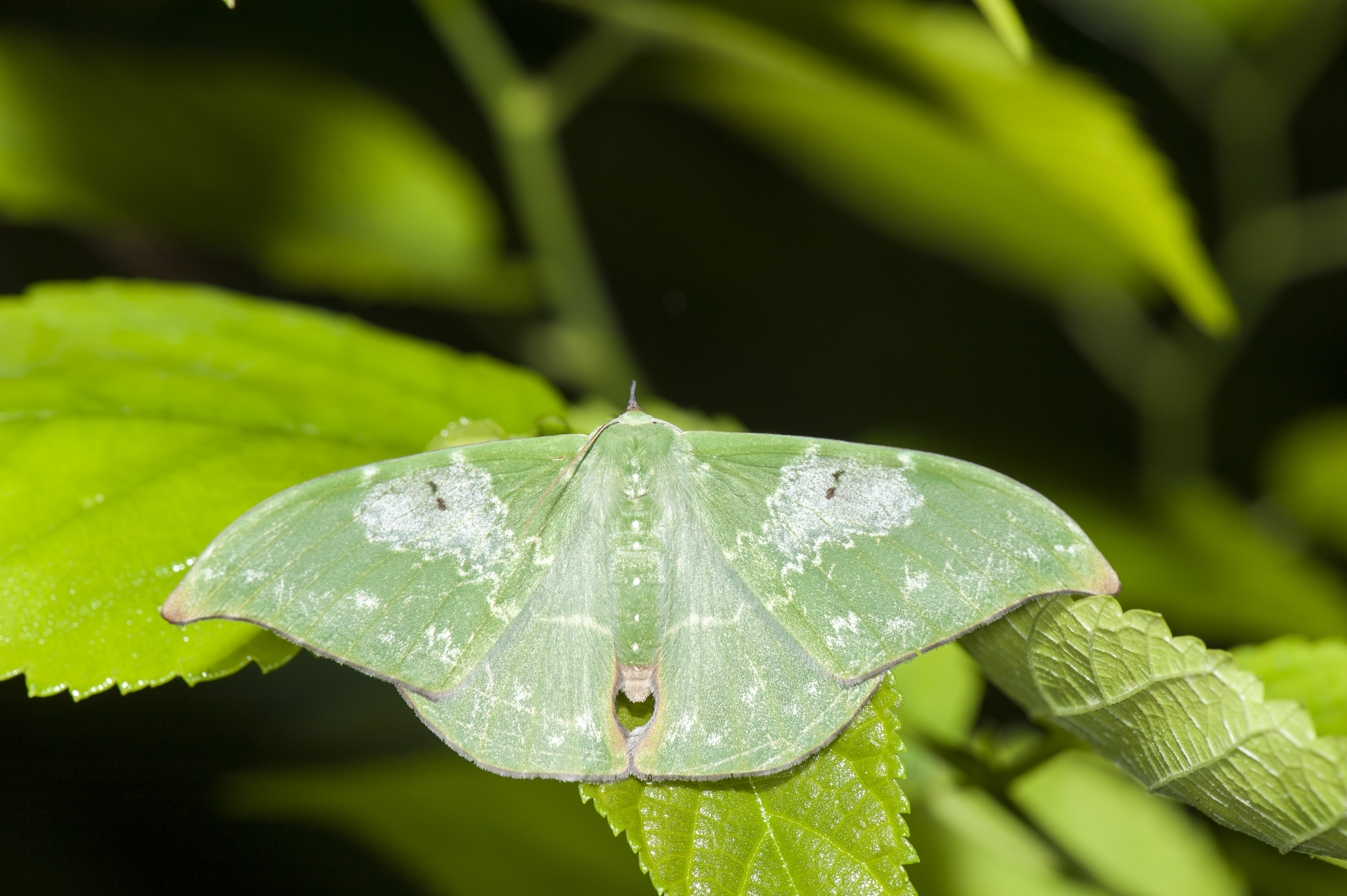

Scientific classification
- Kingdom: Animalia
- Phylum: Arthropoda
- Class: Insecta
- Order: Lepidoptera
- Family: Geometridae
- Genus: Tanaorhinus
- Species: T. viridiluteata

Binomial name
- Tanaorhinus viridiluteata (Walker, 1861)

Synonyms
- Geometra viridiluteata Walker, 1861; Tanaorhinus viridiluteata (Walker, 1861) [or variant Tanaorhinus viridiluteatus)

= Tanaorhinus viridiluteata =

Species of moth

Tanaorhinus viridiluteata is a species of moth of the family Geometridae first described by Francis Walker in 1861. The wingspan is 48–70 mm.

== Range ==
The species is found widely across Southeastern Asia, including Taiwan and India.
