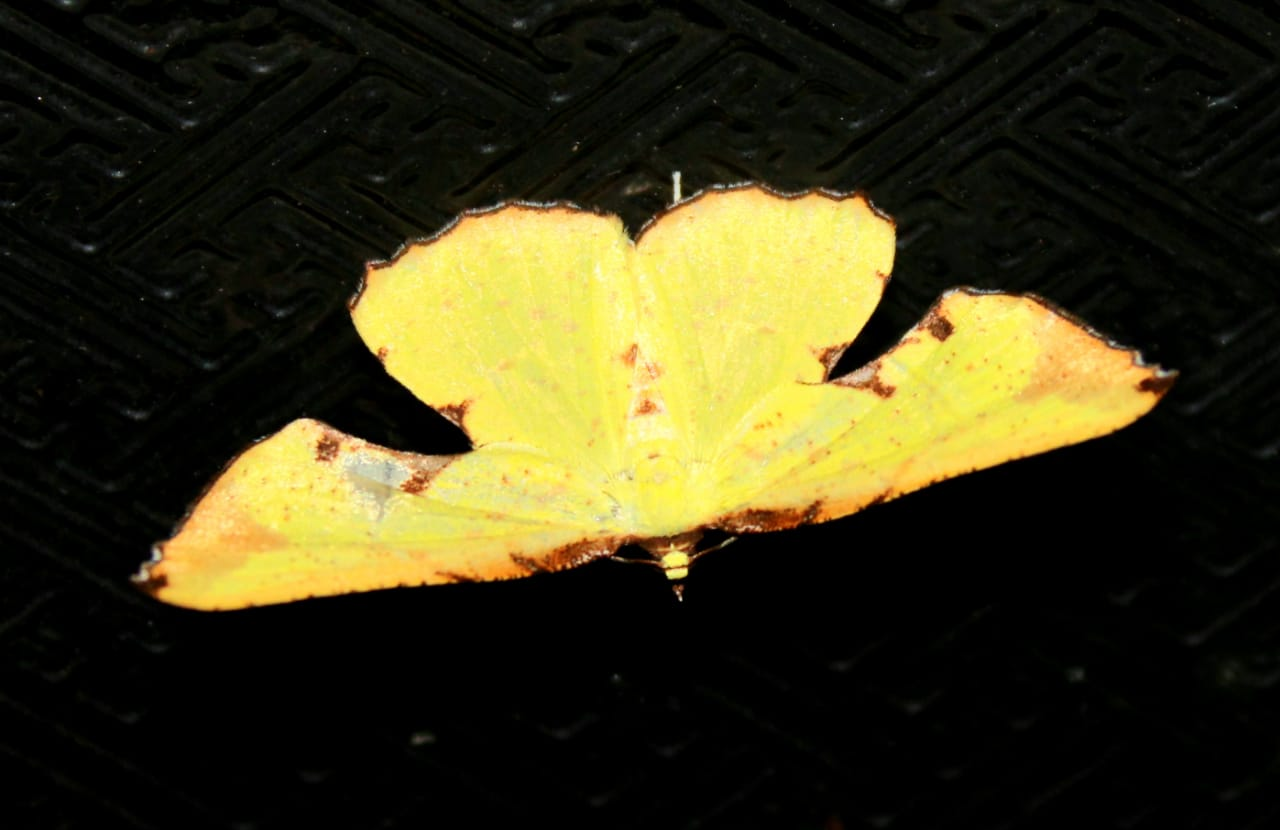

Scientific classification
- Domain: Eukaryota
- Kingdom: Animalia
- Phylum: Arthropoda
- Class: Insecta
- Order: Lepidoptera
- Family: Geometridae
- Genus: Corymica
- Species: C. specularia

Binomial name
- Corymica specularia Moore, [1867]

Synonyms
- Caprilia specularia Moore, [1868]

= Corymica specularia =

Species of moth

Corymica specularia is a moth of the family Geometridae first described by Frederic Moore in 1867. It is found in Sri Lanka, India and Taiwan.

It is generally a yellow moth with brownish tips of the forewings. Two subspecies are recognized:

- Corymica specularia crocina Wehrli, 1939
- Corymica specularia nea Wehrli, 1939
