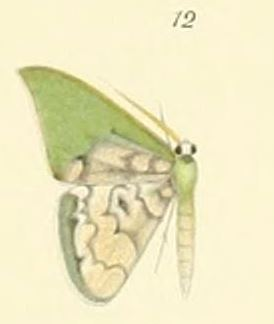

Scientific classification
- Kingdom: Animalia
- Phylum: Arthropoda
- Clade: Pancrustacea
- Class: Insecta
- Order: Lepidoptera
- Family: Geometridae
- Subfamily: Geometrinae
- Genus: Tachychlora; L. B. Prout, 1912

= Tachychlora =

Genus of moths

Tachychlora is a genus of moths in the family Geometridae. The genus was erected by Louis Beethoven Prout in 1912.

== Species ==
Some species of this genus are:

- Tachychlora amilletes Prout, 1932
- Tachychlora baeogonia Prout, 1932
- Tachychlora clita Prout, 1932
- Tachychlora explicata Prout, 1932
- Tachychlora flavicoma (Warren, 1906)
- Tachychlora flavidisca (Warren, 1904)
- Tachychlora flora E. D. Jones, 1921
- Tachychlora insignis
- Tachychlora intrapunctata Prout, 1932
- Tachychlora lepidaria (Möschler, 1882)
- Tachychlora phaeozona Prout, 1932
- Tachychlora prasia Prout, 1916
- Tachychlora pretiosa
- Tachychlora silena Schaus, 1901
- Tachychlora subscripta (Warren, 1897)
- Tachychlora uricha (Kaye, 1901)
