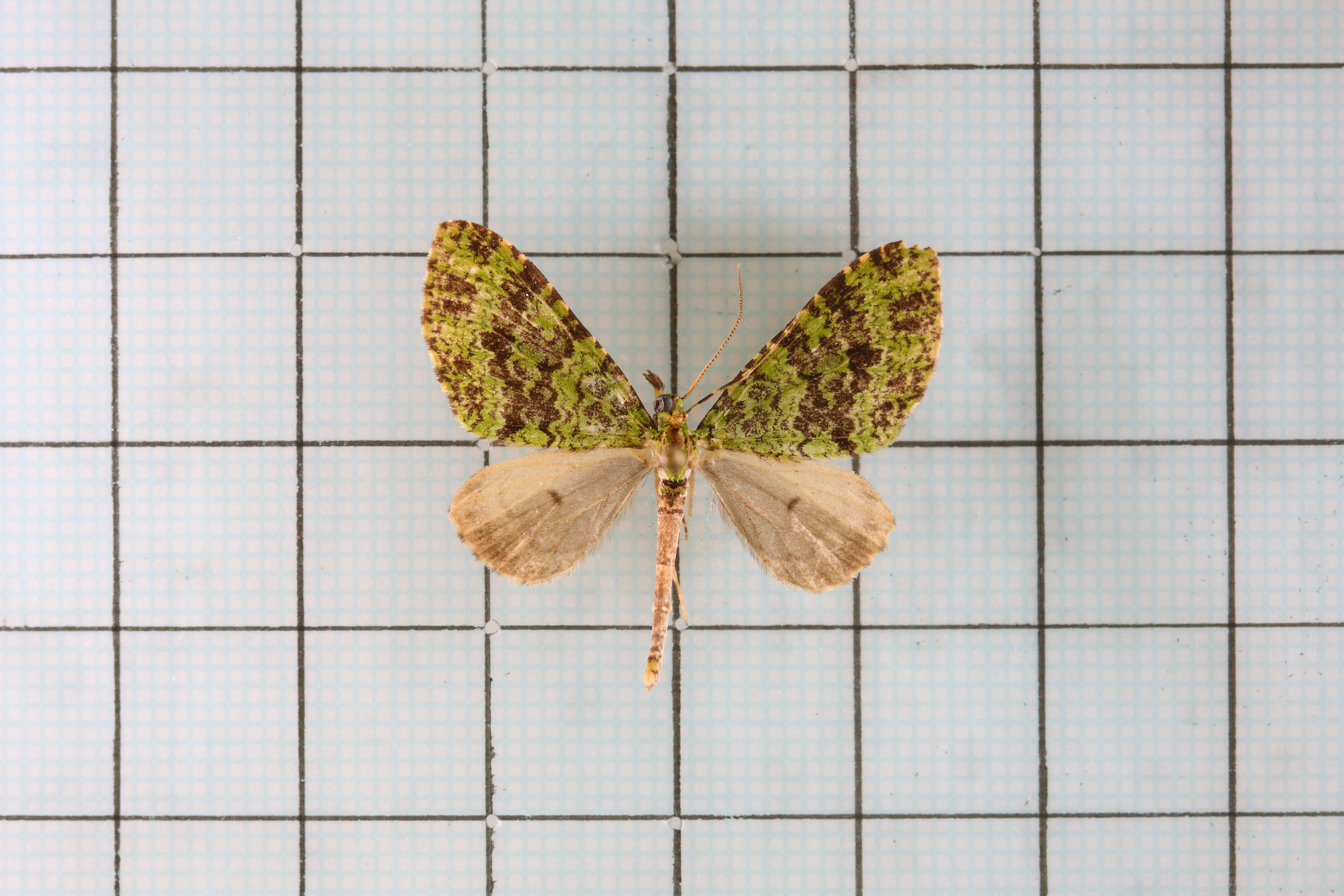

Scientific classification
- Kingdom: Animalia
- Phylum: Arthropoda
- Clade: Pancrustacea
- Class: Insecta
- Order: Lepidoptera
- Family: Geometridae
- Tribe: Trichopterygini
- Genus: Tristeirometa; Holloway, 1997

= Tristeirometa =

Genus of moths

Tristeirometa is a genus of moths in the family Geometridae.

== Species ==
- Tristeirometa auxostira (Prout, 1925)
- Tristeirometa bathylima (Prout, 1932)
- Tristeirometa benguetana (Schultze, 1910)
- Tristeirometa bostryx (Prout, 1932)
- Tristeirometa curvistriga (Warren, 1894)
- Tristeirometa decussata (Moore, 1868)
- Tristeirometa mesogrammata (Walker, 1863)
