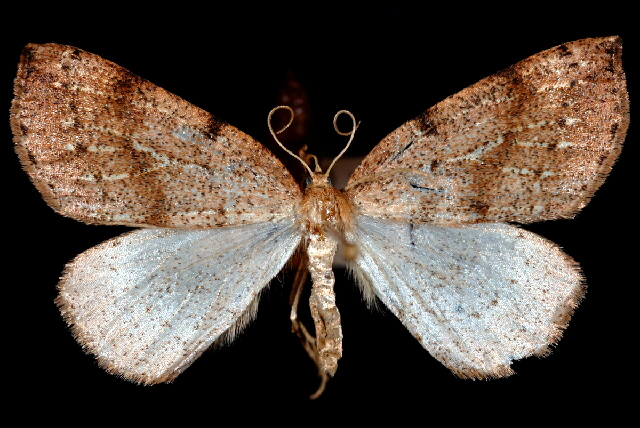
- Thallophaga hyperborea

Scientific classification
- Kingdom: Animalia
- Phylum: Arthropoda
- Class: Insecta
- Order: Lepidoptera
- Family: Geometridae
- Tribe: Lithinini
- Genus: Thallophaga; Hulst, 1896

= Thallophaga =

Genus of moths

Thallophaga is a genus of moths in the family Geometridae described by George Duryea Hulst in 1896.

== Species ==
There are three recognized species:

- Thallophaga taylorata (Hulst, 1896)
- Thallophaga hyperborea (Hulst, 1900)
- Thallophaga nigroseriata (Packard, 1874)
