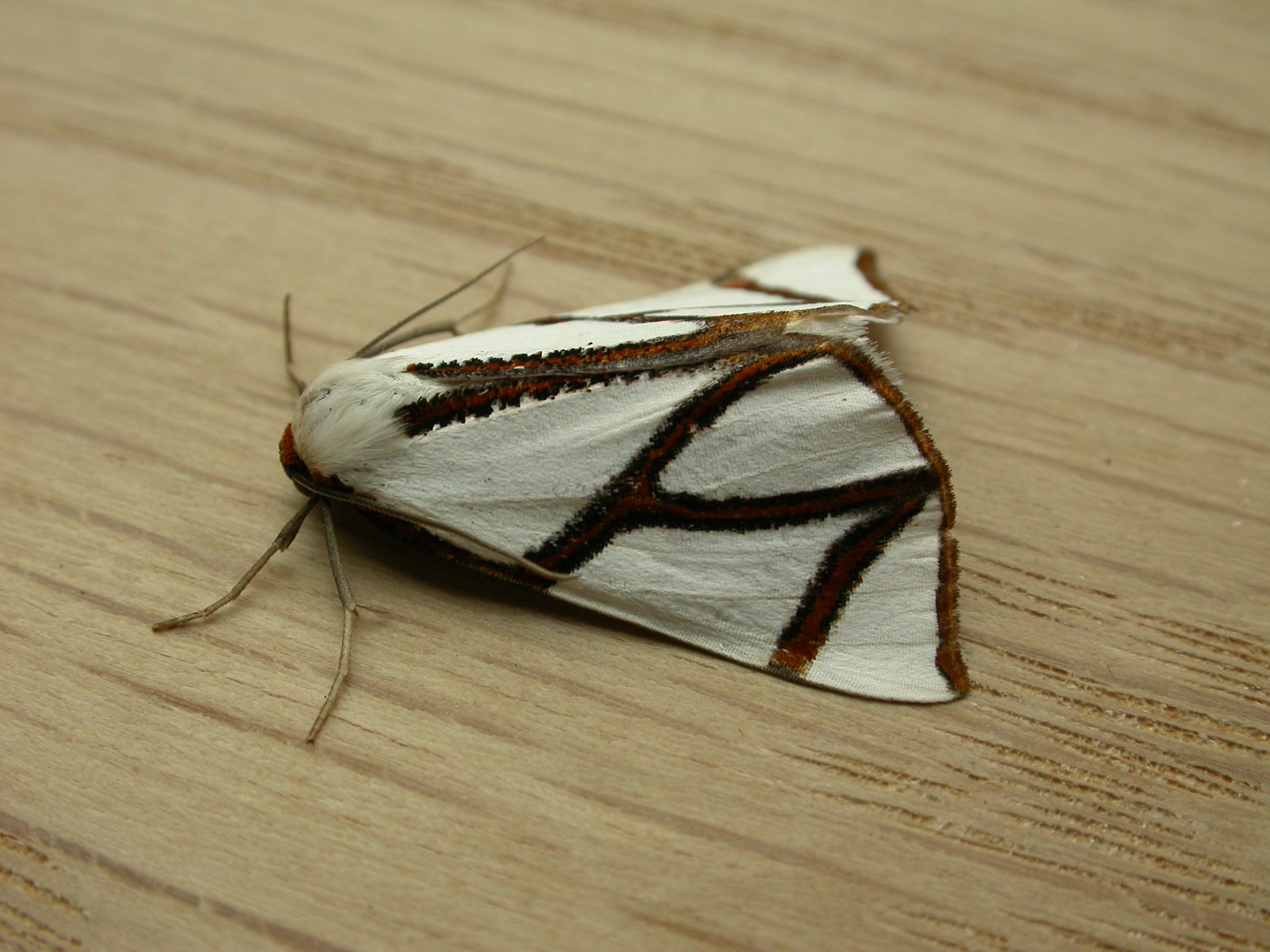

Scientific classification
- Kingdom: Animalia
- Phylum: Arthropoda
- Class: Insecta
- Order: Lepidoptera
- Family: Geometridae
- Genus: Thalaina
- Species: T. clara

Binomial name
- Thalaina clara Walker, 1855

= Thalaina clara =

Species of moth

Thalaina clara, or Clara's satin moth, is a moth of the family Geometridae. The species was first described by Francis Walker in 1855. It is endemic to south-eastern Australia.

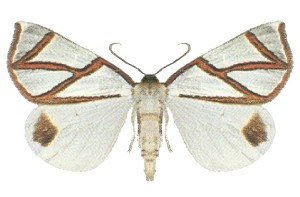
Mounted

The wingspan is about 50 mm.

The larvae feed on Acacia mearnsii and Acacia dealbata.
