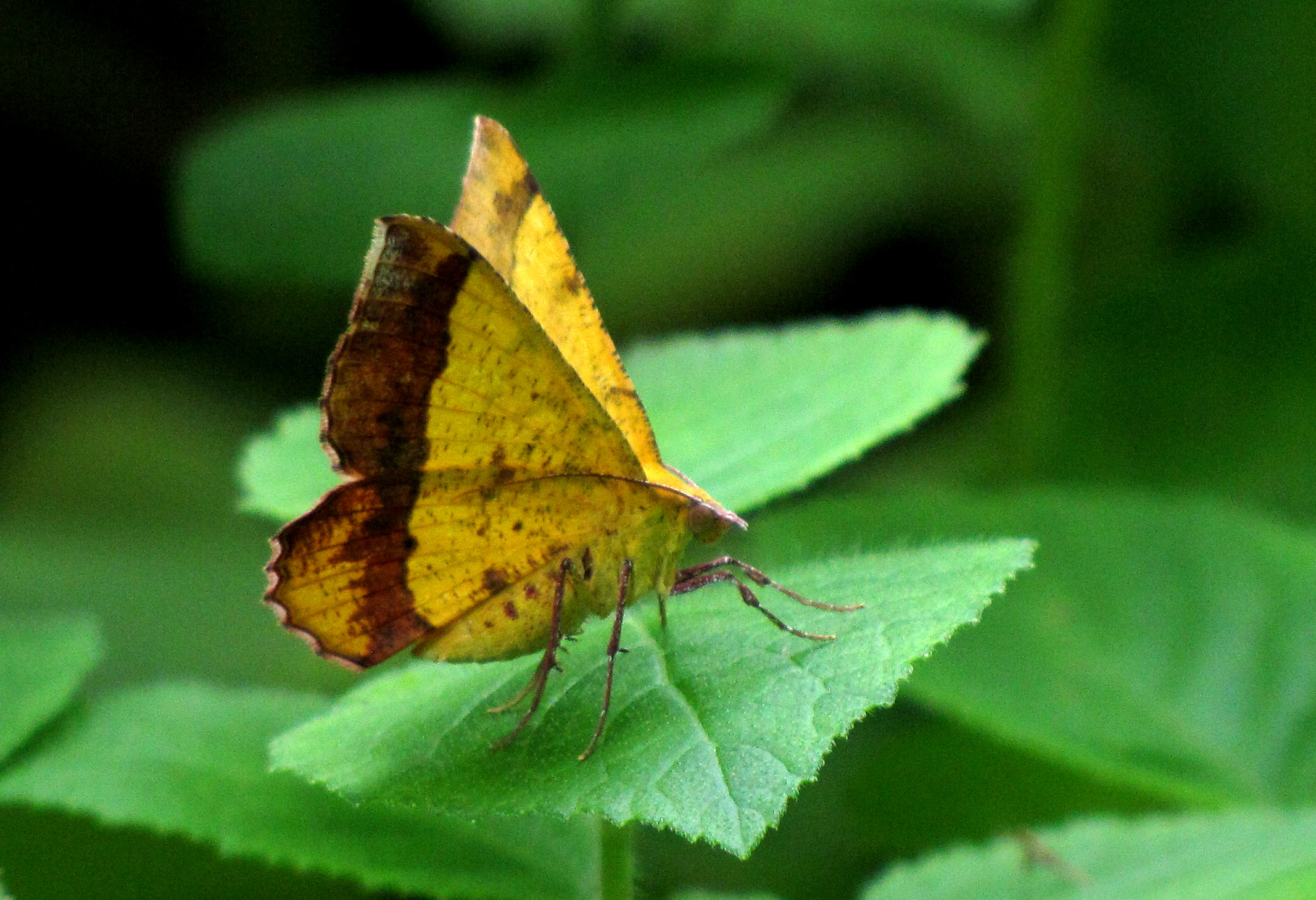

Scientific classification
- Kingdom: Animalia
- Phylum: Arthropoda
- Class: Insecta
- Order: Lepidoptera
- Family: Geometridae
- Tribe: Caberini
- Genus: Hyperythra; Guenée in Boisduval & Guenée, 1857

Synonyms
- Tycoonia Warren, 1894; Pseuderythra Swinhoe, 1894; Callipona Turner, 1904

= Hyperythra =

Genus of moths

Hyperythra is a genus of moths in the family Geometridae. It was erected by Achille Guenée in 1857.

== Description ==
Palpi hairy and reaching well beyond the frons. A sharp frontal tuft. Antennae of male bipectinate (comb like on both sides) to two-thirds length. Fore tibia with large process. Forewings of male typically with a slight fovea below base of median nervure. The apex somewhat acute. Vein 3 from angle of cell and veins 7 to 10 stalked, from near upper angle. Vein 11 free. Hindwings with outer margin crenulate (scalloped) and vein 3 from angle of cell. In some American species, males have a large membraneous vesicle at base of hindwing below, and no fovea to forewings.

== Species ==
- Hyperythra lutea (Stoll, [1781])
- Hyperythra obliqua (Warren, 1894)
- Hyperythra phoenix Swinhoe, 1891
- Hyperythra rubricata Warren, 1898
- Hyperythra suspectaria (Walker, 1866)
- Hyperythra swinhoei Butler, 1880
