= Taeniogramma =

Scientific classification
- Kingdom: Animalia
- Phylum: Arthropoda
- Class: Insecta
- Order: Lepidoptera
- Family: Geometridae
- Tribe: Cassymini
- Genus: Taeniogramma; Dognin, 1914

Genus of moths

Taeniogramma is a genus of moths in the family Geometridae erected by Paul Dognin in 1914.

== Species ==
- Taeniogramma odrussa (Druce, 1892) Mexico, Guatemala, Costa Rica
- Taeniogramma costimacula Dognin, 1914 Panama
- Taeniogramma punctolineata (Dognin, 1902) Ecuador
- Taeniogramma melanorrhoea (Dyar, 1913) Mexico
- Taeniogramma lineata (Dognin, 1913) Colombia
- Taeniogramma paulensis (Schaus, 1901) Brazil (São Paulo)
- Taeniogramma quadrilinea (Schaus, 1901) Arizona, Mexico
- Taeniogramma octolineata (Hulst, 1887) Arizona
- Taeniogramma mendicata (Hulst, 1887) southern Arizona, southern New Mexico, Texas
- Taeniogramma tenebrosata (Hulst, 1887) Arizona, New Mexico, southern California, Mexico
