= Telletrurona =

Scientific classification
- Kingdom: Animalia
- Phylum: Arthropoda
- Class: Insecta
- Order: Lepidoptera
- Family: Geometridae
- Genus: Telletrurona

Genus of moths

Telletrurona is a genus of moths in the family Geometridae.
