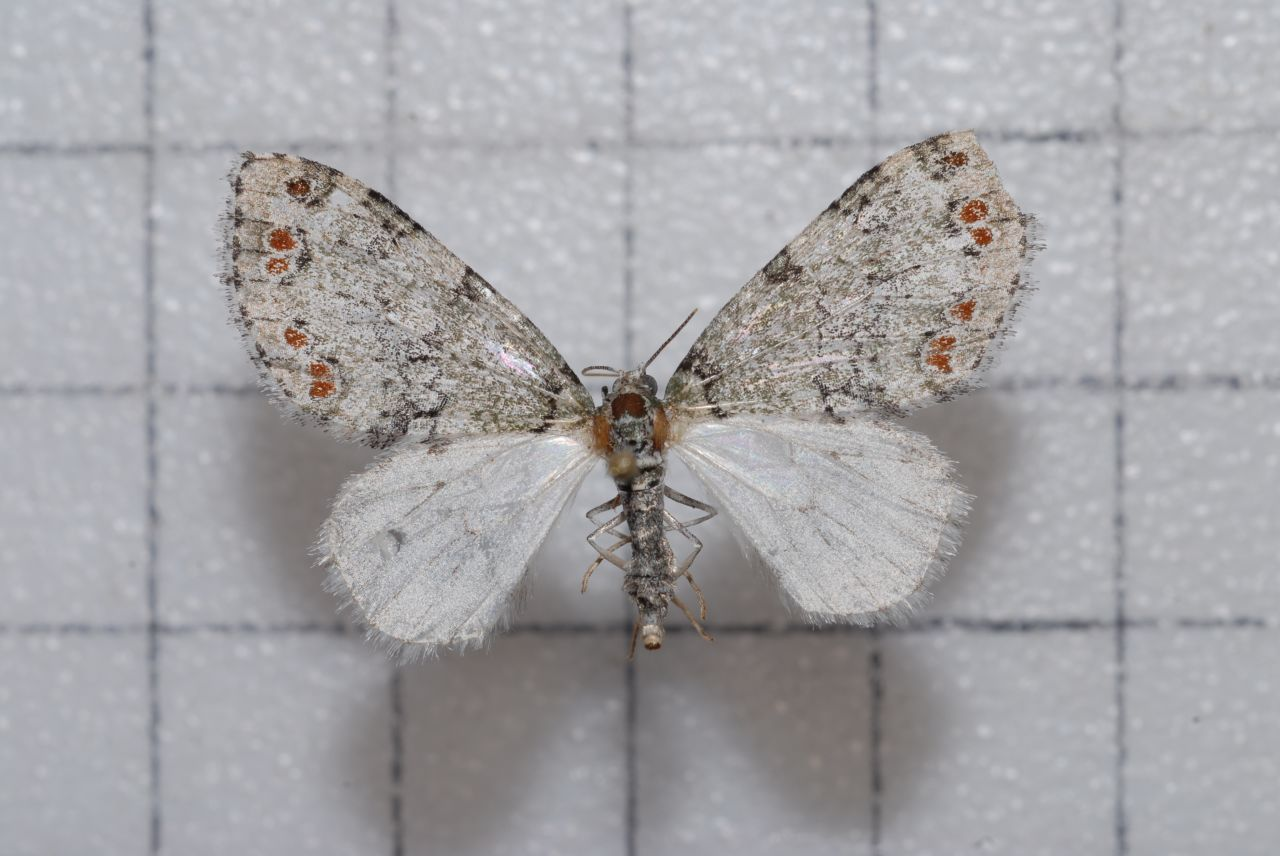
- Trichopterigia kishidai

Scientific classification
- Kingdom: Animalia
- Phylum: Arthropoda
- Class: Insecta
- Order: Lepidoptera
- Family: Geometridae
- Subfamily: Larentiinae
- Genus: Trichopterigia; Hampson, 1895

Synonyms
- Trichopterigia Hampson, 1895

= Trichopterigia =

Genus of moths

Trichopterigia is a genus of moths in the family Geometridae erected by George Hampson in 1895.

== Species ==
- Trichopterigia adorabilis Yazaki, 1987
- Trichopterigia adiopa Prout, 1958
- Trichopterigia albipunctata Yazaki, 1993
- Trichopterigia atrofasciata Yashimoto, 1995
- Trichopterigia cerinaria Xue, 1992
- Trichopterigia consobrinaria Leech, 1891
- Trichopterigia costipunctaria Leech, 1897
- Trichopterigia decorata Moore, 1888
- Trichopterigia dejeani Prout, 1958
- Trichopterigia fulvifasciata Yazaki, 1993
- Trichopterigia hagna Prout, 1958
- Trichopterigia harutai Yazaki, 1993
- Trichopterigia illumina Prout, 1958
- Trichopterigia kishidai Yazaki, 1987
- Trichopterigia macularia Moore, 1868
- Trichopterigia melanogramma Yazaki, 1993
- Trichopterigia miantosticta Prout, 1958
- Trichopterigia minuta Inoue, 1992
- Trichopterigia nepalensis Yazaki, 1993
- Trichopterigia nigrisculpta Warren, 1897
- Trichopterigia nigronotata Warren, 1893
- Trichopterigia nivocellata Bastelberger, 1911
- Trichopterigia pilcheri Prout, 1958
- Trichopterigia placida Yazaki, 1993
- Trichopterigia rivularis Warren, 1893
  - Trichopterigia rivularis acidnias Prout, 1958
- Trichopterigia rubripuncta Wileman, 1916
- Trichopterigia rufinotata Butler, 1889
- Trichopterigia sanguinipunctata Warren, 1893
- Trichopterigia sphenorrhyma Prout, 1926
- Trichopterigia superba Yazaki, 1993
- Trichopterigia teligera Prout, 1958
- Trichopterigia ustimargo Warren, 1896
- Trichopterigia viridilineata Hashimoto, 1995
- Trichopterigia yoshimotoi Yazaki, 1987
