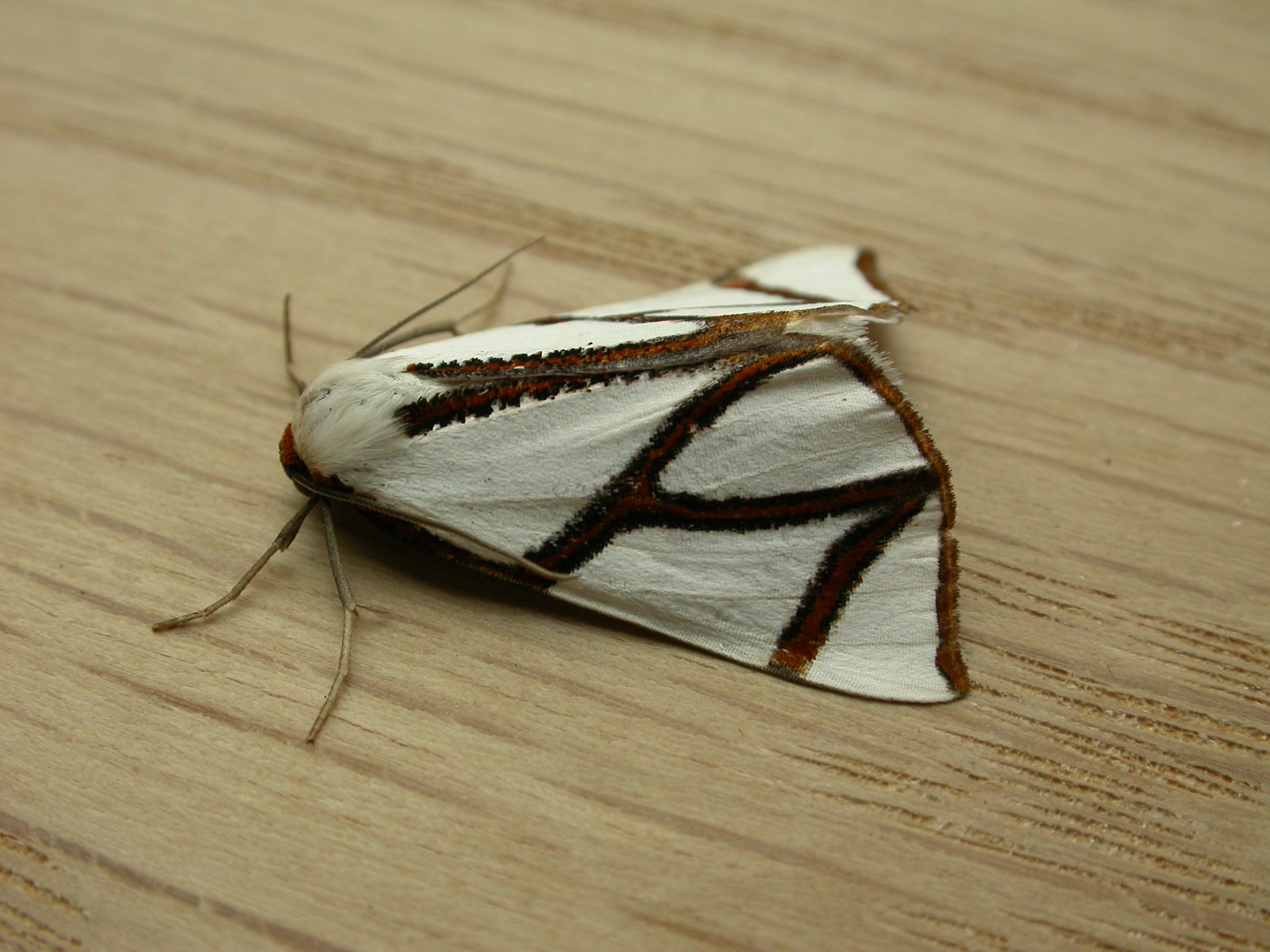

Scientific classification
- Kingdom: Animalia
- Phylum: Arthropoda
- Class: Insecta
- Order: Lepidoptera
- Family: Geometridae
- Tribe: Nacophorini
- Genus: Thalaina; Walker, June 1855

Synonyms
- Absyrtes Guenée, 1858; Macqueenia Turner, 1947; Plusargyria Herrich-Schäffer, 1855; Thalainodes Lower, 1902

= Thalaina =

Genus of moths

Thalaina is a genus of moths in the family Geometridae first described by Francis Walker in 1855.

== Species ==
Species include:

- Thalaina allochroa Lower, 1902
- Thalaina angulosa Walker, 1865
- Thalaina clara Walker, 1855
- Thalaina inscripta Walker, 1855
- Thalaina kimba McQuillan, 1981
- Thalaina macfarlandi Wilson, 1972
- Thalaina paronycha Lower, 1900
- Thalaina selenaea Doubleday, 1845
- Thalaina tetraclada Lower, 1900
