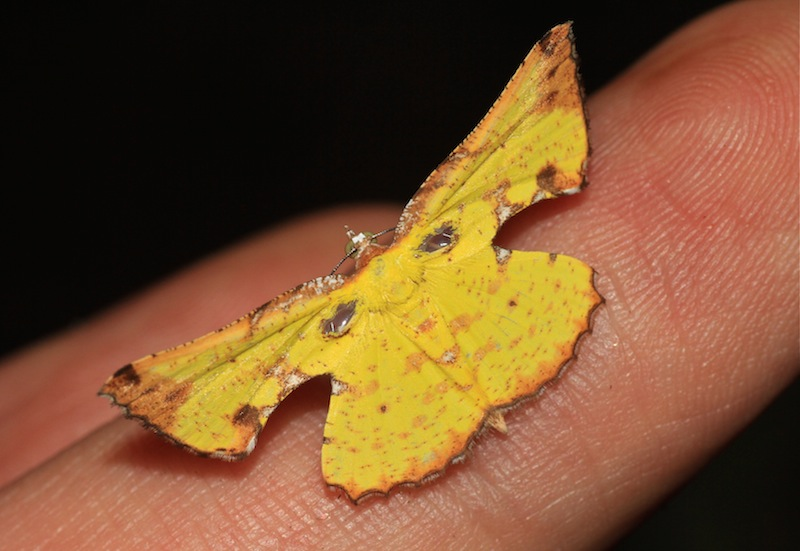
- Corymica pryeri

Scientific classification
- Kingdom: Animalia
- Phylum: Arthropoda
- Class: Insecta
- Order: Lepidoptera
- Family: Geometridae
- Subfamily: Ennominae
- Genus: Corymica; Walker, 1860

Synonyms
- Caprilia Walker, 1866; Thiopsyche Butler, 1878

= Corymica =

Genus of moths

Corymica is a genus of moths in the family Geometridae described by Francis Walker in 1860.

== Description ==
Palpi reaching well beyond the frons and fringed with hair. Antennae of male ciliated. Hind tibia not dilated. Forewings of male with a very large fovea of hyaline membrane. The apex acute and somewhat rounded. The outer margin crenulate (scolloped) near the apex. Inner margin highly excised from middle to outer angle. Vein 3 from before angle of cell. Veins 7, 8 and 9 stalked and vein 10 absent. Vein 11 anastomosing (fusing) with vein 12 and connected with vein 8 and 9. Hindwings with costa excised beyond middle. Vein 3 from before angle of cell.

== Species ==
- Corymica arnearia Walker, 1860
- Corymica deducta (Walker, 1866)
- Corymica latimarginata Swinhoe, 1902
- Corymica pardalota Prout, 1931
- Corymica pryeri (Butler, 1878)
- Corymica specularia (Moore, [1868])
- Corymica vesicularia (Walker, 1866)
