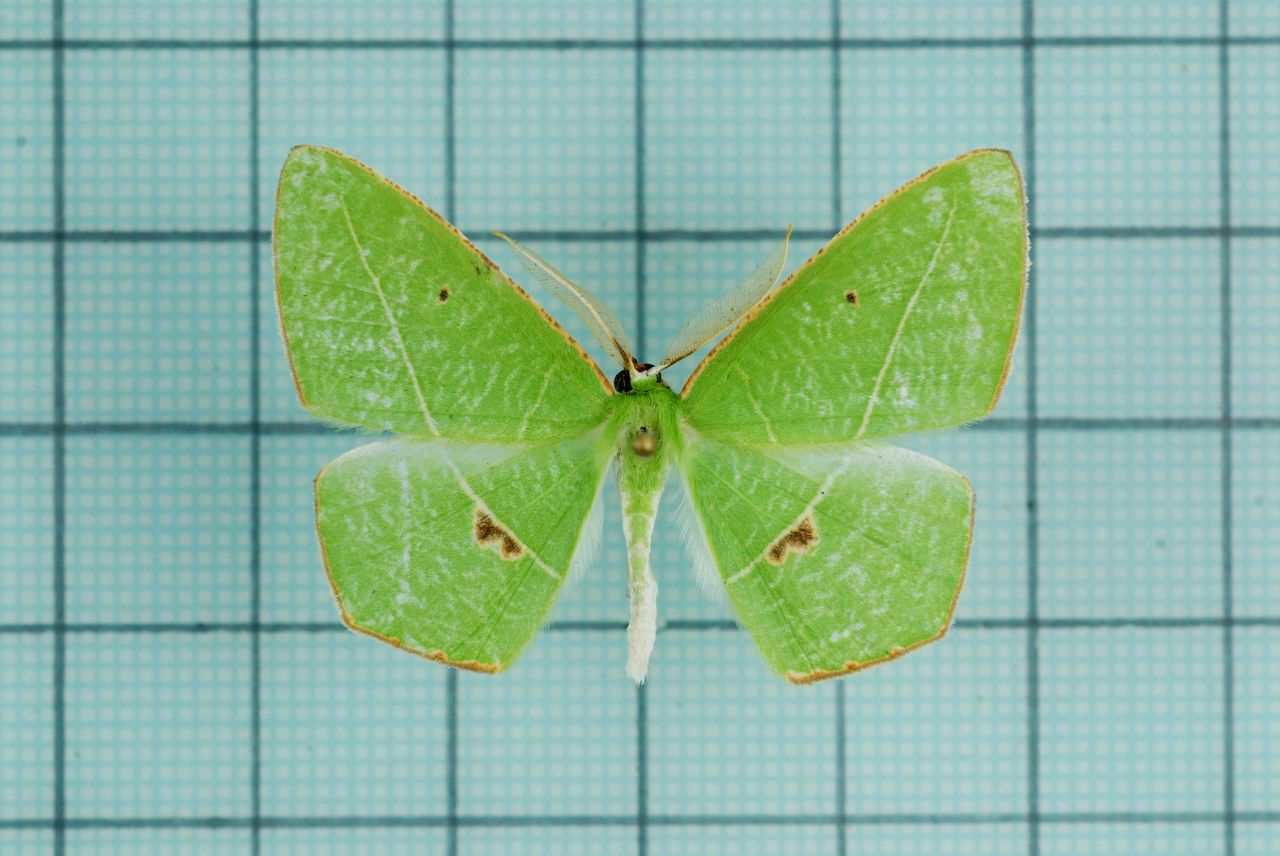
- Tanaoctenia haliaria

Scientific classification
- Kingdom: Animalia
- Phylum: Arthropoda
- Class: Insecta
- Order: Lepidoptera
- Family: Geometridae
- Subfamily: Ennominae
- Genus: Tanaoctenia; Warren, 1894

= Tanaoctenia =

Genus of moths

Tanaoctenia is a genus of moths in the family Geometridae.

== Species ==
- Tanaoctenia dehaliaria (Wehrli, 1936)
- Tanaoctenia haliaria (Walker, 1861)
