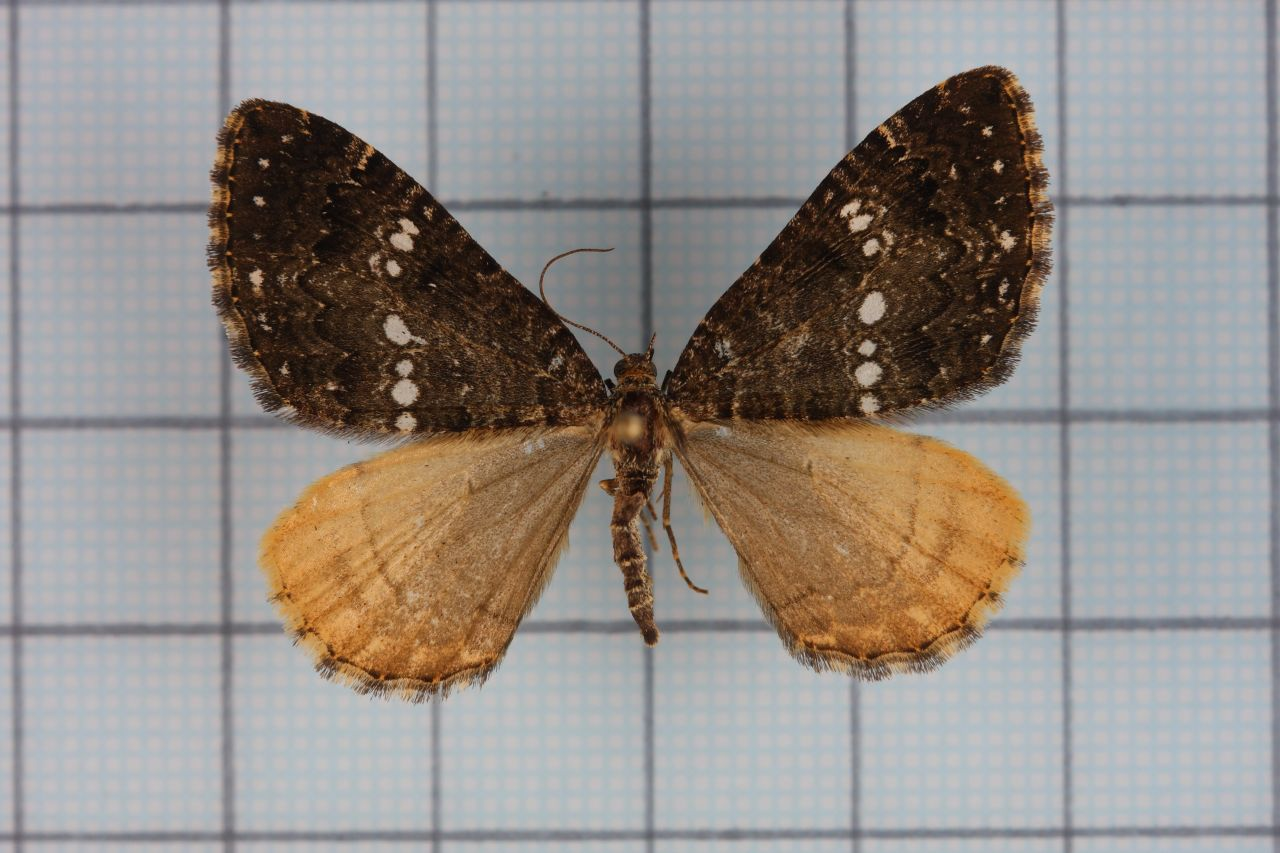
- Trichoplites albimaculosa

Scientific classification
- Kingdom: Animalia
- Phylum: Arthropoda
- Class: Insecta
- Order: Lepidoptera
- Family: Geometridae
- Subfamily: Larentiinae
- Genus: Trichoplites; Swinhoe, 1900

= Trichoplites =

Genus of moths

Trichoplites is a genus of moths in the family Geometridae.

== Species ==
- Trichoplites albimaculosa Inoue, 1978
- Trichoplites cuprearia (Moore, 1868)
- Trichoplites ingressa Prout, 1939
- Trichoplites lateritiata (Moore, 1888)
- Trichoplites latifasciaria (Leech, 1897)
- Trichoplites moupinata (Poujade, 1895)
- Trichoplites tryphema Prout, 1934
