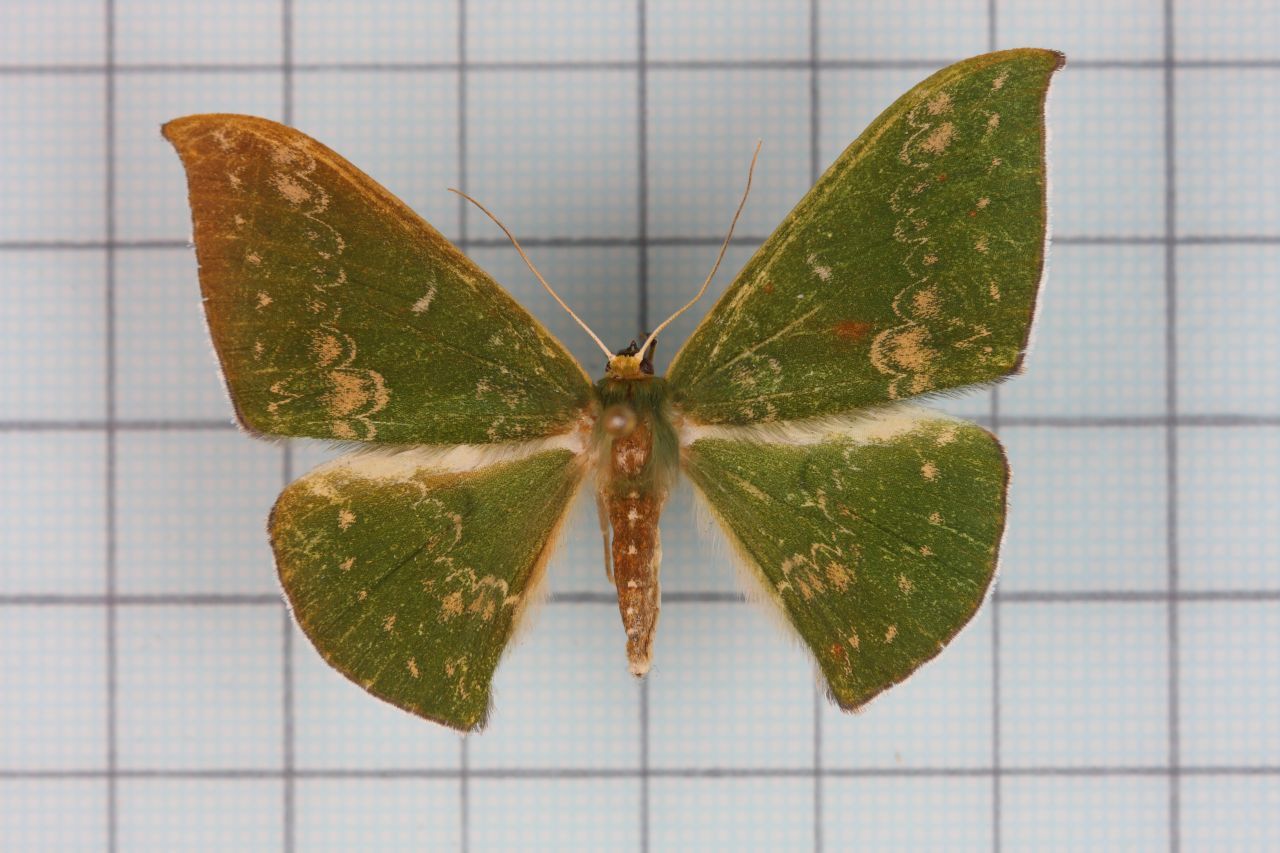
- Tanaorhinus formosana

Scientific classification
- Kingdom: Animalia
- Phylum: Arthropoda
- Class: Insecta
- Order: Lepidoptera
- Family: Geometridae
- Genus: Tanaorhinus; Butler, 1879

= Tanaorhinus =

Genus of moths

Tanaorhinus is a genus of moths in the family Geometridae. It was described by Butler in 1879.

== Species ==
- Tanaorhinus baruensis Orhant, 2014
- Tanaorhinus celebensis Yazaki, 1995
- Tanaorhinus dohertyi Prout, 1932
- Tanaorhinus formosana Okano, 1959
- Tanaorhinus guitinguensis Tautel, 2014
- Tanaorhinus kina Swinhoe, 1893 [misplaced per Plotkin & Kawahara 2020]
- Tanaorhinus luteivirgatus
- Tanaorhinus malayanus Inoue, 1992
- Tanaorhinus philippinensis Yazaki, 1995
- Tanaorhinus rafflesii (Moore, 1860)
- Tanaorhinus reciprocata (Walker, 1861)
- Tanaorhinus sultan Tautel, 2014
- Tanaorhinus tibeta Chu, 1982
- Tanaorhinus unipuncta Warren, 1899
- Tanaorhinus viridiluteata (Walker, 1861)
- Tanaorhinus waterstradti Prout, 1933
