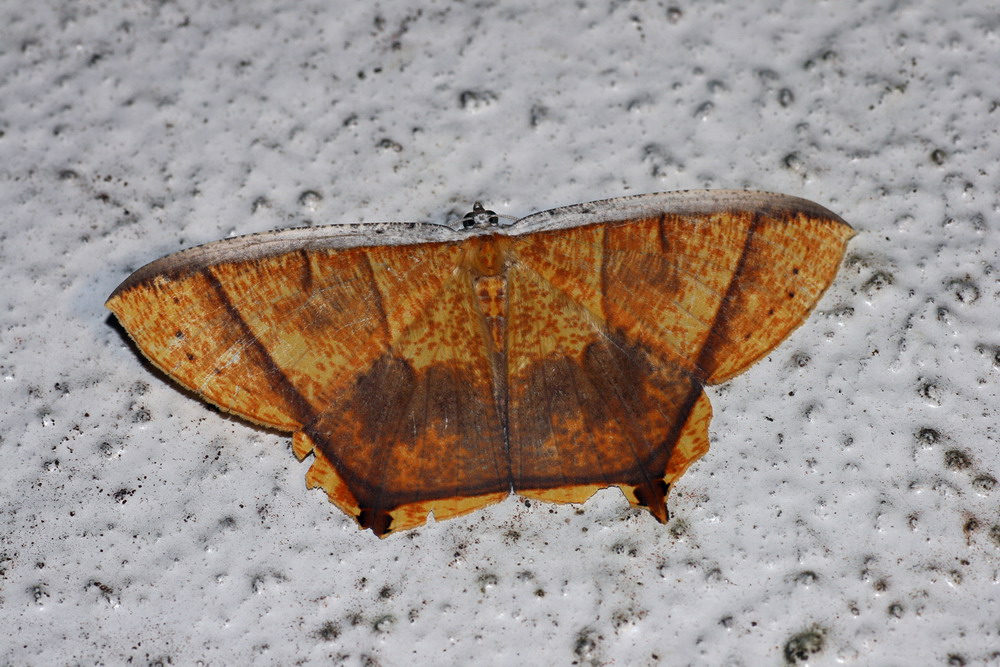
- Thinopteryx crocoptera

Scientific classification
- Domain: Eukaryota
- Kingdom: Animalia
- Phylum: Arthropoda
- Class: Insecta
- Order: Lepidoptera
- Family: Geometridae
- Subfamily: Ennominae
- Genus: Thinopteryx; Butler, 1883

= Thinopteryx =

Genus of moths

Thinopteryx is a genus of moths in the family Geometridae erected by Arthur Gardiner Butler in 1883.

== Description ==
Antennae of male fasciculate (bundled) with slightly longer palpi. Forewings with more produced apex. Vein 3 from before angle of cell and veins 7 to 9 from before upper angle. Vein 10 present and given off from vein 11 after anastomosing (fusing) with vein 12. Hindwings with angled outer margin below apex, and tailed at vein 4. Vein 3 from before angle of cell.

== Species ==
- Thinopteryx crocoptera (Kollar, [1844]) India - China, Korea, Japan, Sundaland
- Thinopteryx praetoraria (Felder, 1875) Sulawesi, Philippines
- Thinopteryx nebulosa Butler, 1883 India, Sumatra, Java, Borneo
- Thinopteryx citrina Warren, 1894 Sikkim in northern India
