= Tanagridia =

Scientific classification
- Kingdom: Animalia
- Phylum: Arthropoda
- Class: Insecta
- Order: Lepidoptera
- Family: Geometridae
- Genus: Tanagridia; Butler, 1882
- Species: T. fusca

Binomial name
- Tanagridia fusca Butler, 1882

Genus of moths

Tanagridia is a monotypic moth genus in the family Geometridae. The only species is Tanagridia fusca, which is found in Patagonia. Both the genus and species were first described by Arthur Gardiner Butler in 1882.
