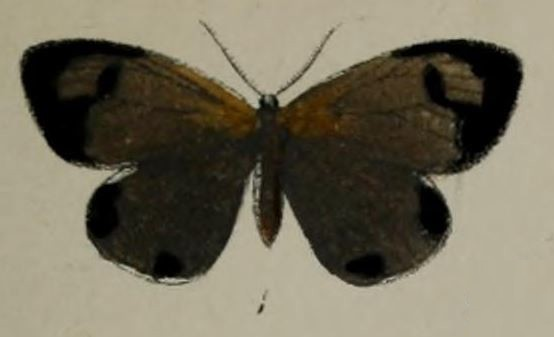
- Terina octogesa

Scientific classification
- Kingdom: Animalia
- Phylum: Arthropoda
- Class: Insecta
- Order: Lepidoptera
- Family: Geometridae
- Subfamily: Ennominae
- Genus: Terina; Walker, 1854

Type species
- Terina latifascia Walker, 1854

Synonyms
- Agirpa Warren, 1894; Amnemopsyche Butler, 1869; Girpa Walker, 1865; Torina Walker, 1856

= Terina (moth) =

Genus of moths

Terina is a genus of moths in the family Geometridae erected by Francis Walker in 1854.

== Species ==
Some species of this genus are:

- Terina albidaria (Fabricius, 1787)
- Terina charmione (Fabricius, 1793)
- Terina chrysoptera Hampson, 1909
- Terina circumcincta L. B. Prout, 1915
- Terina circumdata (Walker, 1865)
- Terina crocea Hampson, 1910
- Terina doleris (Plötz, 1880)
- Terina flaviorsa (L. B. Prout, 1934)
- Terina internata (Warren, 1909)
- Terina latifascia Walker, 1854
- Terina maculifera Strand, 1911
- Terina niphanda Druce, 1887
- Terina ochricosta (Rebel, 1914)
- Terina octogesa (Druce, 1887)
- Terina overlaeti L. B. Prout, 1932
- Terina puncticorpus Warren, 1897
- Terina reliqua L. B. Prout, 1925
- Terina renifera Warren, 1897
- Terina rogersi L. B. Prout, 1915
- Terina sanguinarea Bethune-Baker, 1911
- Terina subfulva (Warren, 1905)
- Terina tanyeces L. B. Prout, 1921
- Terina wardi Sharpe, 1891
