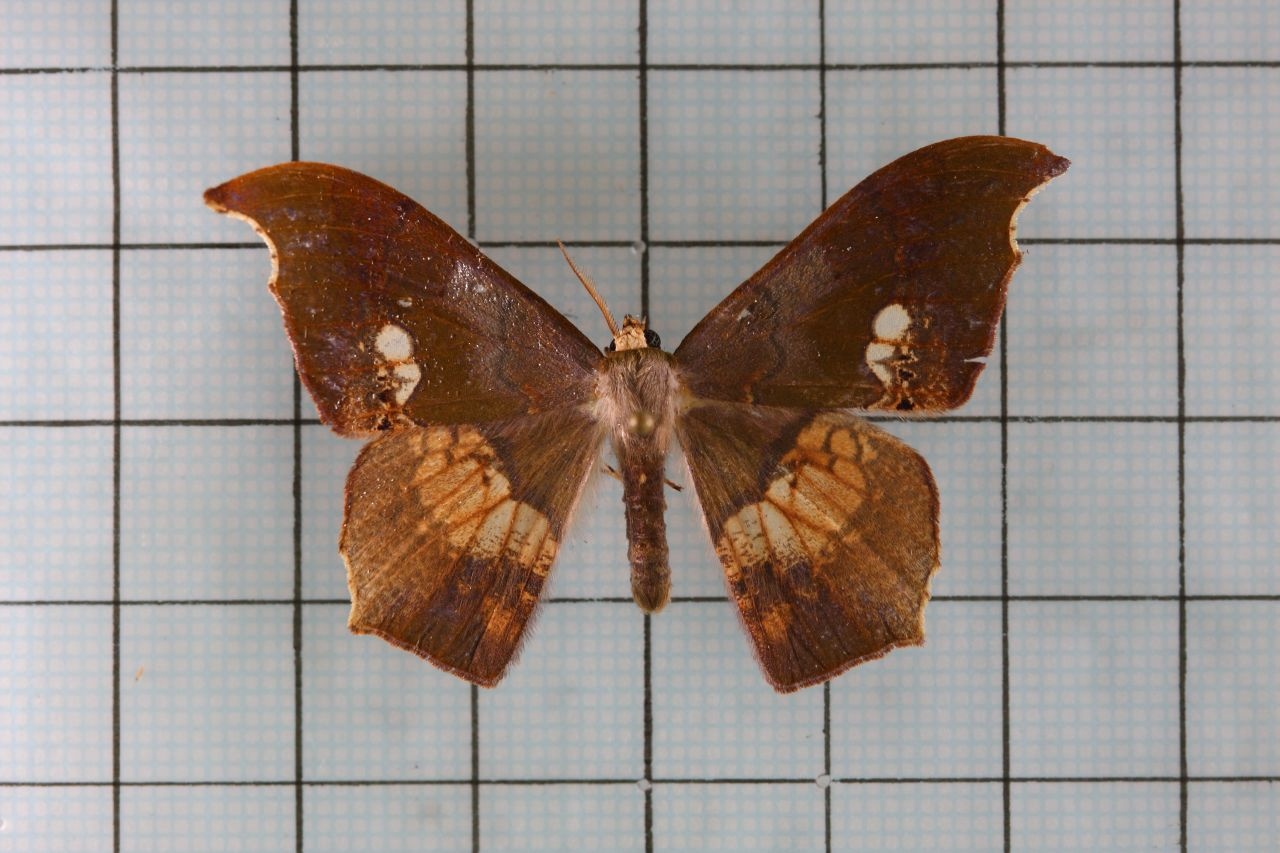
- Timandromorpha discolor

Scientific classification
- Kingdom: Animalia
- Phylum: Arthropoda
- Class: Insecta
- Order: Lepidoptera
- Family: Geometridae
- Subfamily: Geometrinae
- Genus: Timandromorpha; Inoue, 1944

= Timandromorpha =

Genus of moths

Timandromorpha is a genus of moths in the family Geometridae.

== Species ==
- Timandromorpha discolor (Warren, 1896)
- Timandromorpha energes (Prout, 1933)
- Timandromorpha enervata Inoue, 1944
