= Tarma (moth) =

Scientific classification
- Kingdom: Animalia
- Phylum: Arthropoda
- Class: Insecta
- Order: Lepidoptera
- Family: Geometridae
- Tribe: Nacophorini
- Genus: Tarma

Genus of moths

Tarma is a genus of moth in the family Geometridae.
