= Axiagasta =

Axiagasta may refer to:

- Axiagasta (fungus moth) Meyrick, 1930, a monotypic genus of fungus moth in family Tineidae
- Axiagasta (geometer moth) Turner, 1930, a genus of geometer moth in subfamily Oenochrominae
