= Phallaria =

Phallaria is the scientific name of two genera of organisms and may refer to:

- Phallaria (moth), a genus of moths in the Geometridae
- Phallaria (plant), a genus of plants in the Rubiaceae
