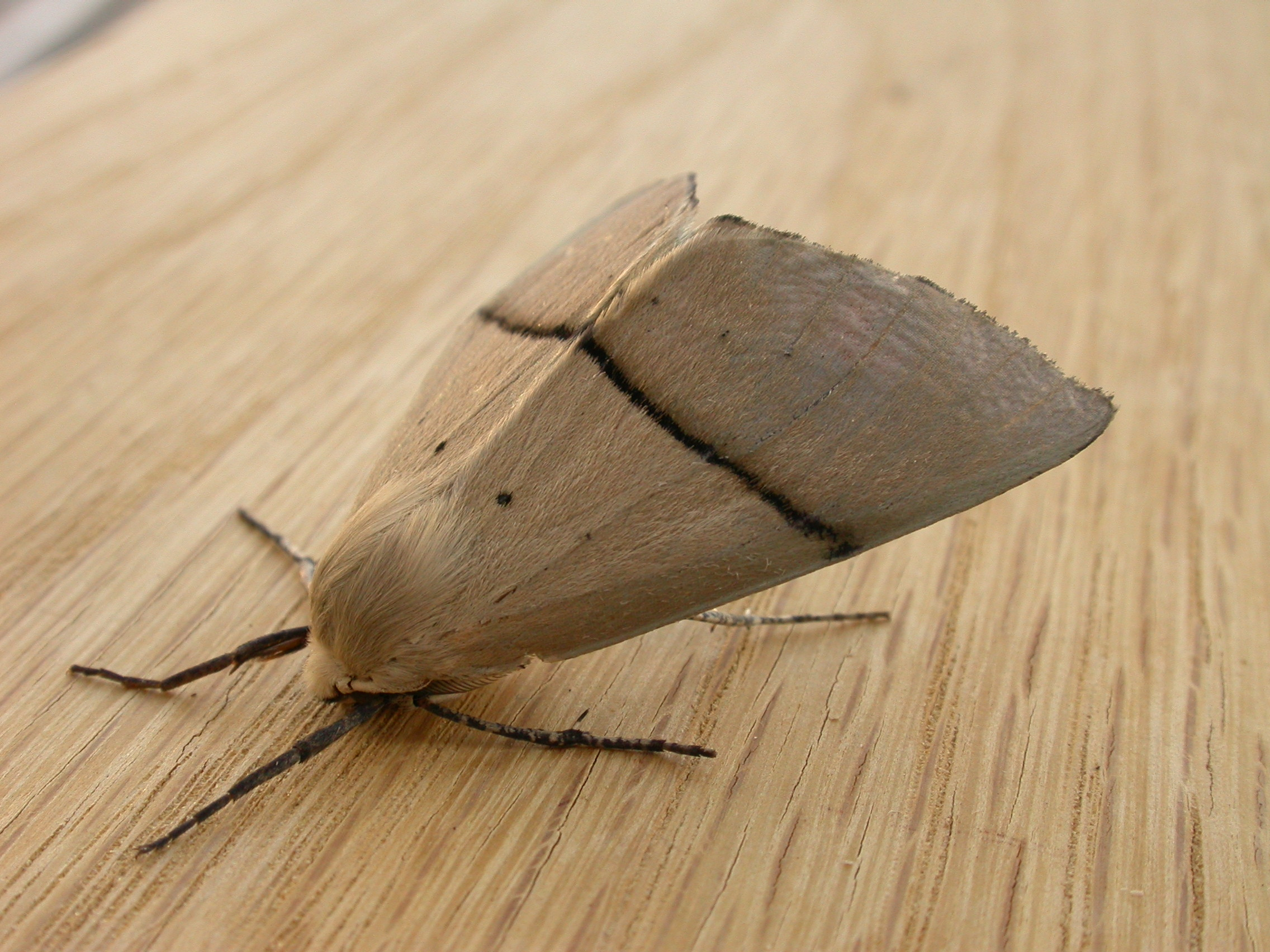

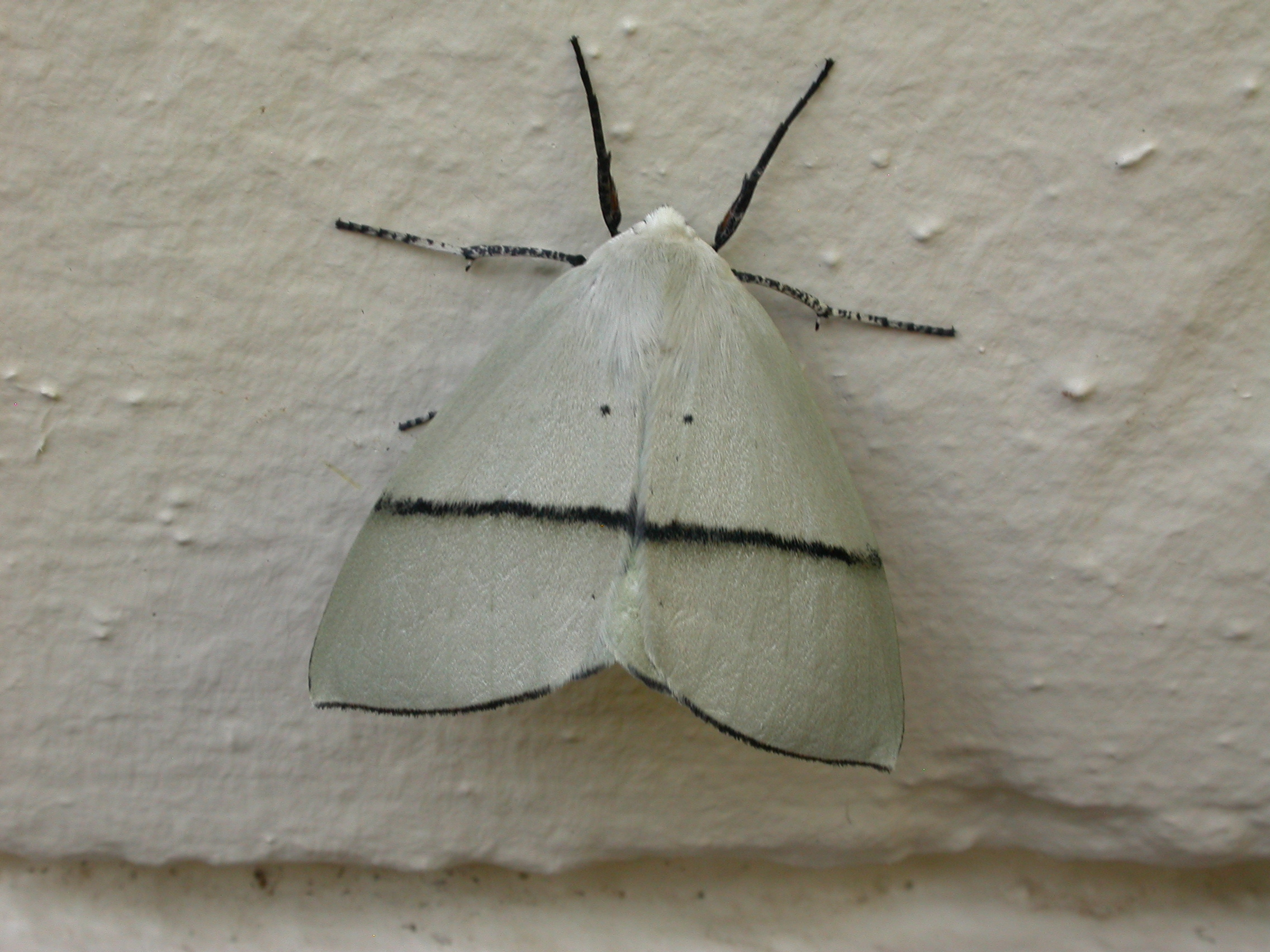

Scientific classification
- Kingdom: Animalia
- Phylum: Arthropoda
- Class: Insecta
- Order: Lepidoptera
- Family: Geometridae
- Subfamily: Oenochrominae
- Genus: Gastrophora; Guenée, 1857
- Species: G. henricaria

Binomial name
- Gastrophora henricaria (Guenée, 1857)

= Gastrophora =

Genus of moths

Gastrophora is a monotypic moth genus in the family Geometridae. Its only species, Gastrophora henricaria, the fallen bark looper or beautiful leaf moth, is found in the south-east corner of Australia. Both the genus and species were first described by Achille Guenée in 1857.

The wingspan is about 50 mm.

The larvae feed on Eucalyptus species and Lophostemon confertus.
