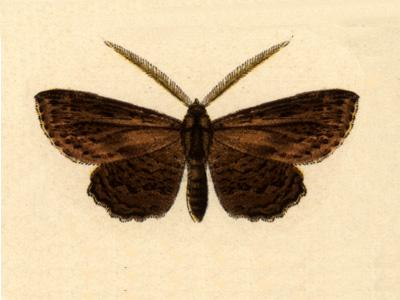

Scientific classification
- Domain: Eukaryota
- Kingdom: Animalia
- Phylum: Arthropoda
- Class: Insecta
- Order: Lepidoptera
- Family: Geometridae
- Genus: Ergavia
- Species: E. subrufa

Binomial name
- Ergavia subrufa (Warren, 1897)

Synonyms
- Almodes subrufa Warren, 1897

= Ergavia subrufa =

Species of moth

Ergavia subrufa is a moth of the family Geometridae. It is found on Jamaica.
