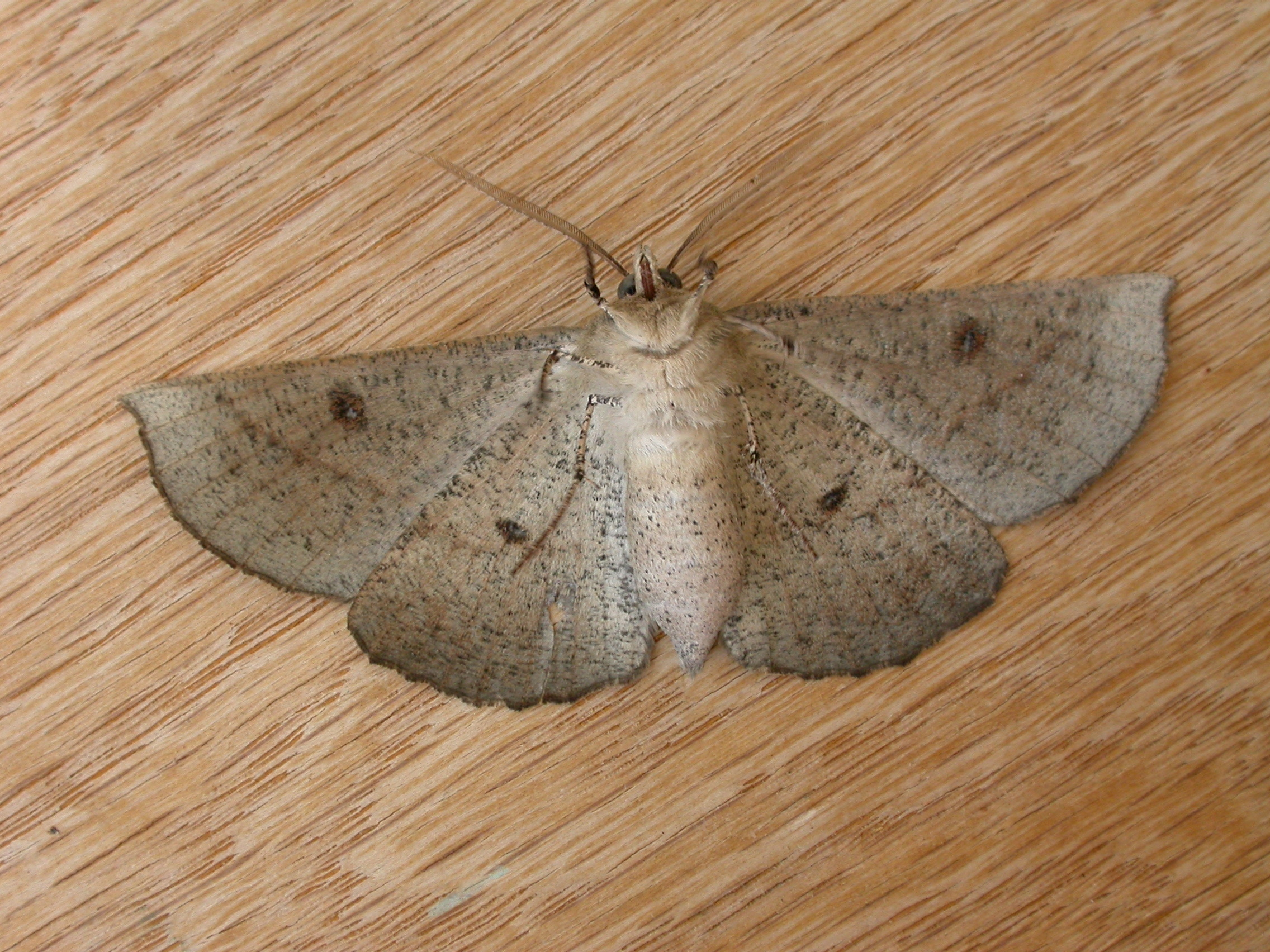
- Phallaria ophiusaria

Scientific classification
- Kingdom: Animalia
- Phylum: Arthropoda
- Clade: Pancrustacea
- Class: Insecta
- Order: Lepidoptera
- Family: Geometridae
- Subfamily: Oenochrominae

= Oenochrominae =

Subfamily of moths

Oenochrominae is a subfamily of the moth family Geometridae.

== Genera ==
- Abraxaphantes Warren, 1894
- Adeixis Warren, 1897
- Adesmobathra Prout, 1916
- Afrophyla Warren, 1895
- Aglossophanes Turner, 1942
- Ametris Hübner, 1822
- Antasia Warren, 1894
- Antictenia Prout, 1910
- Apotheta Turner, 1931
- Arcina Walker, 1863
- Arhodia Guenée, 1857
- Aspilonaxa Warren, 1897
- Axiagasta Turner, 1930
- Barrama Warren, 1897
- Carmala Walker, 1863
- Cathaemacta Turner, 1929
- Cernia Walker, 1860
- Chrysotaenia Herrich-Schäffer, 1856
- Circopetes Prout, 1910
- Cortixa Schaus, 1901
- Debos Swinhoe, 1885
- Dichromodes Guenée, 1857
- Dicyclodes Warren, 1906
- Dinophalus Prout, 1910
- Drepanopterula Hedicke, 1923
- Ecphyas Turner, 1929
- Enchocrana Turner, 1930
- Entogonia Warren, 1904
- Epidesmia Duncan [& Westwood], 1841
- Epirranthis Hübner, 1823
- Ergavia Walker, 1866
- Eumegethes Staudinger, 1898
- Gastrophora Guenée, 1857
- Heteralex Warren, 1894
- Holostixa Swinhoe, 1902
- Homospora Turner, 1904
- Hyphedyle Warren, 1894
- Hypographa Guenée, 1858
- Lissomma Warren, 1905
- Loxorhombia Warren, 1894
- Macrotes Duncan [& Westwood], 1841
- Macroxystra D. S. Fletcher, 1979
- Monoctenia Guenée, 1857
- Myinodes Meyrick, 1892
- Nearcha Guest, 1887
- Neolissomma Goldfinch, 1944
- Norsia Walker, 1867
- Nycticleptes Turner, 1939
- Oenochroma Guenée, 1857
- Omoplatica Turner, 1926
- Onycodes Guenée, 1858
- Palaeodoxa Warren, 1907
- Panulia Warren, 1894
- Paraptychodes Warren, 1894
- Parepisparis Bethune-Baker, 1906
- Petovia Walker, 1854
- Phallaria Guenée, 1857
- Phrataria Walker, 1863
- Phrixocomes Turner, 1930
- Phthorarcha Meyrick, 1892
- Physetostege Warren, 1896
- Racasta Walker, 1861
- Samana Walker, 1863
- Sarcinodes Guenée, 1857
- Satraparchis Meyrick, 1890
- Symphylistis Turner, 1930
- Systatica Turner, 1904
- Tapinogyna Prout, 1910
- Taxeotis Guest, 1887
- Thaumatographe Warren, 1907
- Theoxena Meyrick, 1884
- Trizodes D. S. Fletcher, 1961
- Xenogenes Meyrick, 1910
- Xyridacma Meyrick, 1888
- Zanclopteryx Herrich-Schäffer, 1855
- Zanclorhacos Bastelberger, 1909
- Zeuctophlebia Warren, 1896
