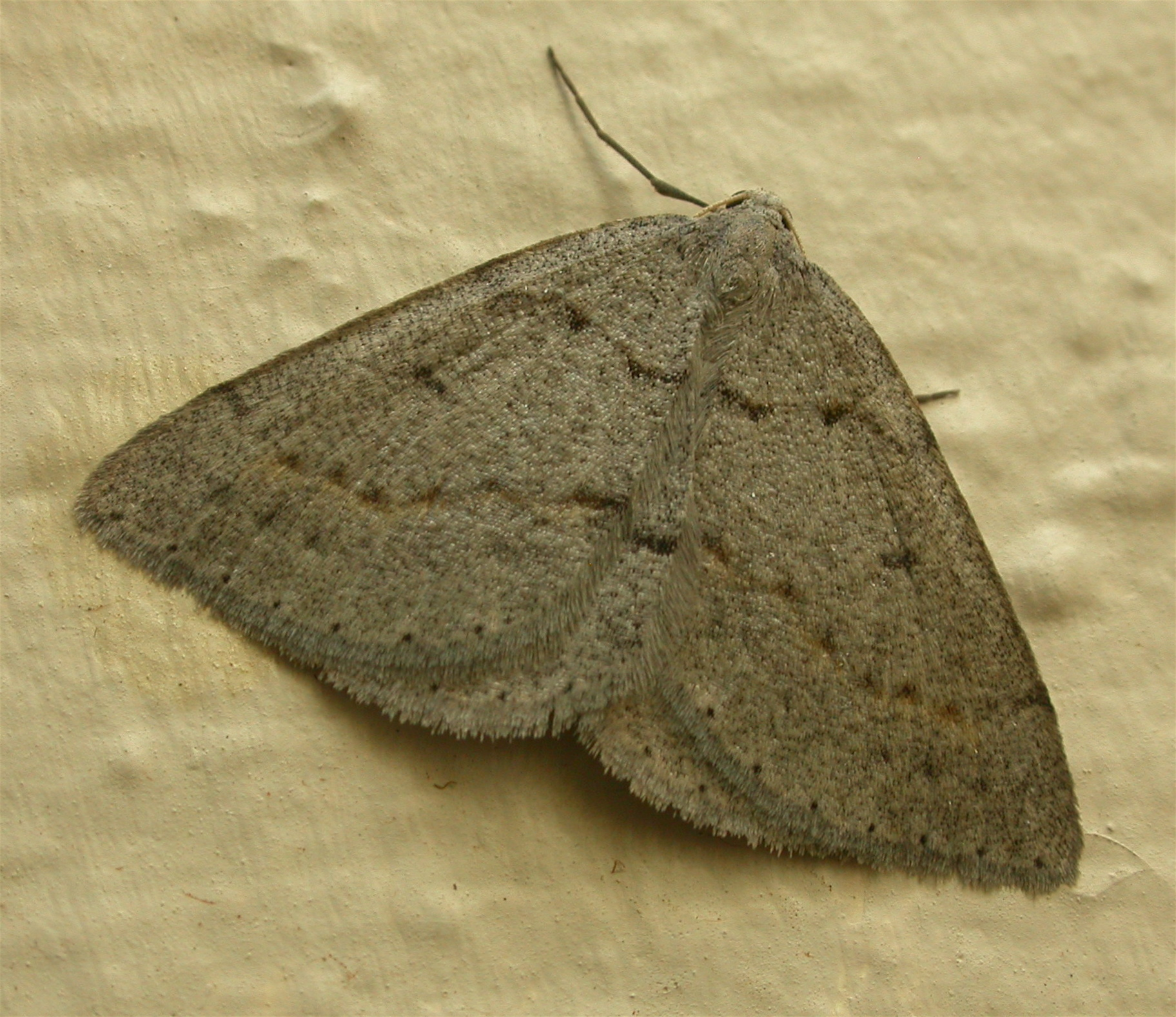

Scientific classification
- Kingdom: Animalia
- Phylum: Arthropoda
- Class: Insecta
- Order: Lepidoptera
- Family: Geometridae
- Genus: Taxeotis
- Species: T. reserata

Binomial name
- Taxeotis reserata Walker, 1860

= Taxeotis reserata =

Species of moth

Taxeotis reserata is a species of moth of the family Geometridae. It is found in Australia, including Tasmania.
