= Homospora =

Scientific classification
- Kingdom: Animalia
- Phylum: Arthropoda
- Class: Insecta
- Order: Lepidoptera
- Family: Geometridae
- Subfamily: Oenochrominae
- Genus: Homospora; Turner, 1904
- Species: H. rhodoscopa

Binomial name
- Homospora rhodoscopa (Lower, 1902)

Synonyms
- Onychodes rhodoscopa Lower, 1902; Homospora procrita Turner, 1904; Homospora lymantriodes Prout, 1913

Genus of moths

Homospora is a monotypic moth genus in the family Geometridae described by Turner in 1904. Its only species, Homospora rhodoscopa, was first described by Oswald Bertram Lower in 1902. It is found in Australia.
