= Norsia =

Scientific classification
- Kingdom: Animalia
- Phylum: Arthropoda
- Class: Insecta
- Order: Lepidoptera
- Family: Geometridae
- Subfamily: Oenochrominae
- Genus: Norsia; Walker, 1867
- Species: N. vincta

Binomial name
- Norsia vincta Walker, 1867

Genus of moths

Norsia is a monotypic moth genus in the family Geometridae described by Francis Walker in 1867. Its only species, Norsia vincta, described by the same author in the same year, is found in Colombia.
