= Antasia =

Scientific classification
- Kingdom: Animalia
- Phylum: Arthropoda
- Clade: Pancrustacea
- Class: Insecta
- Order: Lepidoptera
- Family: Geometridae
- Subfamily: Oenochrominae
- Genus: Antasia; Warren, 1894
- Species: A. flavicapitata

Binomial name
- Antasia flavicapitata (Guenée, 1857)

Synonyms
- Generic: Darantasia Walker, 1863; Specific: Tephrina flavicapitata Guenée, [1858]; Darantasia mundiferaria Walker, [1863]; Tephrina capitata Walker, 1861

Monotypic genus of geometer moths

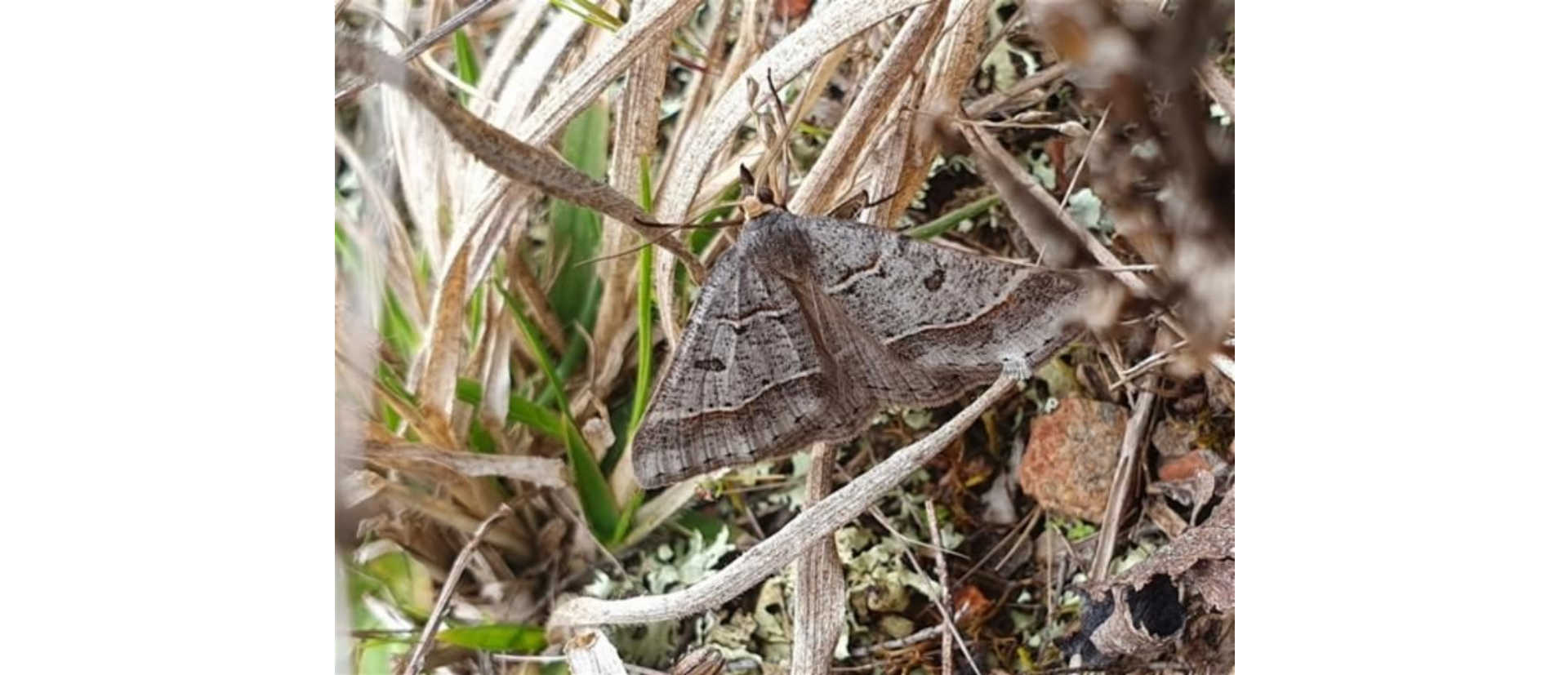
Antasia flavicapitata

Antasia is a monotypic moth genus in the family Geometridae described by Warren in 1894. Its only species, Antasia flavicapitata, was first described by Achille Guenée in 1857. It is found in Australia.
