= Enchocrana =

Scientific classification
- Kingdom: Animalia
- Phylum: Arthropoda
- Class: Insecta
- Order: Lepidoptera
- Family: Geometridae
- Subfamily: Oenochrominae
- Genus: Enchocrana; Turner, 1930
- Species: E. lacista

Binomial name
- Enchocrana lacista Turner, 1930

Genus of moths

Enchocrana is a genus of moths in the family Geometridae. Its only species, Enchocrana lacista, is found in Australia. The genus and species were both first described by Turner in 1930.
