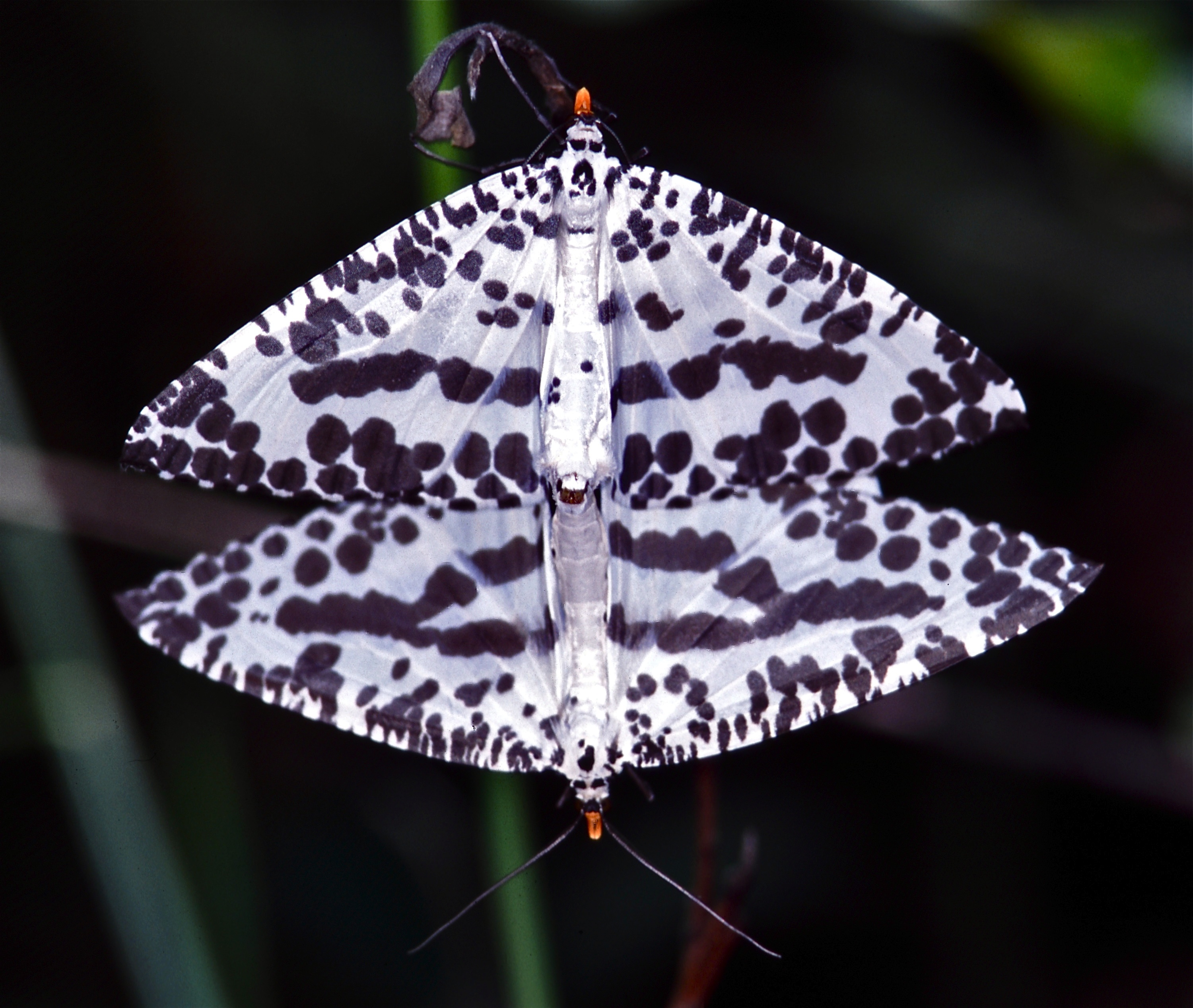
- Mating

Scientific classification
- Kingdom: Animalia
- Phylum: Arthropoda
- Class: Insecta
- Order: Lepidoptera
- Family: Geometridae
- Subfamily: Oenochrominae
- Genus: Abraxaphantes; Warren, 1894
- Species: A. perampla

Binomial name
- Abraxaphantes perampla Swinhoe, 1890

= Abraxaphantes =

Monotypic genus of geometer moths

Abraxaphantes is a monotypic moth genus in the family Geometridae described by Warren in 1890. Its only species, Abraxaphantes perampla, was first described by Charles Swinhoe in 1890.(Swinhoe, 1890) It is found in Myanmar and Thailand.
