= Zeuctophlebia tapinodes =

Scientific classification
- Domain: Eukaryota
- Kingdom: Animalia
- Phylum: Arthropoda
- Class: Insecta
- Order: Lepidoptera
- Family: Geometridae
- Genus: Zeuctophlebia
- Species: Z. tapinodes

Binomial name
- Zeuctophlebia tapinodes Turner, 1904

Species of moth

Zeuctophlebia tapinodes is a species of moth of the family Geometridae. It was described by Alfred Jefferis Turner in 1904 and is known from Australia.
