= Afrophyla =

Scientific classification
- Kingdom: Animalia
- Phylum: Arthropoda
- Clade: Pancrustacea
- Class: Insecta
- Order: Lepidoptera
- Family: Geometridae
- Subfamily: Oenochrominae
- Genus: Afrophyla; Warren, 1895
- Species: A. vethi

Binomial name
- Afrophyla vethi (Snellen, 1886)

Synonyms
- Afrophyla dichordata Warren, 1895

Monotypic genus of geometer moths

Afrophyla is a monotypic moth genus in the family Geometridae described by Warren in 1895. Its only species, Afrophyla vethi, was first described by Snellen in 1886. It is found in eastern Africa.

It has one subspecies, Afrophyla vethi meloui Prout, 1930, which is found in Madagascar.
