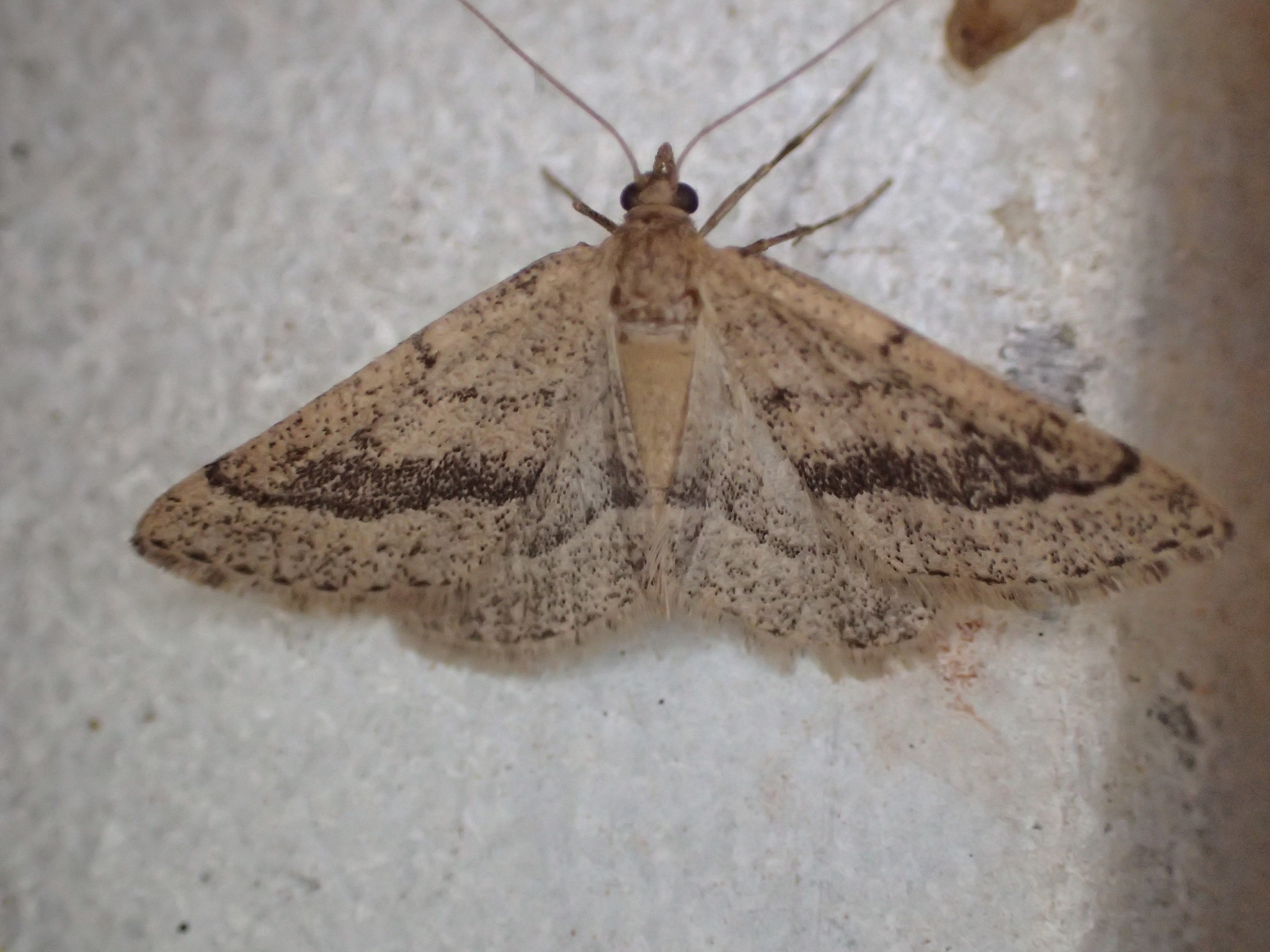
- Aglossophanes adoxima

Scientific classification
- Kingdom: Animalia
- Phylum: Arthropoda
- Clade: Pancrustacea
- Class: Insecta
- Order: Lepidoptera
- Family: Geometridae
- Subfamily: Oenochrominae
- Genus: Aglossophanes; Turner, 1942

= Aglossophanes =

Genus of geometer moths

Aglossophanes is a genus of moths in the family Geometridae.

== Species ==
- Aglossophanes adoxima Turner, 1942
- Aglossophanes pachygramma (Lower, 1893)
