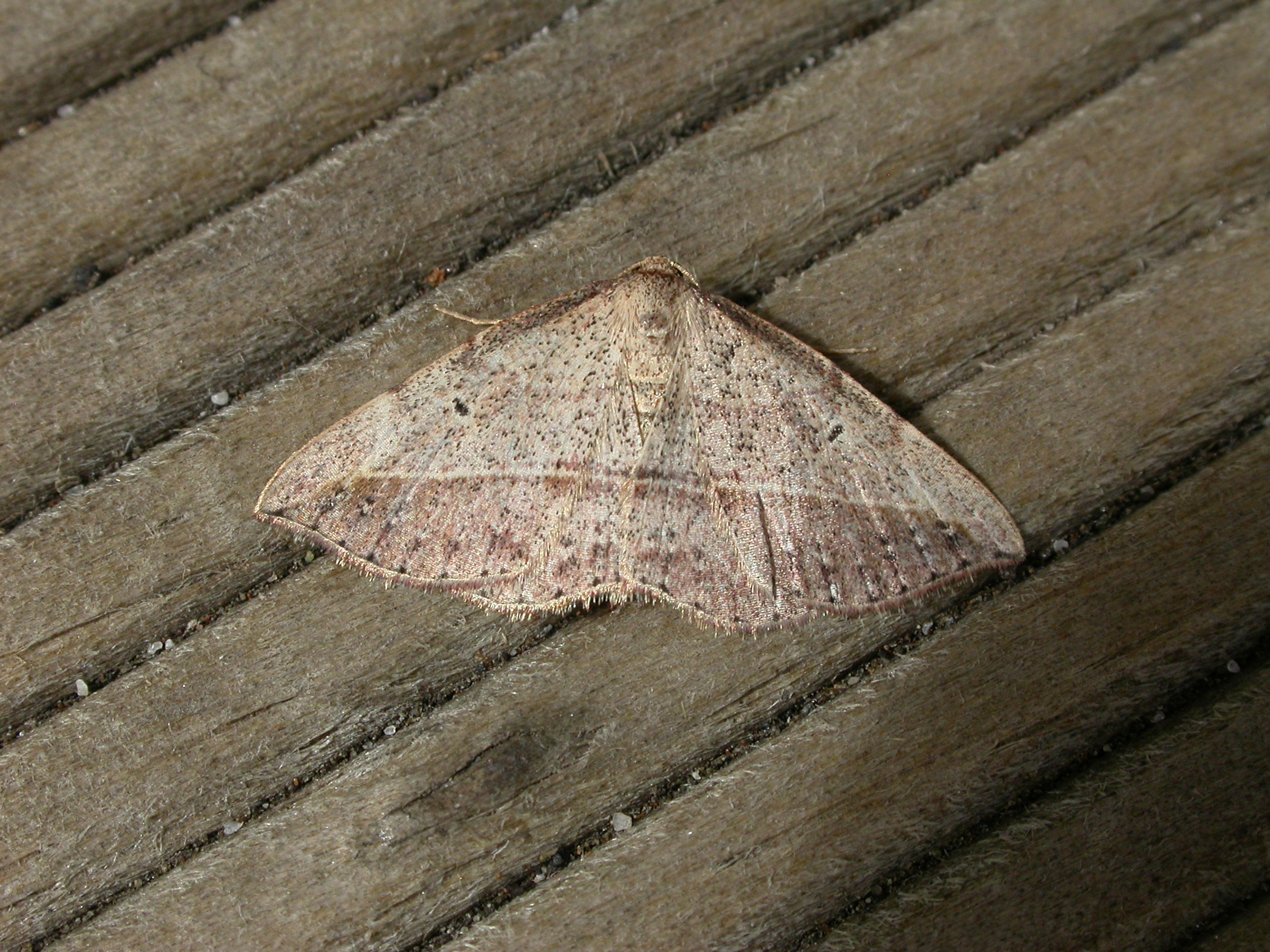
- Zeuctophlebia squalidata (Walker, 1863), Burrill Lake, NSW, February 2012

Scientific classification
- Kingdom: Animalia
- Phylum: Arthropoda
- Class: Insecta
- Order: Lepidoptera
- Family: Geometridae
- Subfamily: Oenochrominae
- Genus: Zeuctophlebia; Warren, 1896

= Zeuctophlebia =

Genus of moths

Zeuctophlebia is a genus of moths in the family Geometridae.

== Species ==
- Zeuctophlebia squalidata (Walker, 1863)
- Zeuctophlebia tapinodes Turner, 1904
