= Apotheta =

Scientific classification
- Kingdom: Animalia
- Phylum: Arthropoda
- Class: Insecta
- Order: Lepidoptera
- Family: Geometridae
- Subfamily: Oenochrominae
- Genus: Apotheta; Turner, 1931
- Species: A. tanymita

Binomial name
- Apotheta tanymita Turner, 1931

Monotypic genus of geometer moths

Apotheta is a monotypic moth genus in the family Geometridae. Its single species, Apotheta tanymita, is found in Australia. Both the genus and species were first described by Turner in 1931.
