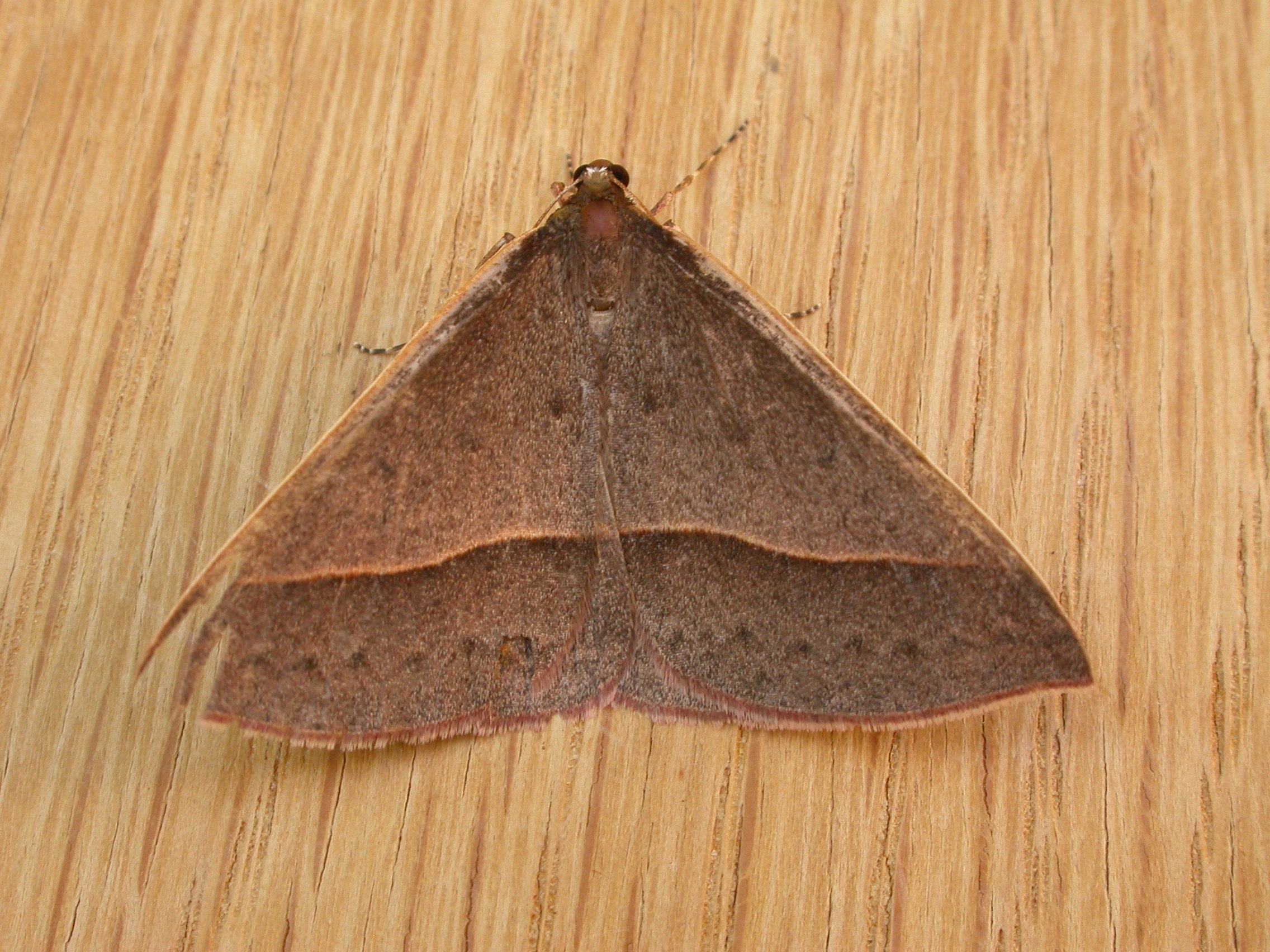

Scientific classification
- Domain: Eukaryota
- Kingdom: Animalia
- Phylum: Arthropoda
- Class: Insecta
- Order: Lepidoptera
- Family: Geometridae
- Genus: Epidesmia
- Species: E. chilonaria

Binomial name
- Epidesmia chilonaria Herrich-Schäffer, 1855

Synonyms
- Hemagalma aurina

= Epidesmia chilonaria =

Species of moth

Epidesmia chilonaria is a species of moth of the family Geometridae. It is found in the south-eastern quarter of Australia.

The larvae feed on Eucalyptus and Callistemon species.
