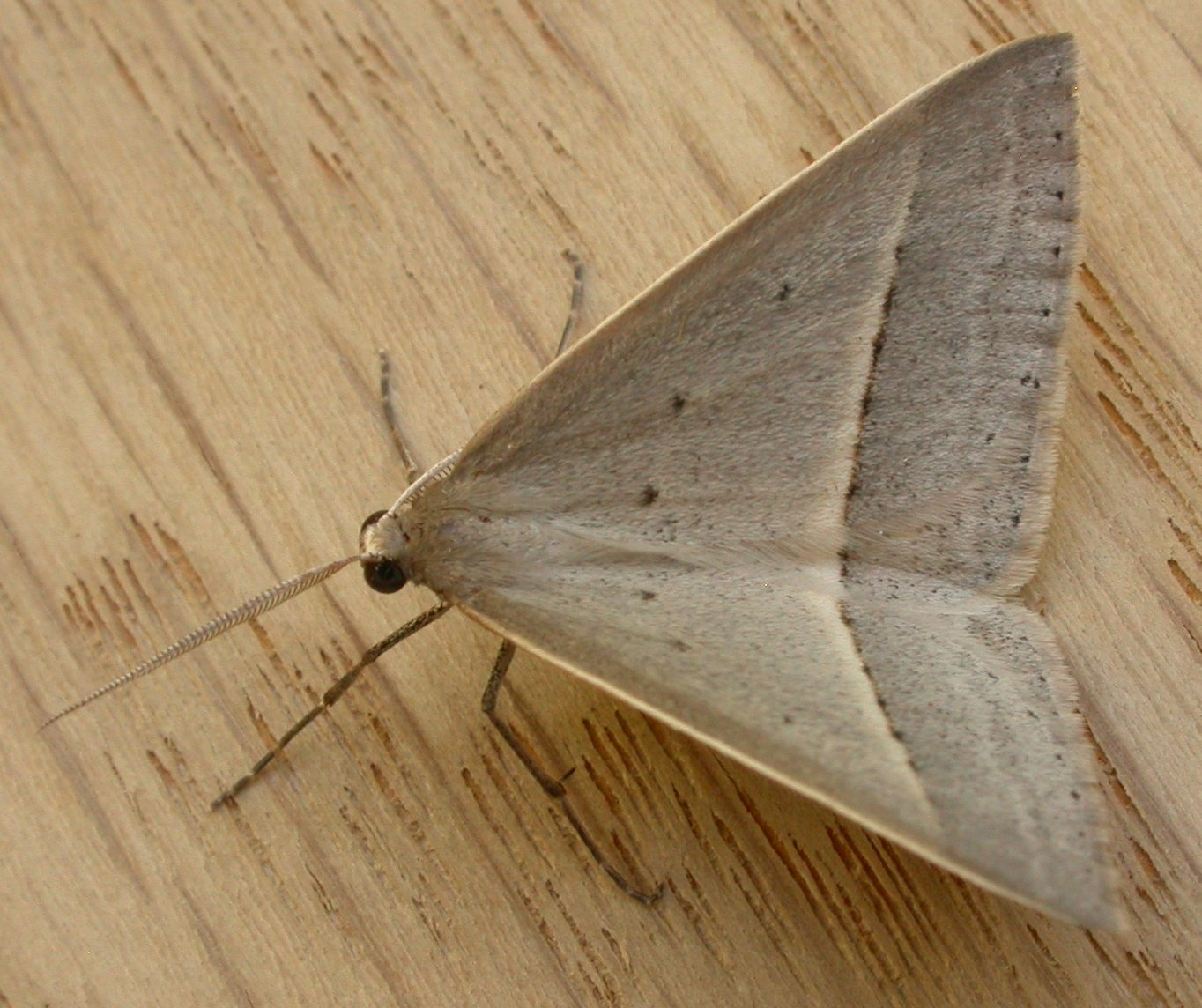

Scientific classification
- Kingdom: Animalia
- Phylum: Arthropoda
- Class: Insecta
- Order: Lepidoptera
- Family: Geometridae
- Genus: Epidesmia
- Species: E. perfabricata

Binomial name
- Epidesmia perfabricata Walker, 1861

Synonyms
- Panagra perfabricata

= Epidesmia perfabricata =

Species of moth

Epidesmia perfabricata is a moth of the family Geometridae. It is found in Australia.

The wingspan is about 35 mm.
