= Phthorarcha =

Scientific classification
- Kingdom: Animalia
- Phylum: Arthropoda
- Class: Insecta
- Order: Lepidoptera
- Family: Geometridae
- Subfamily: Oenochrominae
- Genus: Phthorarcha; Meyrick, 1892

Genus of moths

Phthorarcha is a genus of moths in the family Geometridae described by Edward Meyrick in 1892.

== Species ==
- Phthorarcha ishkovi Viidalepp, 1986
- Phthorarcha primigena Staudinger, 1895
