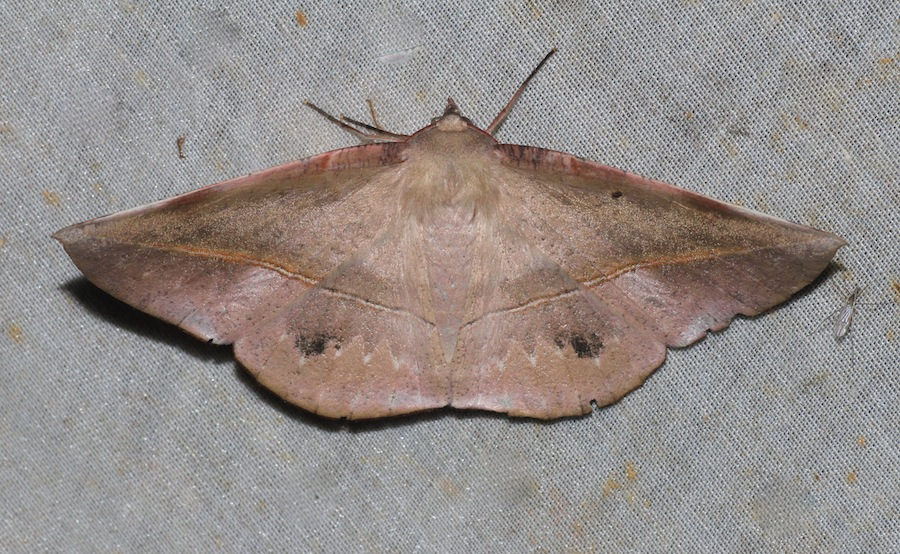
- Sarcinodes sumatraria from Borneo
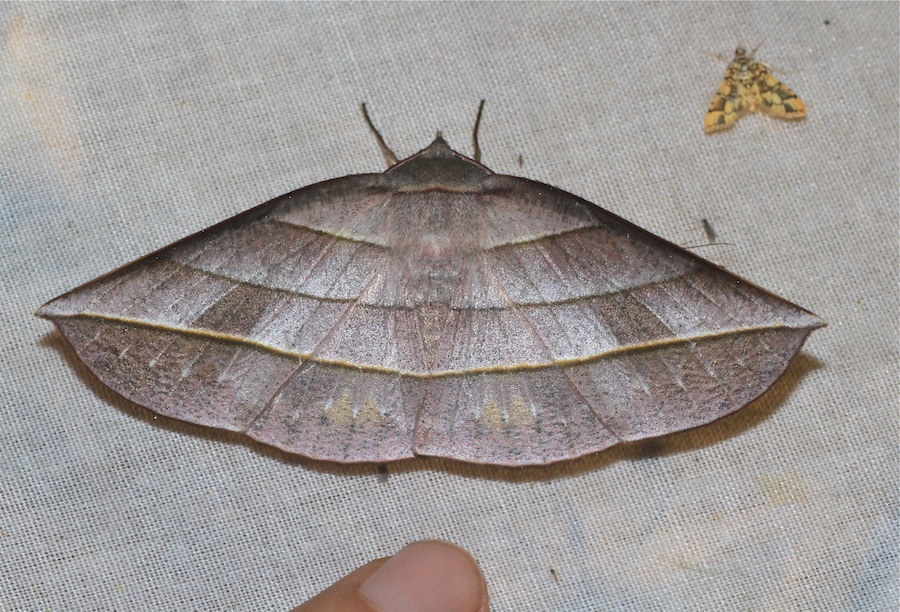
- Sarcinodes reductatus manfredi from Borneo

Scientific classification
- Kingdom: Animalia
- Phylum: Arthropoda
- Class: Insecta
- Order: Lepidoptera
- Family: Geometridae
- Subfamily: Oenochrominae
- Genus: Sarcinodes; Guenée, 1857

Type species
- Sarcinodes carnearia Guenée, 1857

Synonyms
- Auxima Walker, [1863]; Mergana Walker, 1860

= Sarcinodes =

Genus of moths

Sarcinodes is a genus of moths in the family Geometridae erected by Achille Guenée in 1857. The species are large with pinkish, mauvish or brownish-gray body and wings. The wings are traversed by between one and three oblique, straight fasciae. The forewing apex is acute, slightly falcate. The male antennae are unipectinate, those of the female are typically filiform, in some species unipectinate. The species are found in east Asia.

The small number of host plant records for Sarcinodes are Helicia (Proteaceae).

== Species ==
- Sarcinodes aegrota Butler, 1886
- Sarcinodes aequilinearia Walker, 1860
- Sarcinodes bilineata Moore, 1867
- Sarcinodes carnearia Guenée, 1857
- Sarcinodes compacta Warren, 1896
- Sarcinodes debitaria Walker, 1863
- Sarcinodes derufata Prout, 1921
- Sarcinodes flaviplaga Prout, 1913
- Sarcinodes holzi Pagenstecher, 1884
- Sarcinodes lilacina Moore, 1888
- Sarcinodes luzonensis Wileman & South, 1917
- Sarcinodes mongaku Marumo, 1921
- Sarcinodes olivata Warren, 1905
- Sarcinodes perakaria Swinhoe, 1899
- Sarcinodes punctata Warren, 1894
- Sarcinodes reductatus Inoue, 1992
- Sarcinodes restitutaria Walker, 1862
- Sarcinodes subfulvida Warren, 1896
- Sarcinodes subvirgata Prout, 1911
- Sarcinodes sumatraria Walker, 1866
- Sarcinodes susana Swinhoe, 1891
- Sarcinodes trilineata Walker, 1866
- Sarcinodes vultuaria Guenée, 1857
- Sarcinodes yaeyamana Inoue, 1976
- Sarcinodes yeni Sommerer, 1996
