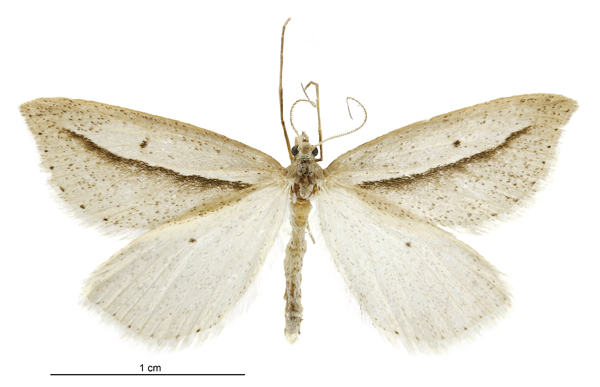
- Male

Conservation status
- Nationally Vulnerable (NZ TCS)

Scientific classification
- Kingdom: Animalia
- Phylum: Arthropoda
- Class: Insecta
- Order: Lepidoptera
- Family: Geometridae
- Subfamily: Oenochrominae
- Genus: Theoxena; Meyrick, 1883
- Species: T. scissaria

Binomial name
- Theoxena scissaria (Guenée, 1868)

Synonyms
- Panagra scissaria Guenée, 1868

= Theoxena scissaria =

Species of moth

Theoxena is a monotypic moth genus in the family Geometridae erected by Edward Meyrick in 1883. The only described species in this genus, Theoxena scissaria, was first described by Achille Guenée in 1868. This species is endemic to New Zealand and is now only found in the Makenzie Country and Central Otago regions of the South Island. There are two generations per year with the adult moths being observed on the wing most commonly in the months of May to July. As at 2024, only the male of this species has been observed with the female being unknown. It has been hypothesised that the female may be flightless. The species is said to have an affinity for Poa cita as well as for species in the genus Carmichaelia. Although T. scissaria has been collected during the day, it is also attracted to light. This species has been classified as nationally vulnerable by the Department of Conservation. It is likely locally extinct on the Canterbury Plains.

== Taxonomy ==
The genus Theoxena was described by Edward Meyrick in 1883. The species Theoxena scissaria was first described by Guenée in 1868 from a specimen obtained in Canterbury by Richard William Fereday and named Panagra scissaria. In 1883 Edward Meyrick placed the species into the newly created genus Theoxena. In 1898 and in 1928 George Vernon Hudson also described and illustrated Theoxena scissaria. The lectotype specimen, collected in Christchurch, is held at the Natural History Museum, London.

== Description ==
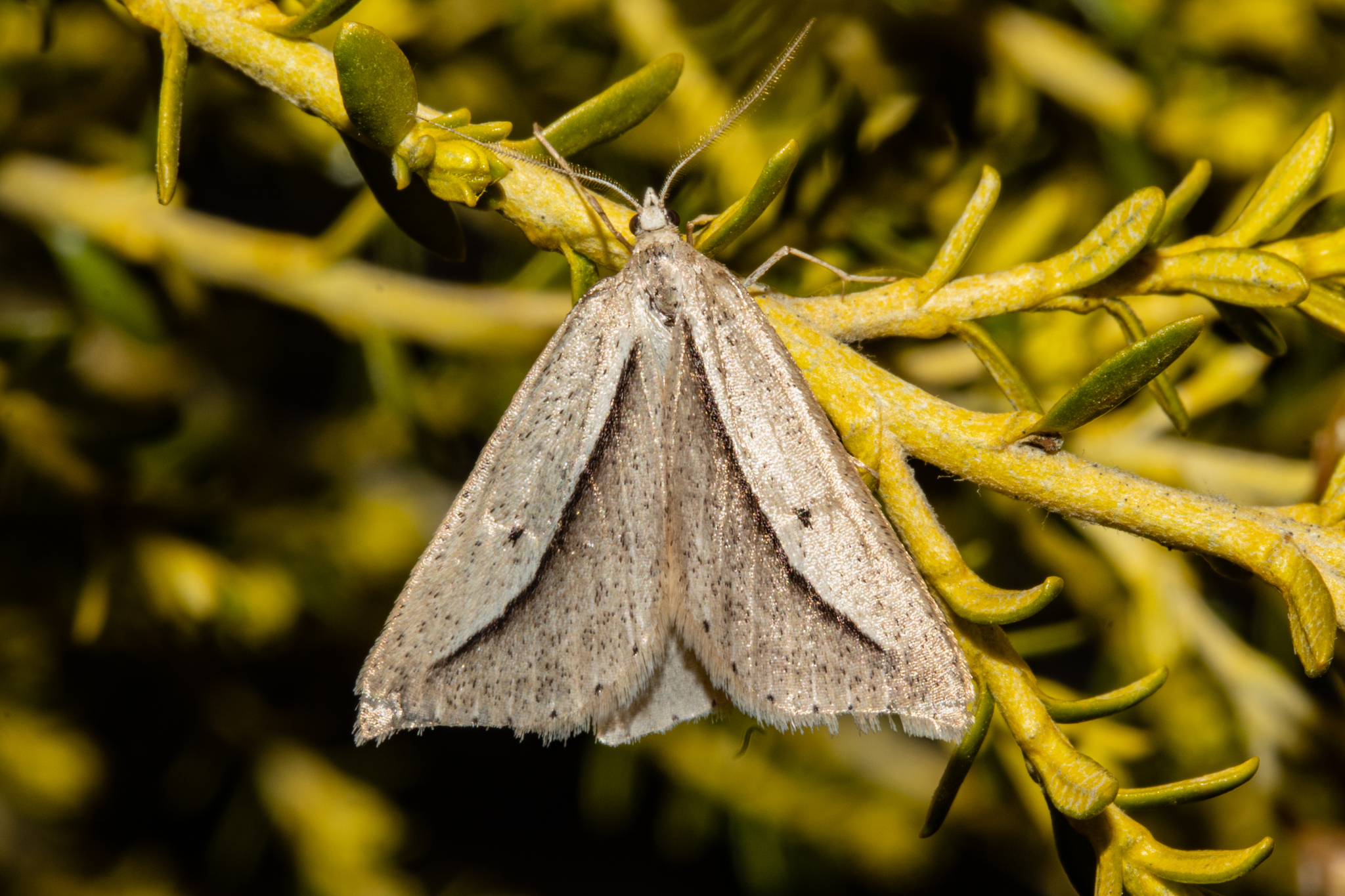
T. scissaria resting on Carmichaelia.

Meyrick described the species as follows:

Male. — 23-25 mm. Forewings narrow, hindmargin rather strongly sinuate; dull white, slightly sprinkled with dark fuscous; a curved dark fuscous median streak from inner margin near base almost to apex, sharply defined above, suffused beneath; a black dot in disc, and a row of dots on hindmargin. Hindwings elongate, narrow, apex broadly projecting; white; a blackish dot in disc, and a row on hindmargin.

As at 2024 the female of this species is unknown and it has been hypothesised that they are flightless.

== Distribution ==
This species is endemic to New Zealand. Its range is in North Canterbury, Mid Canterbury, South Canterbury, Mackenzie, Central Otago and Otago Lakes. Other than the type locality, specimens have been collected near the foot of Mount Hutt, the Winchmore Irrigation Research Station near Ashburton, at the lower slopes of Mount Ida in Otago, Horseshoe Slip on Mount Grey, and Ashley Gorge. It is now possibly extinct on the Canterbury Plains.

== Life cycle and behaviour ==
The life history of T. scissaria is still uncertain. Adults have been collected in late winter at the foot of Mount Ida, though none were collected there after August. This species has also been recorded as being on the wing in June, December and January. It is most commonly seen between the months of May and July. A second generation emerges during the summer months. Although T. scissaria has been collected during the day, it is attracted to light.

== Habitat ==
This species frequents plains.

== Host species ==
The host species of T. scissaria is as yet unknown. However, this species has been associated with the tussock grass species Poa cita. It has been hypothesised that the host species for T. scissaria larvae may be species in the genus Carmichaelia.

== Conservation status ==
This moth is classified under the New Zealand Threat Classification system as being nationally vulnerable.
