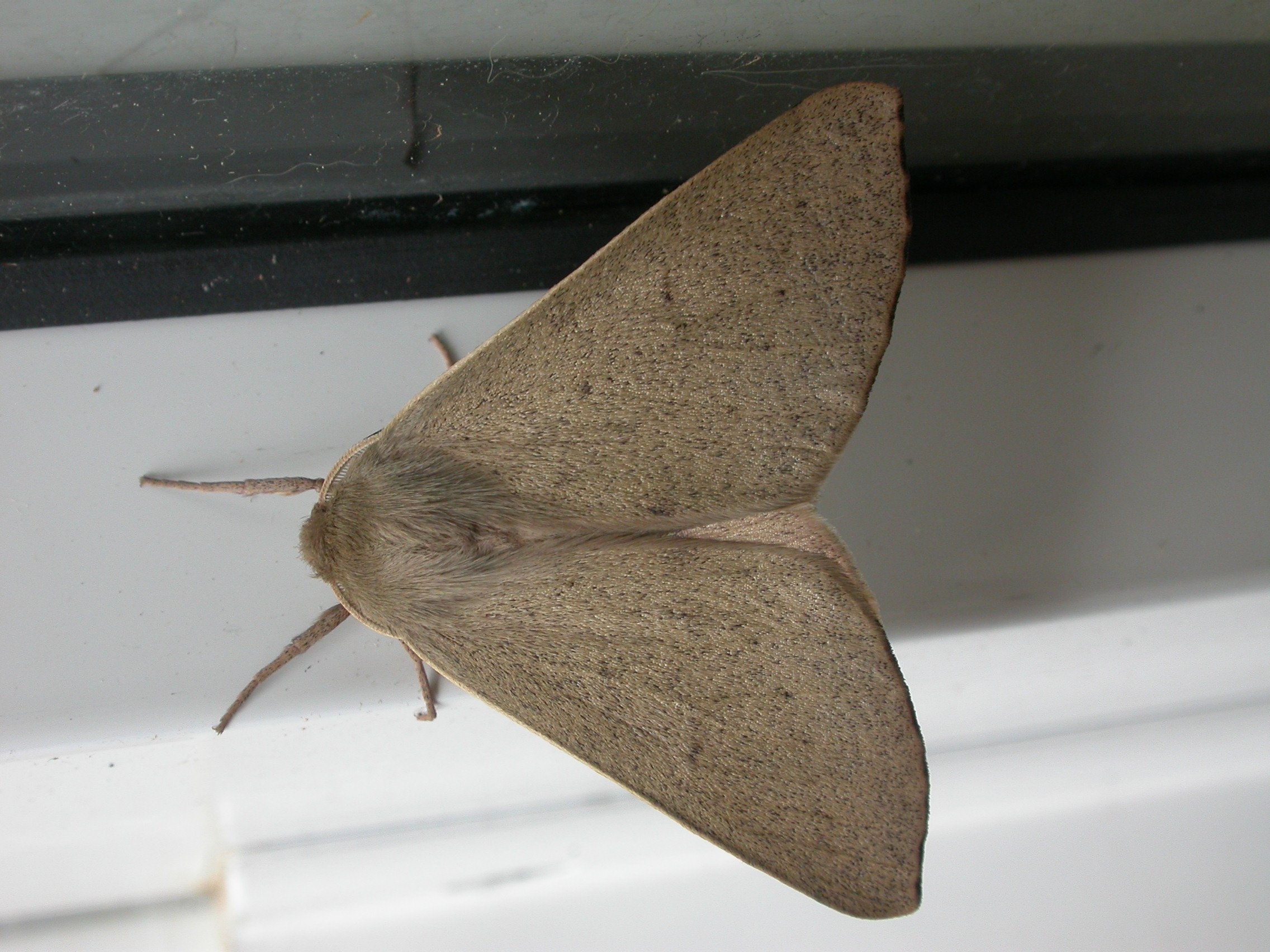

Scientific classification
- Kingdom: Animalia
- Phylum: Arthropoda
- Clade: Pancrustacea
- Class: Insecta
- Order: Lepidoptera
- Family: Geometridae
- Subfamily: Oenochrominae
- Genus: Arhodia; Guenée, 1857
- Species: A. lasiocamparia

Binomial name
- Arhodia lasiocamparia Guenée, 1857

Synonyms
- Generic: Nigasa Walker, 1855; Arrhodia Meyrick, 1890; Specific: Arhodia retractaria Walker, 1860; Nigasa subpurpurea Walker, 1860; Arhodia semirosea Walker, 1862; Descoreba rosalinda Thierry-Mieg, 1892; Monoctenia ozora C. Swinhoe, 1902; carnea Warren, 1905

= Arhodia =

Genus of moths

Arhodia is a monotypic genus of moth in the family Geometridae. Its only species, Arhodia lasiocamparia, the pink arhodia, is found in mainland Australia and Tasmania. Both the genus and species were first described by Achille Guenée in 1857.

The wingspan is about 60 mm for males and 70 mm for females. The moth flies from October to January.

The larvae feed on Eucalyptus species.
