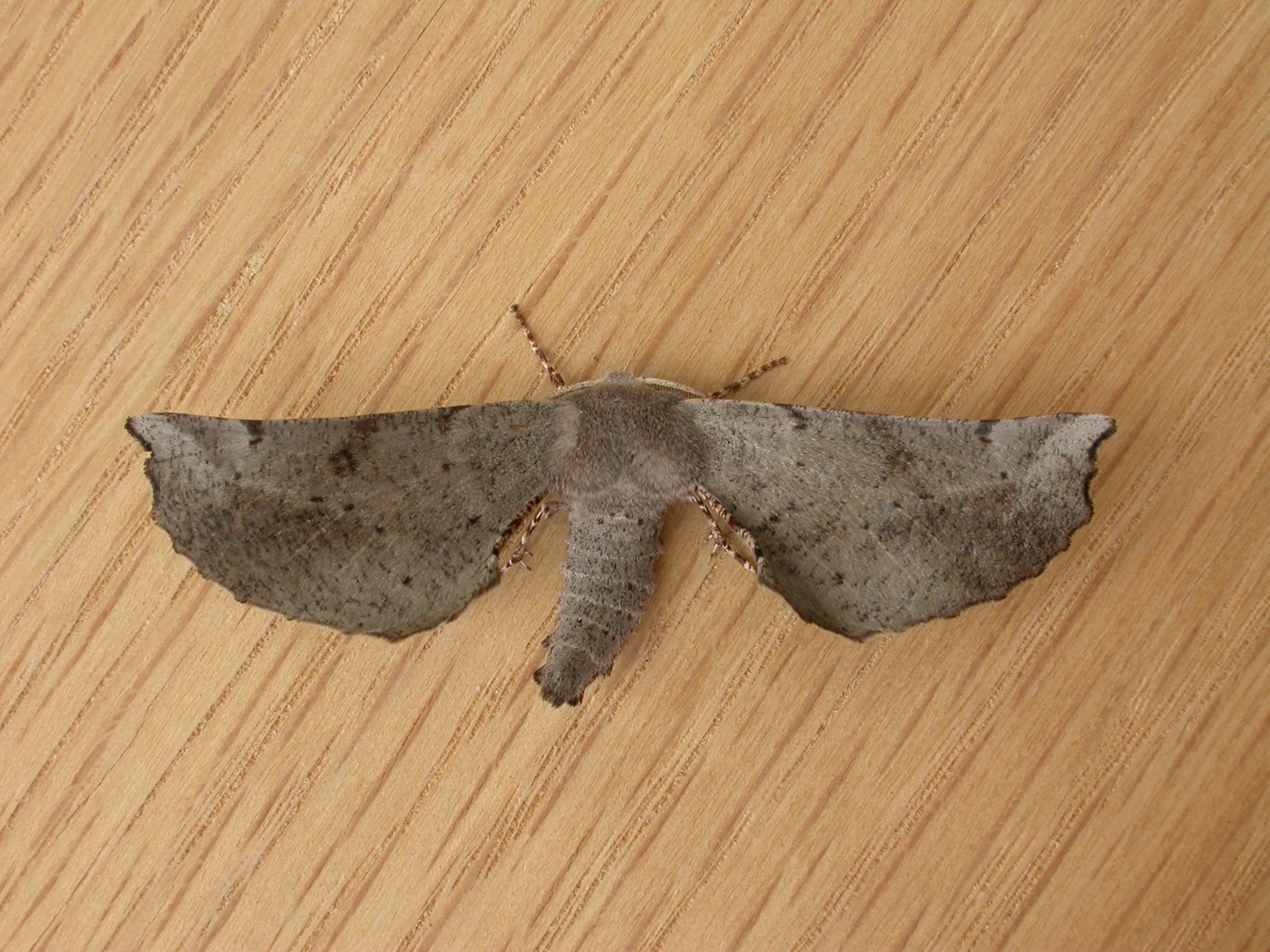
- Circopetes obtusata

Scientific classification
- Kingdom: Animalia
- Phylum: Arthropoda
- Clade: Pancrustacea
- Class: Insecta
- Order: Lepidoptera
- Family: Geometridae
- Subfamily: Oenochrominae
- Genus: Circopetes; Prout, 1910
- Species: C. obtusata

Binomial name
- Circopetes obtusata Walker, 1860

Synonyms
- Monoctenia obtusata Walker, 1860; Monoctenia himeroides Walker, 1860; Arhodia modesta Warren, 1904

= Circopetes =

Genus of moths

Circopetes is a monotypic moth genus in the family Geometridae erected by Louis Beethoven Prout in 1910. Its only species, Circopetes obtusata, the grey twisted moth, was first described by Francis Walker in 1860. It is found in mainland Australia.

The wingspan is about 60 mm.

The larvae feed on Eucalyptus nicholii.
