= Adesmobathra =

Scientific classification
- Kingdom: Animalia
- Phylum: Arthropoda
- Class: Insecta
- Order: Lepidoptera
- Family: Geometridae
- Subfamily: Oenochrominae
- Genus: Adesmobathra; Prout, 1916
- Species: A. ozoloides

Binomial name
- Adesmobathra ozoloides Prout, 1916

Monotypic genus of geometer moths

Adesmobathra is a monotypic moth genus in the family Geometridae. Its only species, Adesmobathra ozoloides, is found in Tanzania. Both the genus and species were first described by Prout in 1916.
