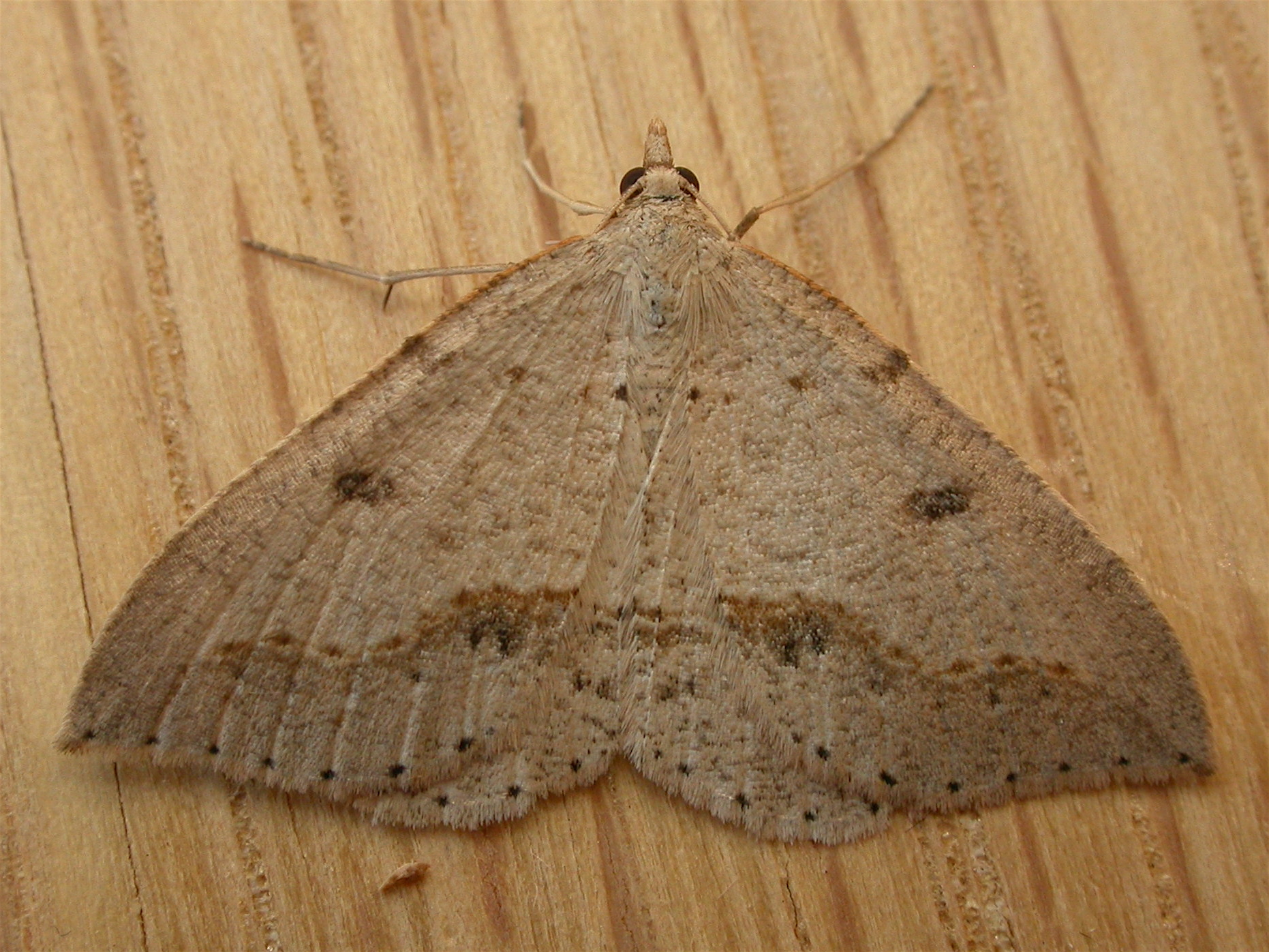

Scientific classification
- Kingdom: Animalia
- Phylum: Arthropoda
- Class: Insecta
- Order: Lepidoptera
- Family: Geometridae
- Genus: Taxeotis
- Species: T. stereospila

Binomial name
- Taxeotis stereospila Meyrick, 1890

= Taxeotis stereospila =

Species of moth

Taxeotis stereospila, the oval-spot taxeotis, is a moth of the family Geometridae. The species was first described by Edward Meyrick in 1890 and it is found in Australia.
