= Cortixa =

Scientific classification
- Kingdom: Animalia
- Phylum: Arthropoda
- Class: Insecta
- Order: Lepidoptera
- Family: Geometridae
- Subfamily: Oenochrominae
- Genus: Cortixa; Schaus, 1901
- Species: C. aurudaria

Binomial name
- Cortixa aurudaria Schaus, 1901

Genus of moths

Cortixa is a monotypic moth genus in the family Geometridae. Its only species, Cortixa aurudaria, is found in Peru. Both the genus and species were first described by William Schaus in 1901.
