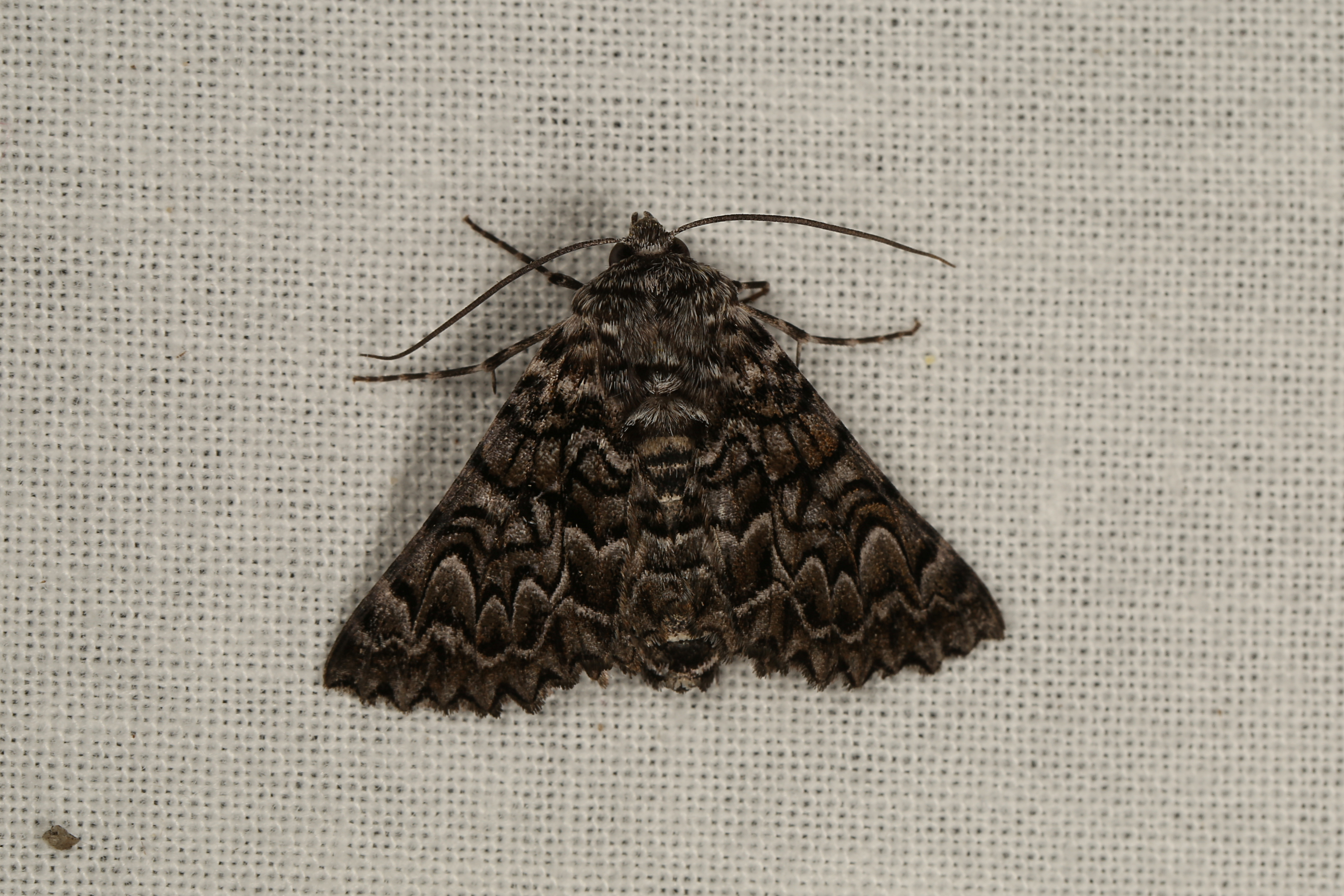

Scientific classification
- Kingdom: Animalia
- Phylum: Arthropoda
- Clade: Pancrustacea
- Class: Insecta
- Order: Lepidoptera
- Family: Geometridae
- Subfamily: Oenochrominae
- Genus: Dinophalus; Prout, 1910

Synonyms
- Ophiographa Prout, 1910; Lissocraspeda Prout, 1910; Bumetopon Aurivillius, 1920

= Dinophalus =

Genus of moths

Dinophalus is a genus of moths in the family Geometridae.

== Species ==
- Dinophalus ampycteria (Turner, 1930)
- Dinophalus atmoscia (Meyrick, 1890)
- Dinophalus bathrosema (Prout, 1911)
- Dinophalus bicorne (Aurivillius, 1920)
- Dinophalus cyanorrhoea (Lower, 1903)
- Dinophalus drakei (Prout, 1910)
- Dinophalus eremoea (Lower, 1907)
- Dinophalus hiracopis (Meyrick, 1890)
- Dinophalus idiocrana Turner, 1930
- Dinophalus incongrua (Walker, 1857)
- Dinophalus lechriomita Turner, 1930
- Dinophalus macrophyes (Prout, 1910)
- Dinophalus oxystoma (Turner, 1939)
- Dinophalus serpentaria (Guenée, 1864)
- Dinophalus thrasyschema (Turner, 1939)
