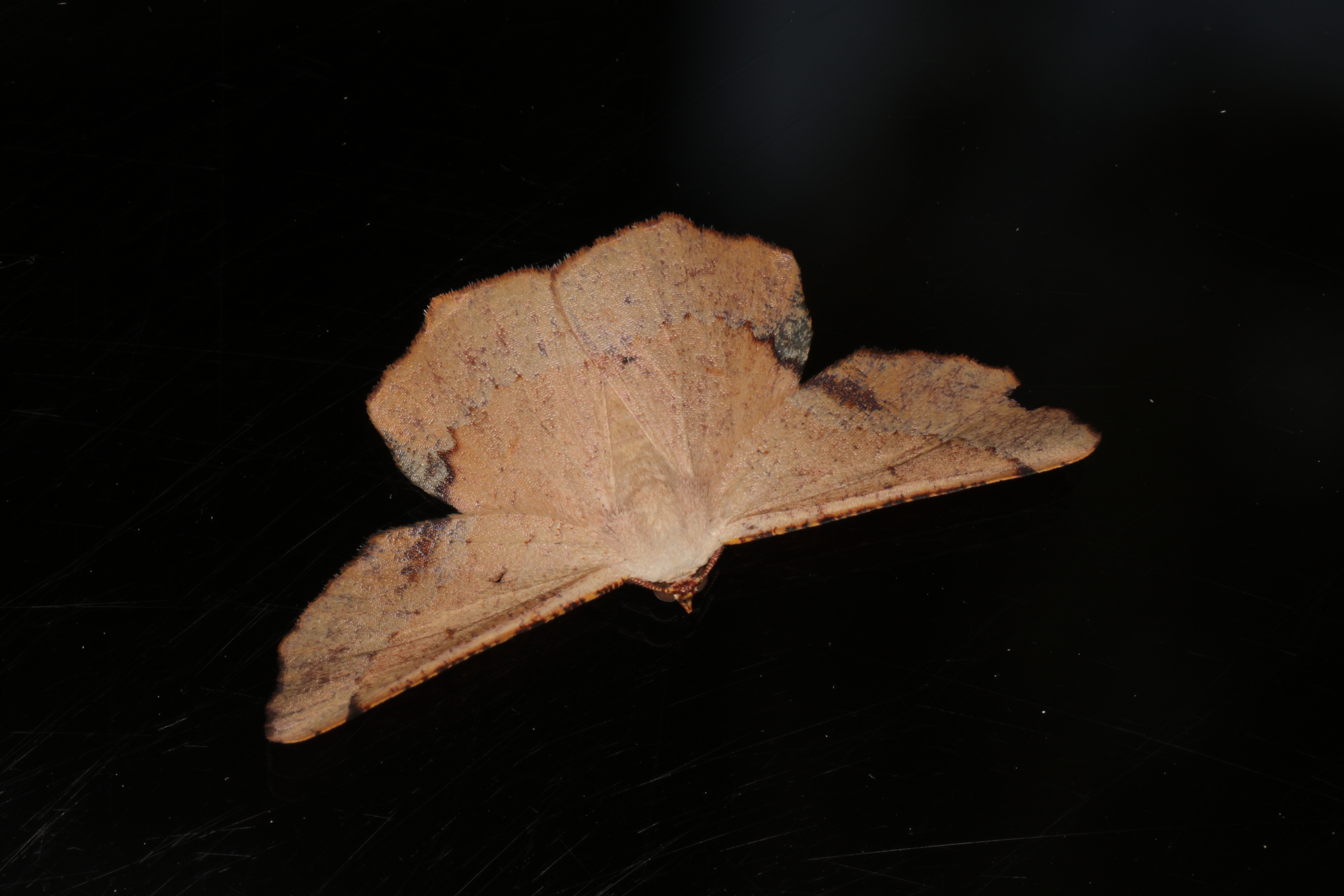
- Cernia amyclaria

Scientific classification
- Kingdom: Animalia
- Phylum: Arthropoda
- Clade: Pancrustacea
- Class: Insecta
- Order: Lepidoptera
- Family: Geometridae
- Subfamily: Oenochrominae
- Genus: Cernia; Walker, 1860
- Species: C. amyclaria

Binomial name
- Cernia amyclaria Walker, 1860

Synonyms
- Generic: Aspidoptera Lucas, 1900; Tetraspidoptera Speiser, 1902; Specific: Pseudoterpna diphtherina Meyrick, 1889; Monoctenia odontias Lower, 1894; Aspidoptera ambiens Lucas, 1900

= Cernia =

Genus of moths

Cernia is a monotypic genus of moths in the family Geometridae. Its only species, Cernia amyclaria, is found in Australia. Both the genus and species were described by Francis Walker in 1860.
