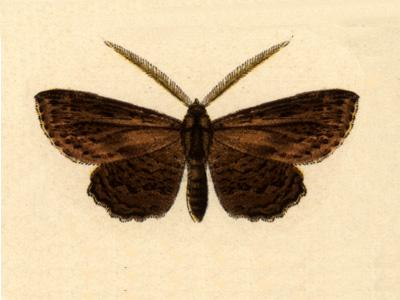
- Ergavia subrufa

Scientific classification
- Kingdom: Animalia
- Phylum: Arthropoda
- Class: Insecta
- Order: Lepidoptera
- Family: Geometridae
- Subfamily: Oenochrominae
- Genus: Ergavia; Walker, 1866

= Ergavia =

Genus of moths

Ergavia is a genus of moths in the family Geometridae. The genus was erected by Francis Walker in 1866.

== Species ==
- Ergavia benesignata (Dognin, 1906)
- Ergavia borrowsi Prout, 1917
- Ergavia brunnea (Schaus, 1901)
- Ergavia carinenta (Cramer, 1777)
- Ergavia costimaculata Prout, 1913
- Ergavia divecta (Warren, 1908)
- Ergavia drucei Schaus, 1901
- Ergavia endoeasta Prout, 1917
- Ergavia eris Prout, 1916
- Ergavia exstantilinea Prout, 1932
- Ergavia illineata (Warren, 1908)
- Ergavia leopoldina Prout, 1932
- Ergavia liraria (Guenee, 1858)
- Ergavia merops (Cramer, 1775)
- Ergavia obliterata Schaus, 1901
- Ergavia oenobapta Prout, 1934
- Ergavia piercei Prout, 1917
- Ergavia roseivena Prout, 1910
- Ergavia stigmaria (Walker, 1860)
- Ergavia subrufa (Warren, 1897)
- Ergavia venturii Prout, 1917
