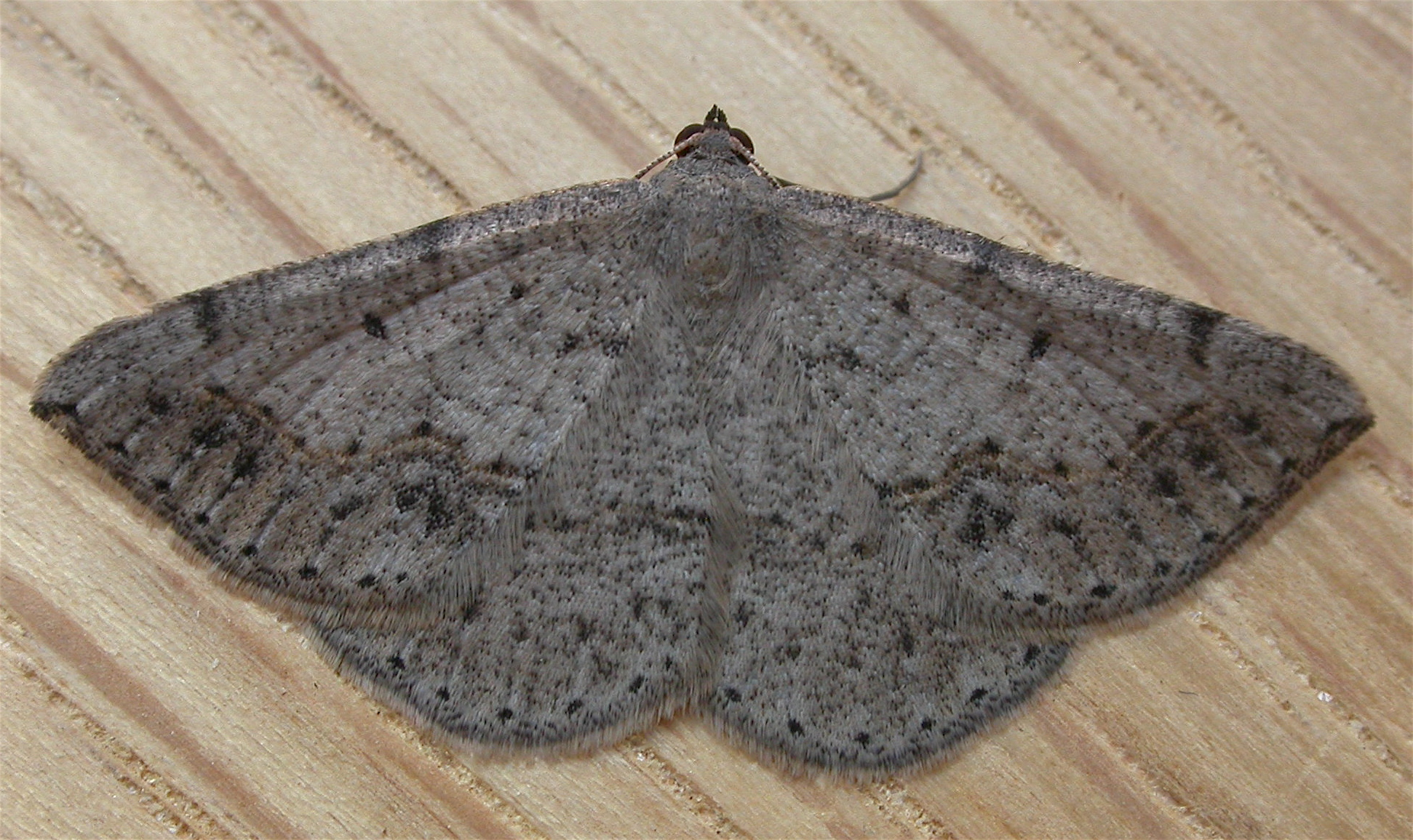

Scientific classification
- Kingdom: Animalia
- Phylum: Arthropoda
- Class: Insecta
- Order: Lepidoptera
- Family: Geometridae
- Genus: Taxeotis
- Species: T. intextata

Binomial name
- Taxeotis intextata Guenée, 1857

= Taxeotis intextata =

Species of moth

Taxeotis intextata is a species of moth of the family Geometridae. It is widely distributed in Australia, from Duaringa, Queensland, to Victoria and Tasmania.
