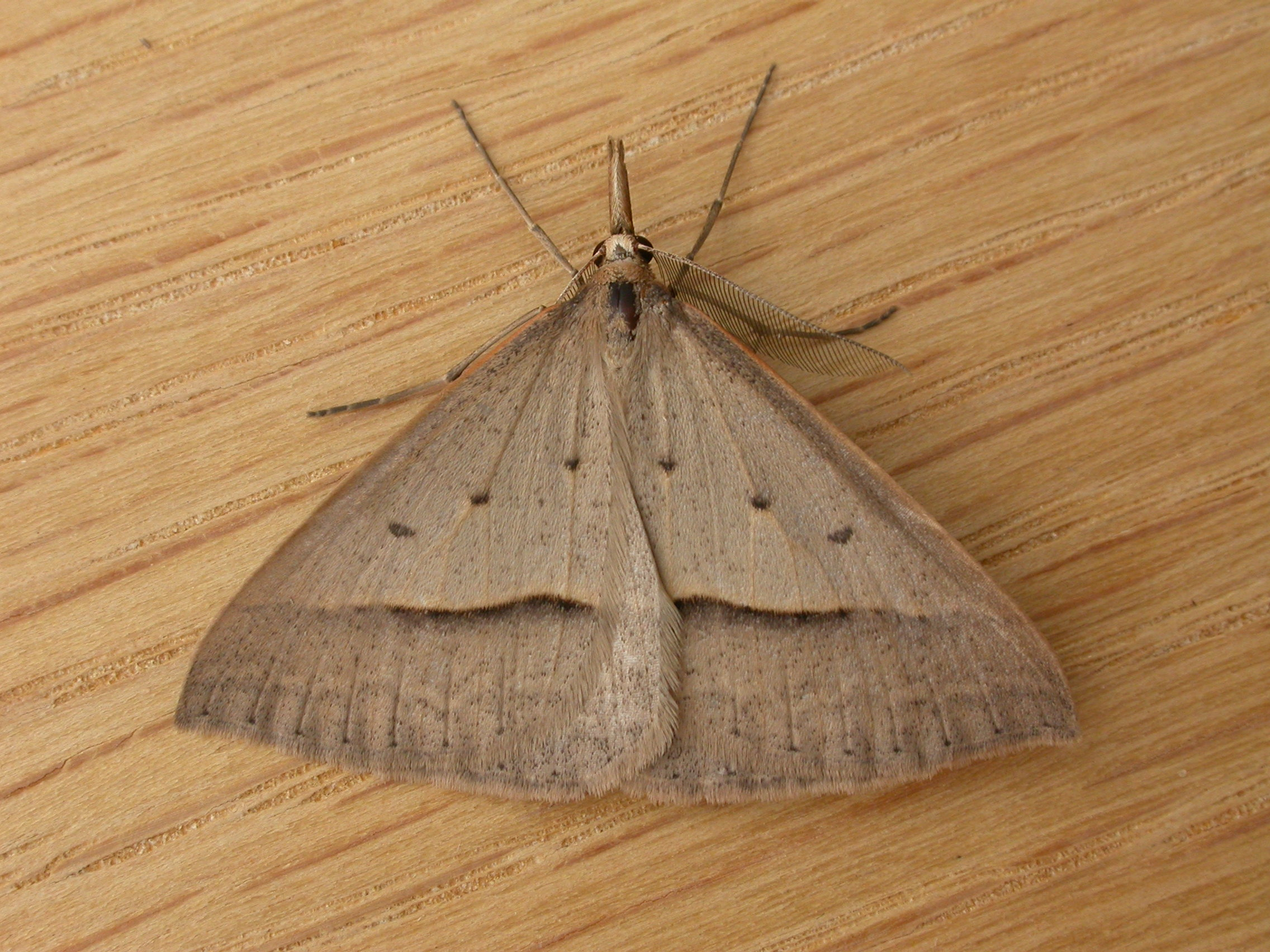
- Epidesmia hypenaria

Scientific classification
- Kingdom: Animalia
- Phylum: Arthropoda
- Class: Insecta
- Order: Lepidoptera
- Family: Geometridae
- Subfamily: Oenochrominae
- Genus: Epidesmia; Duncan [& Westwood], 1841

= Epidesmia =

Genus of moths

Epidesmia is a genus of moths in the family Geometridae erected by Duncan and Westwood in 1841.

== Species ==
- Epidesmia brachygrammella Lower, 1893
- Epidesmia chilonaria (Herrich-Schäffer, [1855])
- Epidesmia hypenaria (Guenée, 1857)
- Epidesmia oxyderces Meyrick, 1890
- Epidesmia perfabricata (Walker, 1861)
- Epidesmia phoenicina Turner, 1929
- Epidesmia reservata (Walker, 1861)
- Epidesmia tricolor Duncan [& Westood], 1841
- Epidesmia tryxaria (Guenée, 1857)
