= Entogonia =

Scientific classification
- Kingdom: Animalia
- Phylum: Arthropoda
- Class: Insecta
- Order: Lepidoptera
- Family: Geometridae
- Subfamily: Oenochrominae
- Genus: Entogonia; Warren, 1904

Genus of moths

Entogonia is a genus of moths in the family Geometridae described by Warren in 1904.
