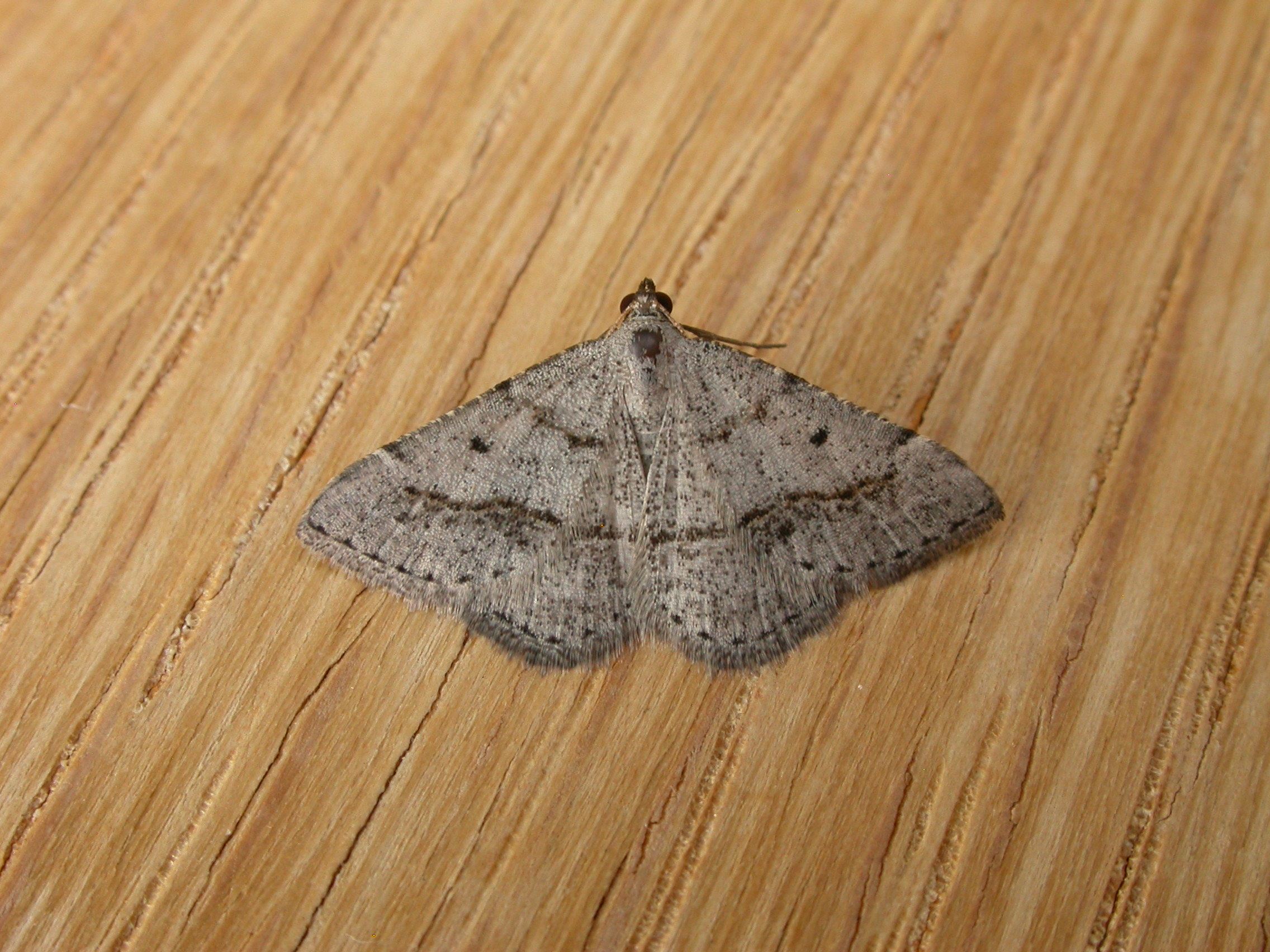

Scientific classification
- Kingdom: Animalia
- Phylum: Arthropoda
- Class: Insecta
- Order: Lepidoptera
- Family: Geometridae
- Genus: Taxeotis
- Species: T. exsectaria

Binomial name
- Taxeotis exsectaria Walker, 1861

= Taxeotis exsectaria =

Species of moth

Taxeotis exsectaria is a species of moth of the family Geometridae. It is found in Australia.
