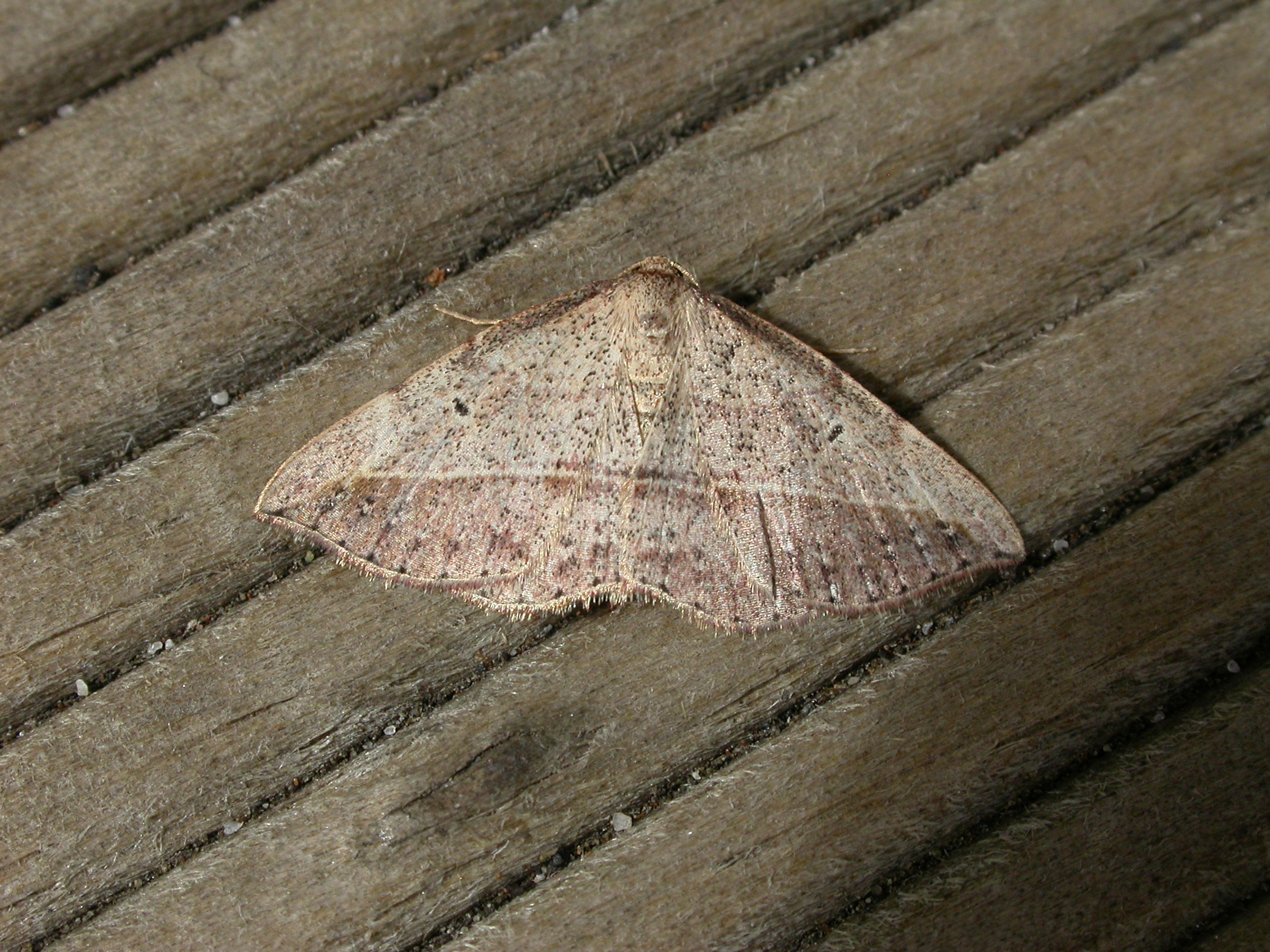

Scientific classification
- Kingdom: Animalia
- Phylum: Arthropoda
- Class: Insecta
- Order: Lepidoptera
- Family: Geometridae
- Genus: Zeuctophlebia
- Species: Z. squalidata

Binomial name
- Zeuctophlebia squalidata (Walker, 1863)

Synonyms
- Fidonia squalidata Walker, 1863; Zeuctophlebia rufipalpis Warren, 1896

= Zeuctophlebia squalidata =

Species of moth

Zeuctophlebia squalidata is a species of moth of the family Geometridae first described by Francis Walker in 1863. It is found in Australia.
