= Ecphyas =

Scientific classification
- Kingdom: Animalia
- Phylum: Arthropoda
- Class: Insecta
- Order: Lepidoptera
- Family: Geometridae
- Subfamily: Oenochrominae
- Genus: Ecphyas; Turner, 1929
- Species: E. holopsara

Binomial name
- Ecphyas holopsara Turner, 1929

Genus of moths

Ecphyas is a monotypic moth genus in the family Geometridae. Its only species, Ecphyas holopsara, is found in Australia. Both the genus and species were first described by Turner in 1929.
