= Barrama =

Scientific classification
- Kingdom: Animalia
- Phylum: Arthropoda
- Class: Insecta
- Order: Lepidoptera
- Family: Geometridae
- Subfamily: Oenochrominae
- Genus: Barrama

Type species
- Barrama impunctata Warren, 1897

Genus of insects

Barrama is a genus of moths in the family Geometridae. It contains only the Barrama impunctata species.
