= Myinodes =

Scientific classification
- Domain: Eukaryota
- Kingdom: Animalia
- Phylum: Arthropoda
- Class: Insecta
- Order: Lepidoptera
- Family: Geometridae
- Subfamily: Oenochrominae
- Genus: Myinodes; Meyrick, 1892

Genus of moths

Myinodes is a genus of moths in the family Geometridae described by Edward Meyrick in 1892.

== Species ==
- Myinodes interpunctaria (Herrich-Schäffer, 1839) north-eastern Algeria, Tunisia, southern Italy
- Myinodes constantina Hausmann, 1994 northern Africa
- Myinodes shohami Hausmann, 1994 Turkey, Syria, Lebanon, Israel, Jordan, northern Iraq, western Iran, Libya, Algeria
