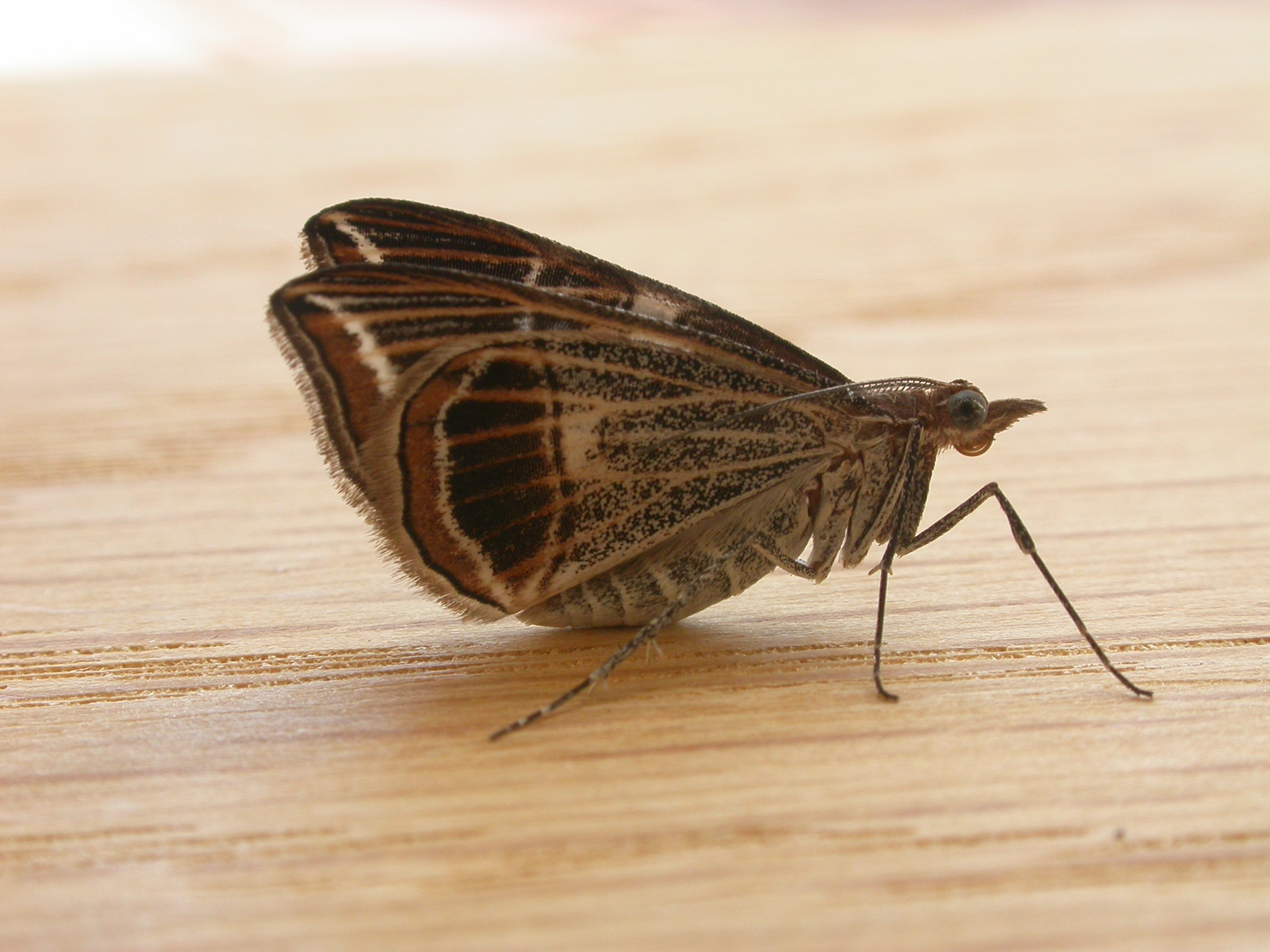

Scientific classification
- Kingdom: Animalia
- Phylum: Arthropoda
- Class: Insecta
- Order: Lepidoptera
- Family: Geometridae
- Genus: Phrataria
- Species: P. transcissata

Binomial name
- Phrataria transcissata Walker, 1863

= Phrataria transcissata =

Species of moth

Phrataria transcissata is a moth of the family Geometridae first described by Francis Walker in 1863. It is found in Australia.

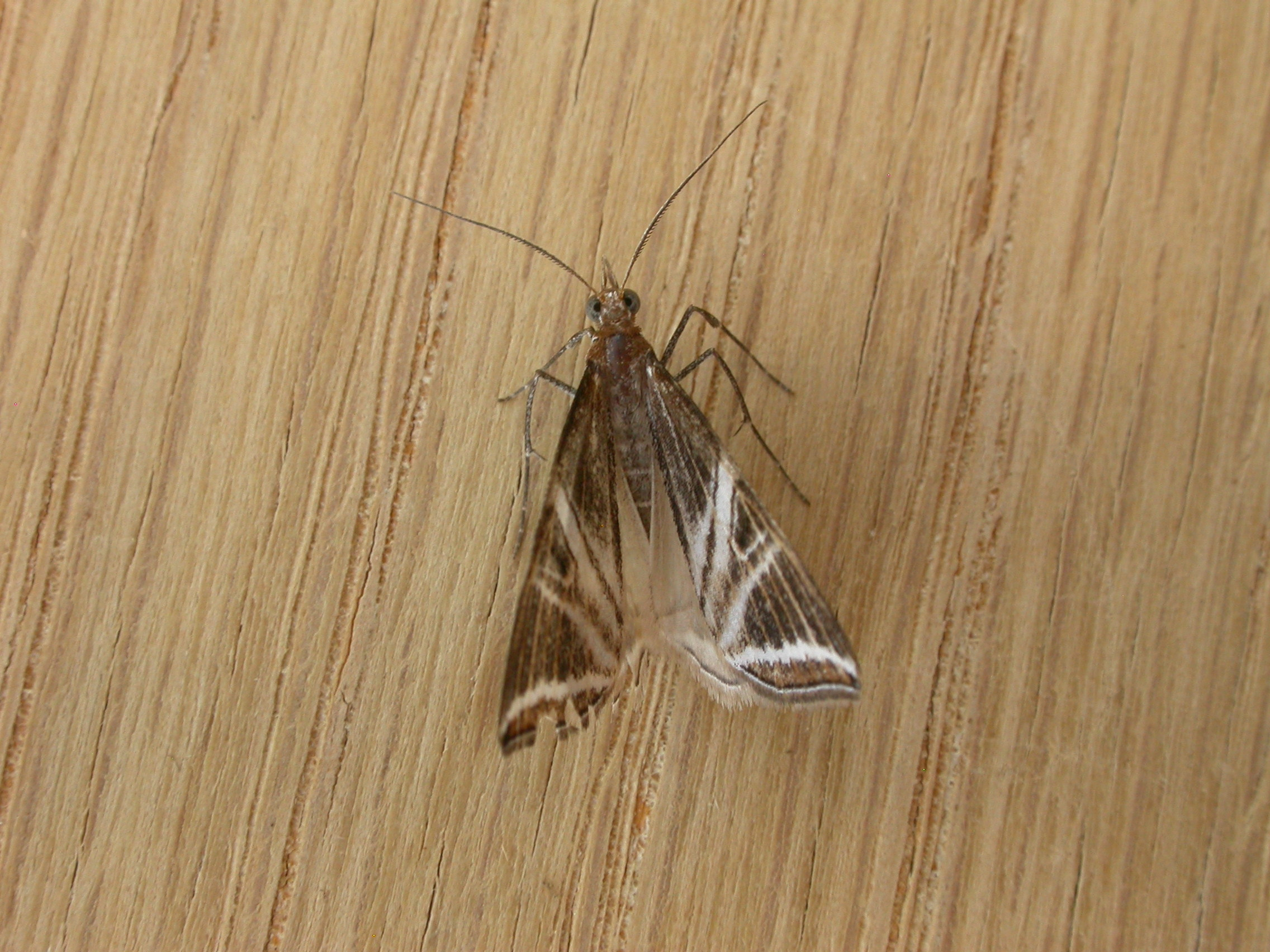

The wingspan is about 20 mm.
