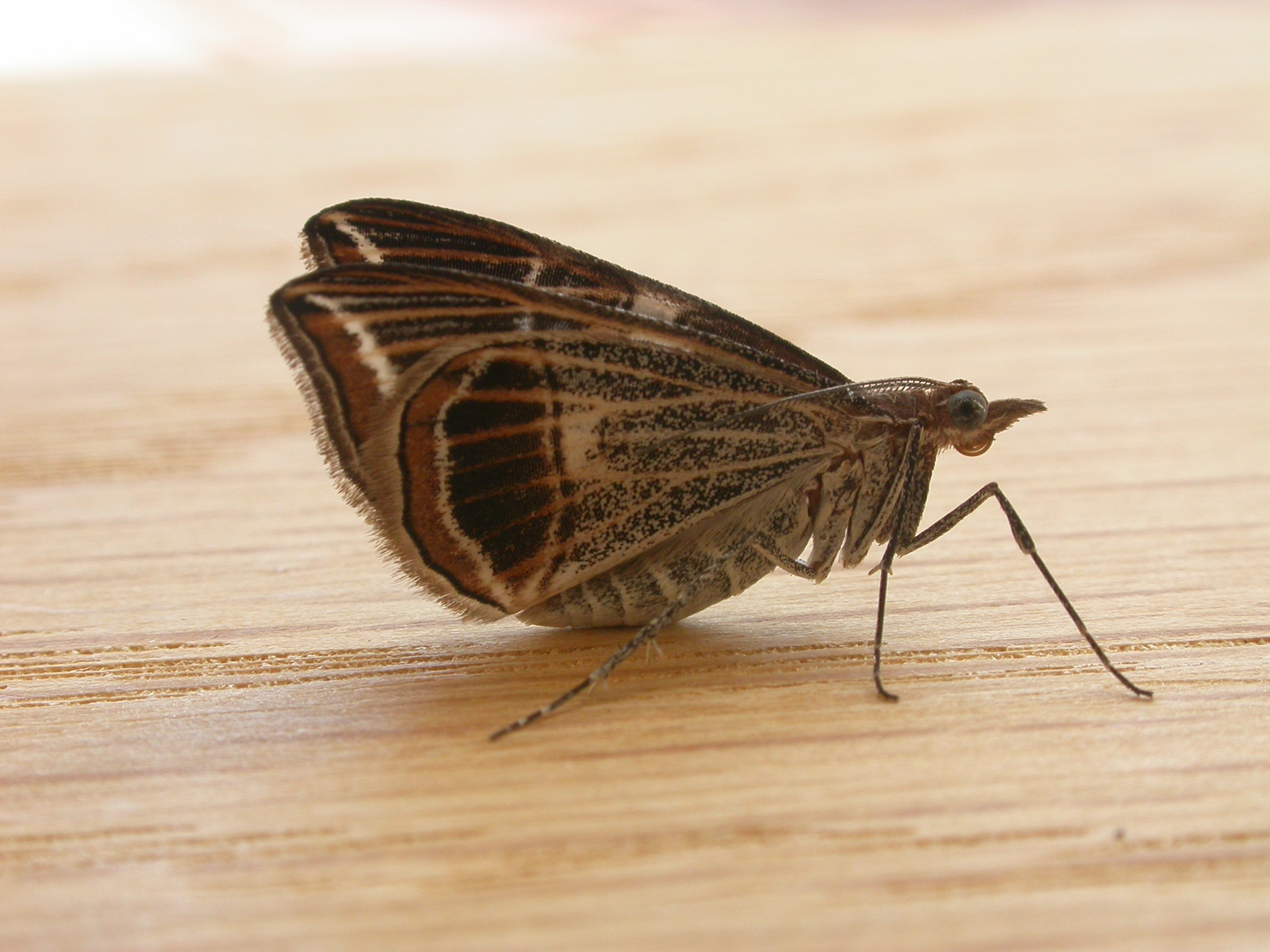
- Phrataria transcissata

Scientific classification
- Kingdom: Animalia
- Phylum: Arthropoda
- Class: Insecta
- Order: Lepidoptera
- Family: Geometridae
- Subfamily: Oenochrominae
- Genus: Phrataria; Walker, [1863]

= Phrataria =

Genus of moths

Phrataria is a genus of moths in the family Geometridae erected by Francis Walker in 1863. All the species in this genus are known from Australia.

== Species ==
- Phrataria bijugata (Walker, [1863])
- Phrataria transcissata Walker, [1863]
- Phrataria replicataria Walker, 1866
- Phrataria v-album Turner, 1944
