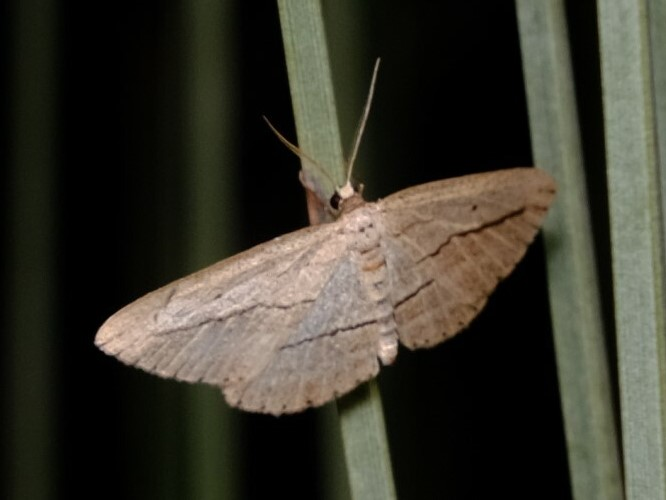
- Cathaemacta loxomochla

Scientific classification
- Domain: Eukaryota
- Kingdom: Animalia
- Phylum: Arthropoda
- Class: Insecta
- Order: Lepidoptera
- Family: Geometridae
- Subfamily: Oenochrominae
- Genus: Cathaemacta; Turner, 1929

= Cathaemacta =

Genus of moths

Cathaemacta is a genus of moths in the family Geometridae.

== Species ==
- Cathaemacta loxomochla Turner, 1929
- Cathaemacta thermistis (Lower, 1894)
