= Symphylistis =

Scientific classification
- Kingdom: Animalia
- Phylum: Arthropoda
- Clade: Pancrustacea
- Class: Insecta
- Order: Lepidoptera
- Family: Geometridae
- Subfamily: Oenochrominae
- Genus: Symphylistis; Turner, 1930
- Species: S. leptocyma

Binomial name
- Symphylistis leptocyma Turner, 1930

Genus of moths

Symphylistis is a genus of moths in the family Geometridae from Australia. Symphylistis leptocyma is the only species in the monotypic genus Symphylistis. It was first described by Turner, 1930 (p.26).

== Description ==
Symphylistis leptocyma is endemic to Australia.

== Species ==
These species belong to the genus Symphylistis:

- Symphylistis leptocyma Turner, 1930 – Australia
