= Arcina =

Scientific classification
- Kingdom: Animalia
- Phylum: Arthropoda
- Class: Insecta
- Order: Lepidoptera
- Family: Geometridae
- Subfamily: Oenochrominae
- Genus: Arcina; Walker, [1863]
- Species: A. fulgorigera

Binomial name
- Arcina fulgorigera Walker, [1863]

Synonyms
- Generic: Prorocrania Turner, 1904; Specific: Prorocrania argyritis Turner, 1904

Genus of moths

Arcina is a monotypic moth genus in the family Geometridae. Its only species, Arcina fulgorigera, is found in Australia. Both the genus and species were first described by Francis Walker in 1863.
