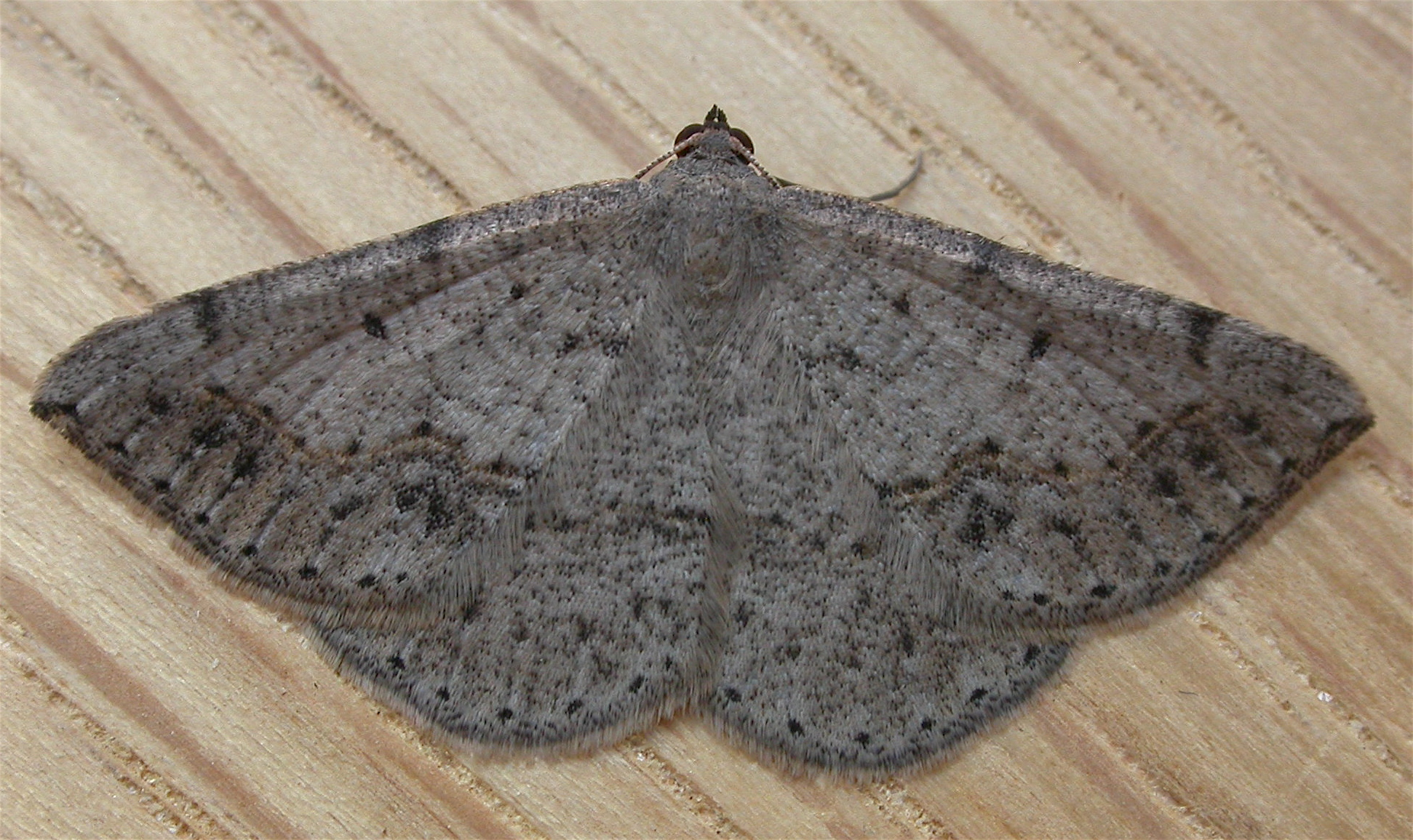
- Taxeotis intextata

Scientific classification
- Domain: Eukaryota
- Kingdom: Animalia
- Phylum: Arthropoda
- Class: Insecta
- Order: Lepidoptera
- Family: Geometridae
- Subfamily: Oenochrominae
- Genus: Taxeotis; Guest, 1887

= Taxeotis =

Genus of moths

Taxeotis is a genus of moths in the family Geometridae described by Edward Guest in 1887. All the species in this genus are found in Australia.

== Species ==
- Taxeotis acrothecta Turner, 1904
- Taxeotis adelia Prout, 1910
- Taxeotis adelpha Turner, 1904
- Taxeotis aenigmatodes Turner, 1929
- Taxeotis alloceros Turner, 1929
- Taxeotis anthracopa Meyrick, 1890
- Taxeotis bigeminata L. B. Prout, 1910
- Taxeotis blechra Turner, 1929
- Taxeotis celidora Turner, 1939
- Taxeotis compar Turner, 1929
- Taxeotis didymosticha Turner, 1939
- Taxeotis egenata (Walker, 1861)
- Taxeotis endela Meyrick, 1890
- Taxeotis epigaea Turner, 1904
- Taxeotis epigypsa Meyrick, 1890
- Taxeotis eremophila Turner, 1929
- Taxeotis euryzona Turner, 1936
- Taxeotis eutyctodes Turner, 1939
- Taxeotis exaereta Turner, 1929
- Taxeotis exsectaria (Walker, 1861)
- Taxeotis goniogramma Meyrick, 1897
- Taxeotis helicta Turner, 1939
- Taxeotis holoscia Lower, 1903
- Taxeotis homoeopa Turner, 1944
- Taxeotis intermixtaria (Walker, 1861)
- Taxeotis intextata (Guenée, 1857)
- Taxeotis isomeris Meyrick, 1890
- Taxeotis lechrioschema Turner, 1939
- Taxeotis limbosa Turner, 1933
- Taxeotis lygrophanes (Turner, 1943)
- Taxeotis maerens (Turner, 1939)
- Taxeotis mimela Prout, 1910
- Taxeotis notosticta Turner, 1936
- Taxeotis ochrosticta Turner, 1929
- Taxeotis oraula Meyrick, 1890
- Taxeotis orphnina Turner, 1904
- Taxeotis perlinearia (Walker, 1861)
- Taxeotis phaeopa Lower, 1899
- Taxeotis philodora Meyrick, 1890
- Taxeotis phricocyma Turner, 1929
- Taxeotis pleurostigma Turner, 1943
- Taxeotis pychnomochla Turner, 1939
- Taxeotis reserata (Walker, 1860)
- Taxeotis spodoides Turner, 1943
- Taxeotis stereospila Meyrick, 1890
- Taxeotis thegalea Turner, 1939
- Taxeotis xanthogramma Lower, 1903
