= Axiagasta stactogramma =

Scientific classification
- Kingdom: Animalia
- Phylum: Arthropoda
- Class: Insecta
- Order: Lepidoptera
- Family: Tineidae
- Genus: Axiagasta; Meyrick, 1930
- Species: A. stactogramma

Binomial name
- Axiagasta stactogramma Meyrick, 1930

Species of moth

Axiagasta stactogramma is the only species in the monotypic moth genus Axiagasta of the family Tineidae. It is found in Brazil. The genus name is a junior homonym that has apparently never been replaced.
