= Axiagasta (geometer moth) =

Scientific classification
- Kingdom: Animalia
- Phylum: Arthropoda
- Class: Insecta
- Order: Lepidoptera
- Family: Geometridae
- Subfamily: Oenochrominae
- Genus: Axiagasta; Turner, 1930

Genus of moths

Axiagasta is a genus of moths in the family Geometridae.

== Species ==
- Axiagasta rhodobaphes Turner, 1930
