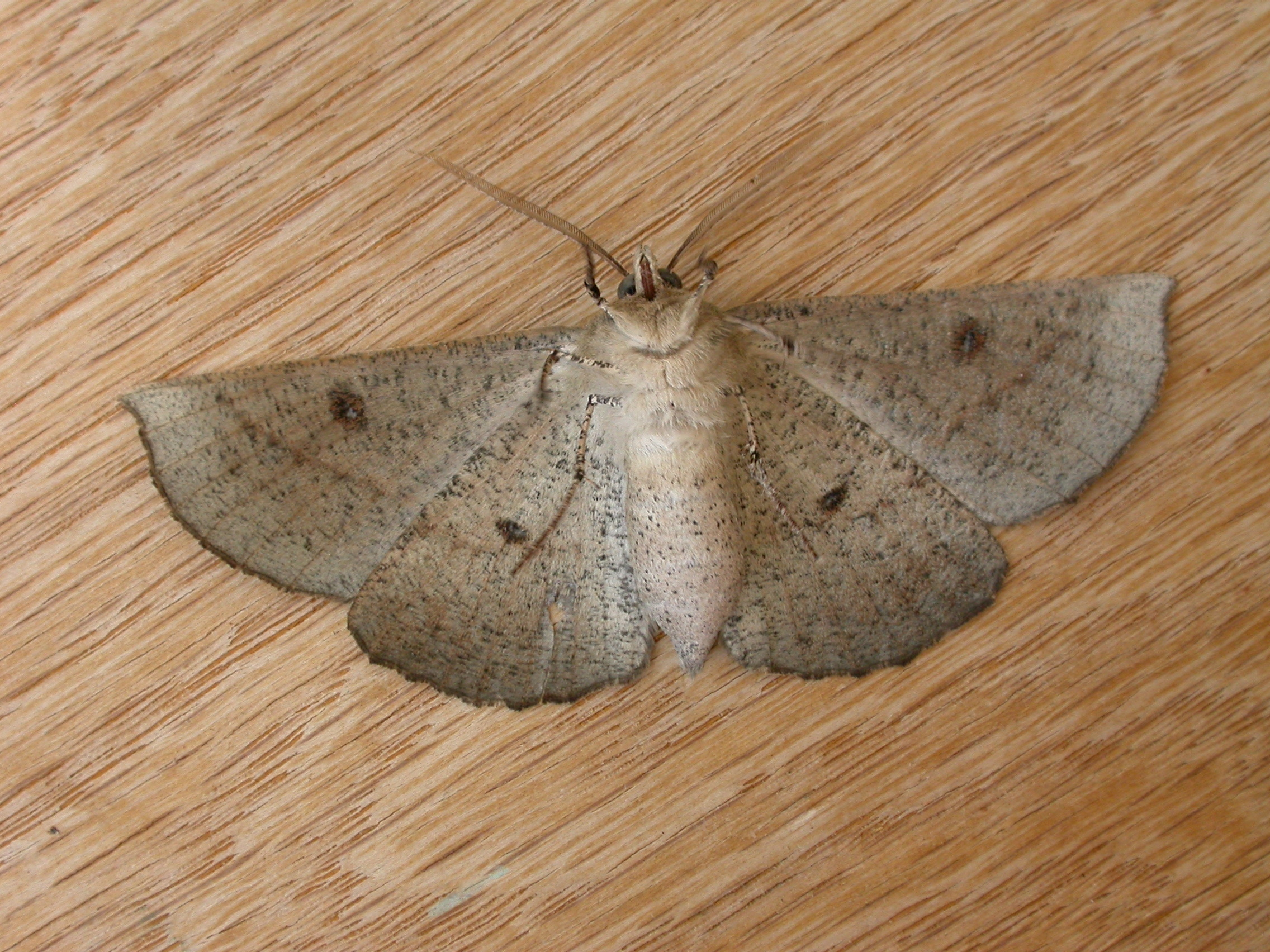

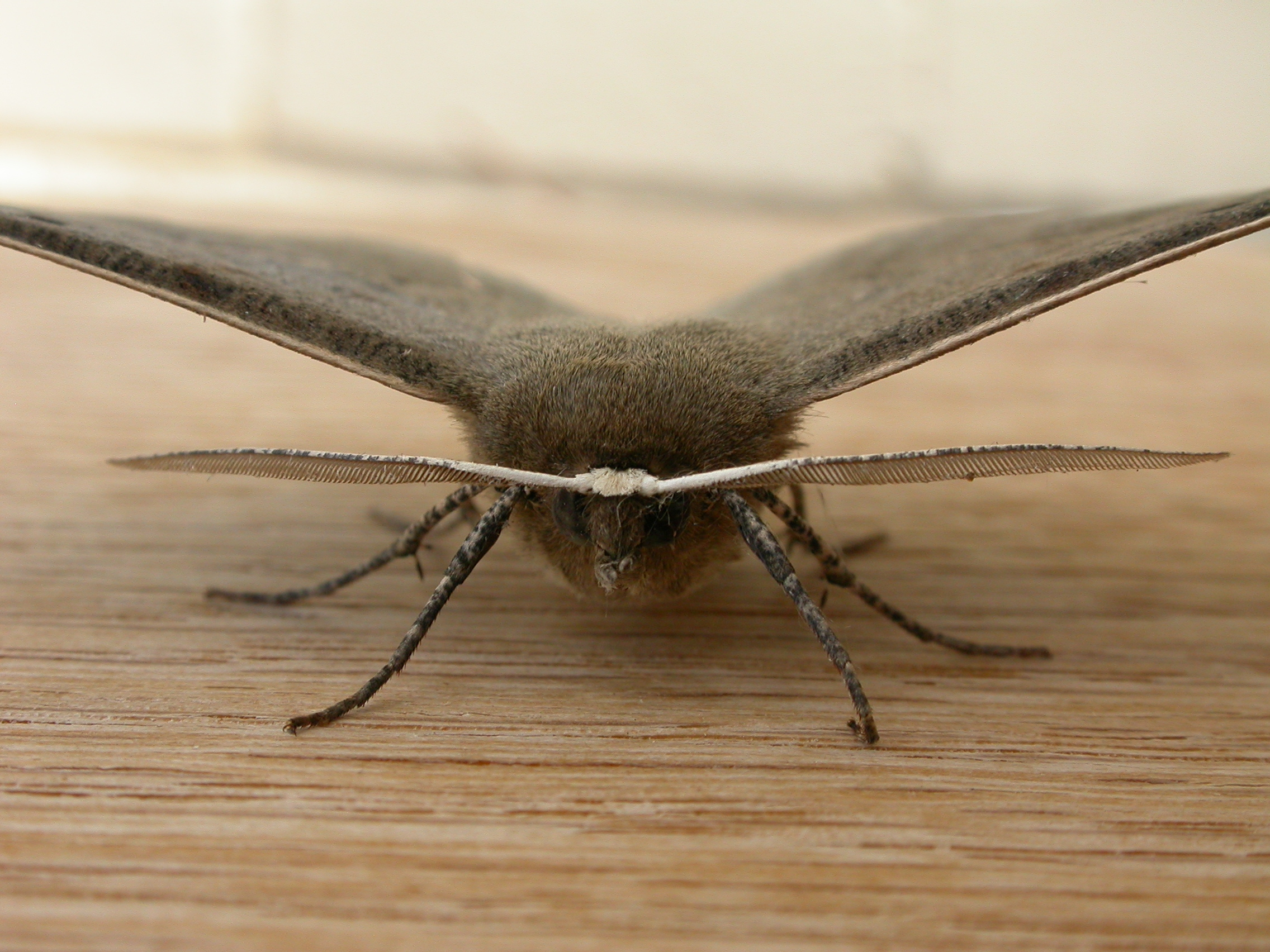

Scientific classification
- Kingdom: Animalia
- Phylum: Arthropoda
- Clade: Pancrustacea
- Class: Insecta
- Order: Lepidoptera
- Family: Geometridae
- Subfamily: Oenochrominae
- Genus: Phallaria; Guenée, 1857
- Species: P. ophiusaria

Binomial name
- Phallaria ophiusaria Guenée, 1857

Synonyms
- Oenochroma quaternaria Herrich-Schäffer, 1858; Smerinthus wayii Tepper, 1882

= Phallaria (moth) =

Species of moth

Phallaria ophiusaria, the large leaf moth, is the only species in the monotypic moth genus Phallaria in the family Geometridae. It is known from the Australian states of New South Wales, Queensland and Victoria. Both the genus and species were first described by Achille Guenée in 1857.

The wingspan is about 70 mm.
