= List of geometrid genera: A =

The very large moth family Geometridae contains genera beginning with A, B, C, D, E, F, G, H, I, J, K, L, M, N, O, P, Q, R, S, T, U, V, W, X, Y and Z.

Those beginning with A include:

- Abaciscus
- Abraxaphantes
- Abraxas
- Abraxesis
- Absala
- Acalyphes
- Acanthotoca
- Acasis
- Acauro
- Achagua
- Achlora
- Achrosis
- Acidaliastis
- Acidromodes
- Acodia
- Acollesis
- Acolutha
- Aconcagua
- Acrasia
- Acratodes
- Acrobiston
- Acrodontis
- Acronyctodes
- Acrosemia
- Acrostatheusis
- Acrotomia
- Acrotomodes
- Actenochroma
- Adactylotis
- Adalbertia
- Adeixis
- Adesmobathra
- Adeta
- Adicocrita
- Aenictes
- Aeolochroma
- Aepylopha
- Aeschrostoma
- Aethaloida
- Aethalura
- Aetheometra
- Aethiopodes
- Afriberina
- Afrophyla
- Agaraeus
- Agathia
- Agathiopsis
- Aglossophanes
- Agnibesa
- Agoschema
- Agriopis
- Albinospila
- Alcis
- Aletis
- Aleucis
- Alex
- Allaxitheca
- Allochlorodes
- Allochrostes
- Allocotesia
- Alloeopage
- Alloharpina
- Almabiston
- Almeria
- Almodes
- Aloba
- Alsophila
- Alsophiloides
- Altrivalvina
- Alydda
- Amaurinia
- Amblurodes
- Amblychia
- Amelora
- Ameria
- Ametris
- Amilapis
- Amnesicoma
- Amoebe
- Amoebotricha
- Amorphogynia
- Amorphozancle
- Amphibatodes
- Amphiclasta
- Amphicrossa
- Amphitape
- Amraica
- Amygdaloptera
- Amygdalopteryx
- Anaboarmia
- Anacamptodes
- Anachloris
- Anacleora
- Anacosymbia
- Anagoga
- Anapalta
- Anaplodes
- Anavinemina
- Anavitrinella
- Anchiphyllia
- Andania
- Andragrupos
- Androchela
- Androzeugma
- Anectropis
- Anemmetresa
- Anemplocia
- Angerona
- Anhibernia
- Ania
- Animomyia
- Anischnopteris
- Anisephyra
- Aniserpetes
- Anisocolpia
- Anisodes
- Anisogonia
- Anisographe
- Anisolasia
- Anisomelia
- Anisoperas
- Anisozyga
- Annemoria
- Anochthera
- Anoectomychus
- Anomocentris
- Anomocoetidia
- Anomoctena
- Anomogenes
- Anomozela
- Anomphax
- Anonychia
- Anoplosceles
- Anosiodes
- Ansorgia
- Antarchia
- Antasia
- Anteois
- Antepione
- Antepirrhoe
- Anthalma
- Antharmostes
- Anthemoctena
- Anthierax
- Anthometra
- Anthyperythra
- Anthyria
- Antibadistes
- Anticlea
- Anticleora
- Anticollix
- Antictenia
- Anticypella
- Antilurga
- Antilycauges
- Antimimistis
- Antipercnia
- Antipetelia
- Antiphoides
- Antitrygodes
- Antonechloris
- Antozola
- Antygophanes
- Anydrelia
- Aoshachia
- Aoshakuna
- Apaecasia
- Apallacta
- Apatadelpha
- Apeira
- Apericallia
- Aperusia
- Apetovia
- Aphanophleps
- Aphantes
- Aphantoloba
- Apheloceros
- Aphilopota
- Aphrogeneia
- Apicia
- Apiciopsis
- Apicrena
- Apithecia
- Aplasta
- Apleria
- Apleroneura
- Aplocera
- Aplochlora
- Aplodes
- Aplogompha
- Aplorama
- Apoaspilates
- Apocheima
- Apochima
- Apocleora
- Apocolotois
- Apodasmia
- Apodrepanulatrix
- Apodroma
- Apoheterolocha
- Apolema
- Aponotoreas
- Apopetelia
- Apophyga
- Apoplagodis
- Aporandria
- Aporhoptrina
- Aporoctena
- Apostates
- Apostegania
- Aposteira
- Apotheta
- Aprosdoceta
- Aracima
- Aragua
- Arauco
- Arbognophos
- Archaeobalbis
- Archaeocasis
- Archaeopseustes
- Archephanes
- Archichlora
- Archiearides
- Archiearis
- Archiplutodes
- Archirhoe
- Arcina
- Arcobara
- Arctesthes
- Arctoscelia
- Arcyonia
- Ardonis
- Argidava
- Argua
- Argyris
- Argyrocosma
- Argyrographa
- Argyrophora
- Argyroplutodes
- Argyroscelia
- Argyrotome
- Arhodia
- Arichanna
- Arilophia
- Arizela
- Arrayanaria
- Artemidora
- Artiora
- Arycanda
- Asaphodes
- Ascotis
- Asestra
- Asiona
- Asmate
- Asovia
- Aspilaria
- Aspilatopsis
- Aspilobapta
- Aspilonaxa
- Aspitates
- Astacuda
- Astalotesia
- Astatomorpha
- Astegania
- Asthena
- Astheniodes
- Asthenophleps
- Asthenotricha
- Astrapephora
- Astygisa
- Astyochia
- Ateloptila
- Aterpnodes
- Athroolopha
- Atmoceras
- Atomorpha
- Atopodes
- Atopophysa
- Atyria
- Atyriodes
- Auaxa
- Audia
- Aulopola
- Auophylla
- Auophyllodes
- Austrocidaria
- Austroterpna
- Autallacta
- Autanepsia
- Authaemon
- Automolodes
- Autophylla
- Autotrichia
- Auxima
- Auzeodes
- Aventiopsis
- Axiagasta
- Axinoptera
- Axiodes
- Azata
- Azelina
- Azelinopsis
- Azyx
