= Ophiogramma =

Scientific classification
- Kingdom: Animalia
- Phylum: Arthropoda
- Clade: Pancrustacea
- Class: Insecta
- Order: Lepidoptera
- Family: Geometridae
- Genus: Ophiogramma; Hübner, [1831]

Synonyms
- Achlora Guenée, 1858; Euctenachlora Warren, 1894

Genus of moths

Ophiogramma is a genus of moths in the family Geometridae first described by Jacob Hübner in 1831.

== Species ==
- Ophiogramma coenobiata (Felder & Rogenhofer, 1875)
- Ophiogramma injunctaria Hübner, [1831]
