= Apodasmia =

Apodasmia may refer to:

- Apodasmia (moth) - a moth genus in the family Geometridae
- Apodasmia (plant) - a plant genus in the family Restionaceae
