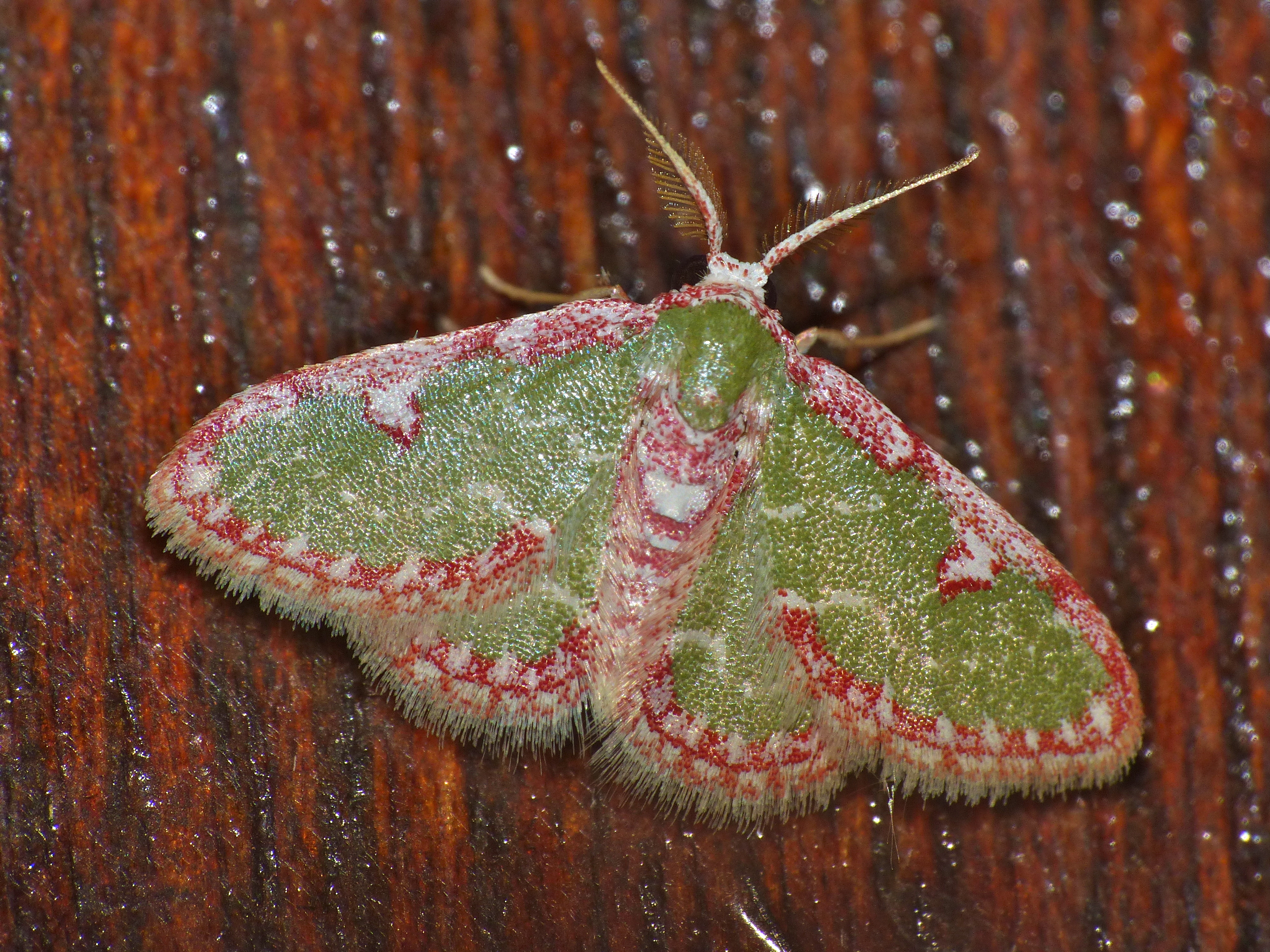
- In South Africa

Scientific classification
- Kingdom: Animalia
- Phylum: Arthropoda
- Clade: Pancrustacea
- Class: Insecta
- Order: Lepidoptera
- Family: Geometridae
- Genus: Allochrostes
- Species: A. biornata

Binomial name
- Allochrostes biornata Prout, 1913

= Allochrostes biornata =

Ornate emerald

Species of moth

Allochrostes biornata, the ornate emerald, is a species of moth in the family Geometridae described by Louis Beethoven Prout in 1913. It is native to the Afrotropics, and has been recorded in the DRC, Kenya, Mozambique, Zimbabwe, South Africa and Namibia.
