= Tacparia zalissaria =

Scientific classification
- Kingdom: Animalia
- Phylum: Arthropoda
- Class: Insecta
- Order: Lepidoptera
- Family: Geometridae
- Tribe: Lithinini
- Genus: Tacparia
- Species: T. zalissaria

Binomial name
- Tacparia zalissaria Walker, 1860

Species of moth

Tacparia zalissaria is a species of geometrid moth in the family Geometridae. It is found in North America.

The MONA or Hodges number for Tacparia zalissaria is 6805.
