= Phyllia =

Scientific classification
- Kingdom: Animalia
- Phylum: Arthropoda
- Class: Insecta
- Order: Lepidoptera
- Family: Geometridae
- Subfamily: Larentiinae
- Genus: Phyllia; Blanchard, 1852
- Species: P. triangularia

Binomial name
- Phyllia triangularia Blanchard, 1852

Genus of moths

Phyllia is a monotypic moth genus in the family Geometridae. It is considered by Luis E. Parra and Carla A. Alvear to be a synonym of Ennada. As a genus, its only species is Phyllia triangularia, which is found in Chile. Both the genus and species were described by Blanchard in 1852.
