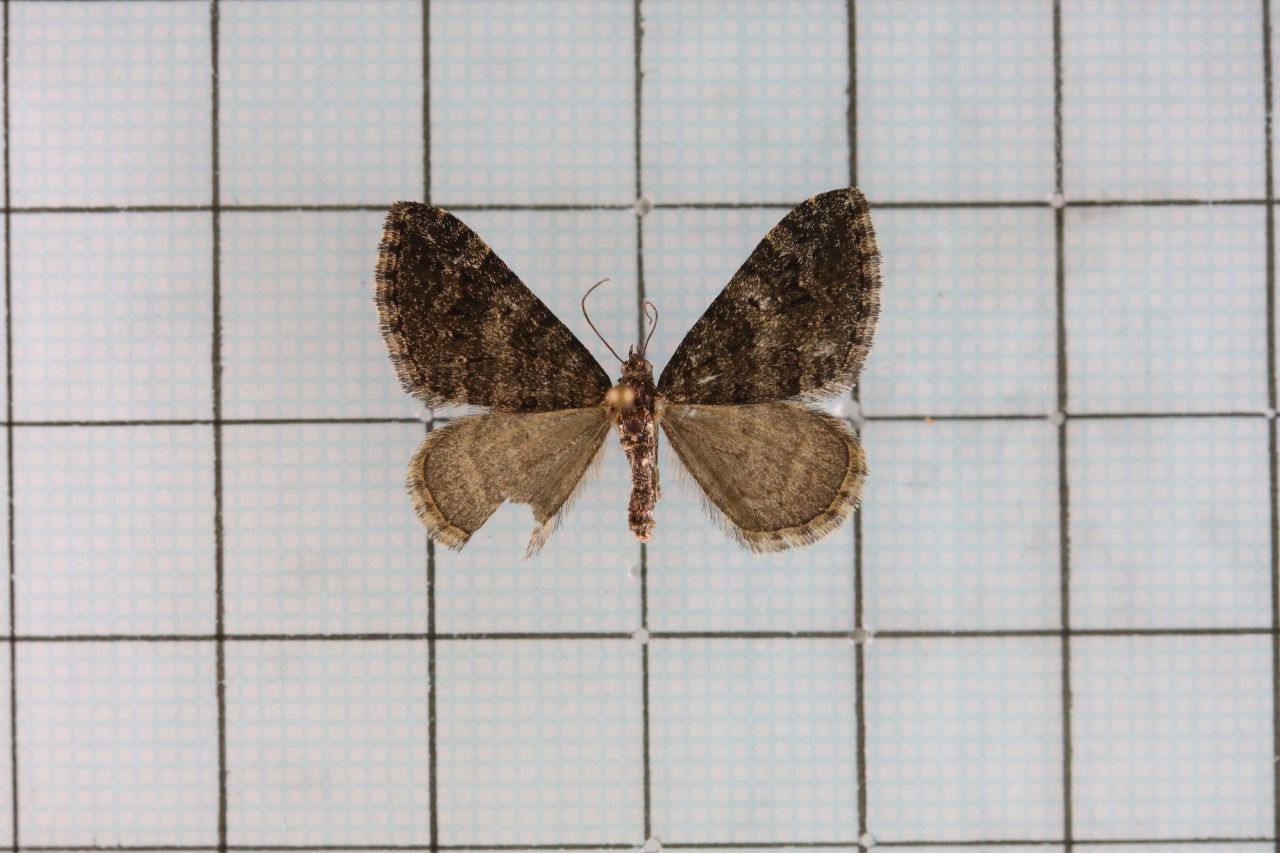

Scientific classification
- Kingdom: Animalia
- Phylum: Arthropoda
- Clade: Pancrustacea
- Class: Insecta
- Order: Lepidoptera
- Family: Geometridae
- Genus: Atopophysa
- Species: A. opulens

Binomial name
- Atopophysa opulens L. B. Prout, 1914

= Atopophysa opulens =

Species of moth

Atopophysa opulens is a moth of the family Geometridae first described by Louis Beethoven Prout in 1914. It is found in Taiwan.

The wingspan is 25–32 mm.
