= Ennada =

Scientific classification
- Kingdom: Animalia
- Phylum: Arthropoda
- Class: Insecta
- Order: Lepidoptera
- Family: Geometridae
- Tribe: Larentiini
- Genus: Ennada; Blanchard, 1852

Synonyms
- Anchiphyllia Butler 1893; Phyllia Blanchard 1852

Genus of moths

Ennada is a genus of moths in the family Geometridae.

== Species ==
- Ennada blanchardi Parra & Alvear, 2009
- Ennada flavaria Blanchard, 1852
- Ennada pellicata (Felder & Rogenhofer 1875)
