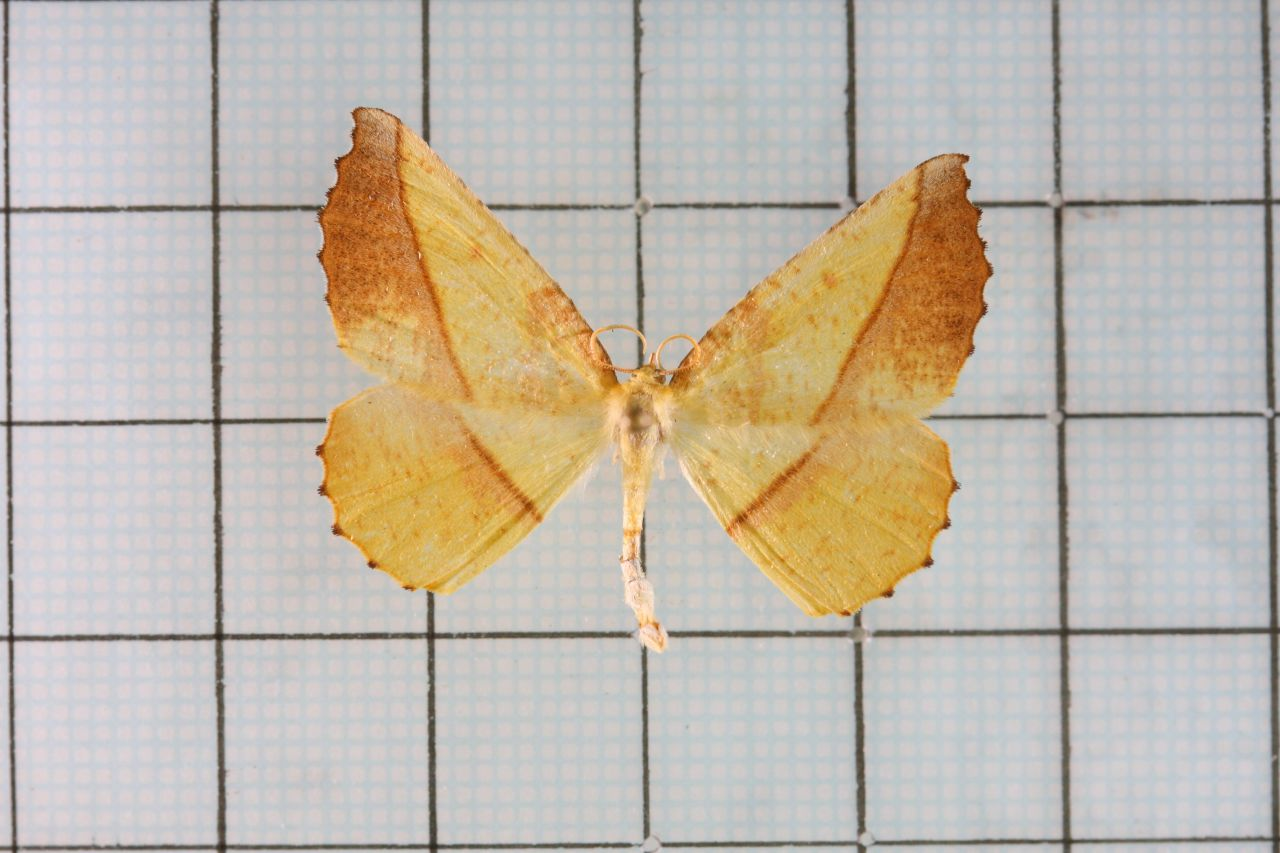

Scientific classification
- Kingdom: Animalia
- Phylum: Arthropoda
- Class: Insecta
- Order: Lepidoptera
- Family: Geometridae
- Genus: Auaxa
- Species: A. cesadaria

Binomial name
- Auaxa cesadaria Walker, 1860

= Auaxa cesadaria =

Species of moth

Auaxa cesadaria is a moth of the family Geometridae. It is found in Taiwan, China and Japan.

The wingspan is 33–39 mm.
