= Aspilaria =

Scientific classification
- Kingdom: Animalia
- Phylum: Arthropoda
- Class: Insecta
- Order: Lepidoptera
- Family: Geometridae
- Subfamily: Ennominae
- Genus: Aspilaria; Staudinger, 1898

Genus of moths

Aspilaria is a genus of moths in the family Geometridae. Pitkin (2002) treated it as a synonym of Euclidiodes.
