= Tacparia atropunctata =

Scientific classification
- Kingdom: Animalia
- Phylum: Arthropoda
- Clade: Pancrustacea
- Class: Insecta
- Order: Lepidoptera
- Family: Geometridae
- Tribe: Lithinini
- Genus: Tacparia
- Species: T. atropunctata

Binomial name
- Tacparia atropunctata (Packard, 1874)

Species of moth

Tacparia atropunctata is a species of geometrid moth in the family Geometridae. It is found in North America.

The MONA or Hodges number for Tacparia atropunctata is 6806.
