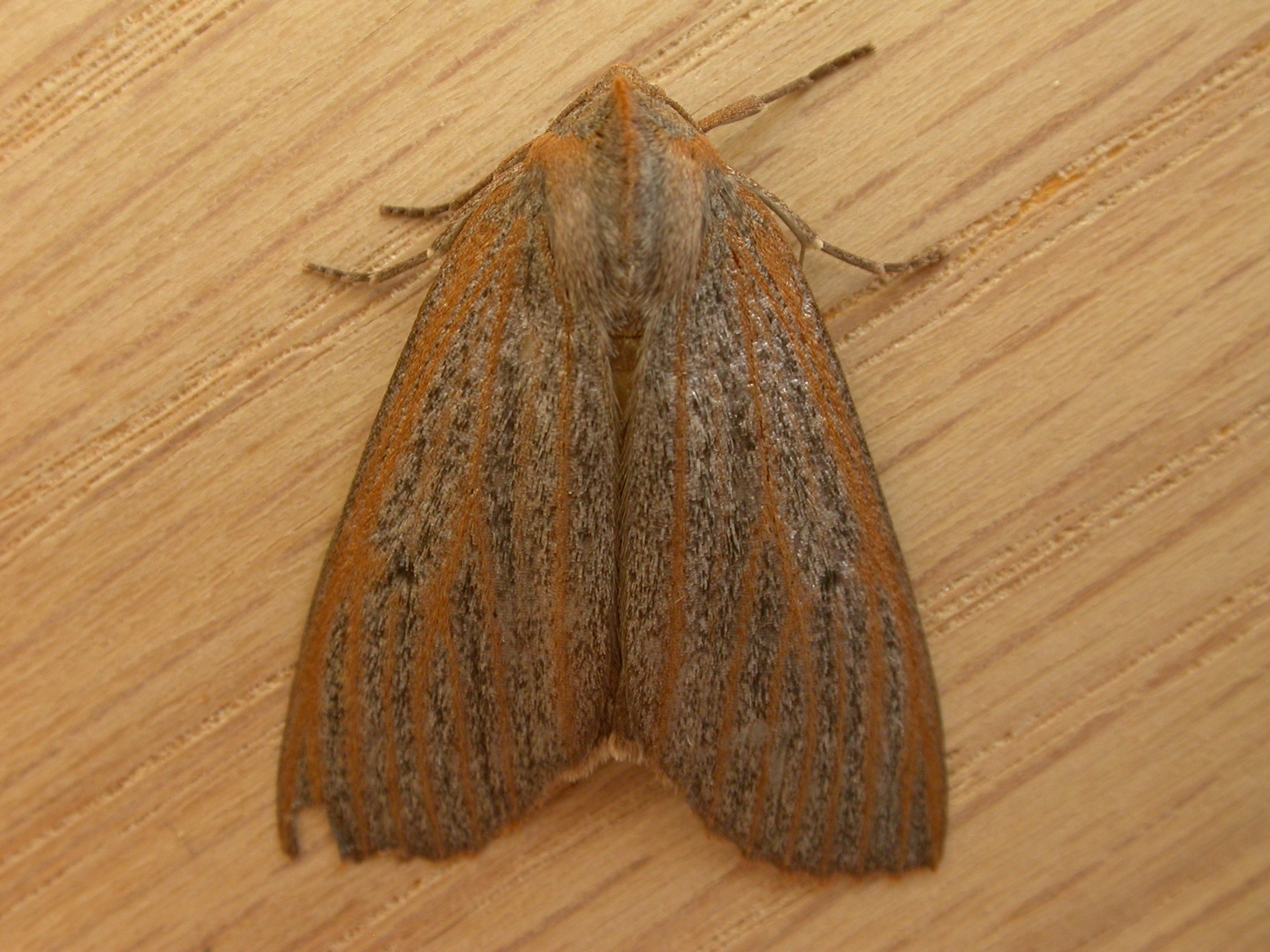

Scientific classification
- Kingdom: Animalia
- Phylum: Arthropoda
- Class: Insecta
- Order: Lepidoptera
- Family: Geometridae
- Genus: Paralaea
- Species: P. porphyrinaria

Binomial name
- Paralaea porphyrinaria (Guenée, 1857)

Synonyms
- Chlenias porphyrinaria Guenée, 1857; Palleopa rufivena Walker, 1866

= Paralaea porphyrinaria =

Species of moth

Paralaea porphyrinaria is a moth of the family Geometridae. It is found in southern Australia, including Tasmania.

The wingspan is about 60 mm.

The larvae feed on the foliage of Eucalyptus species.
