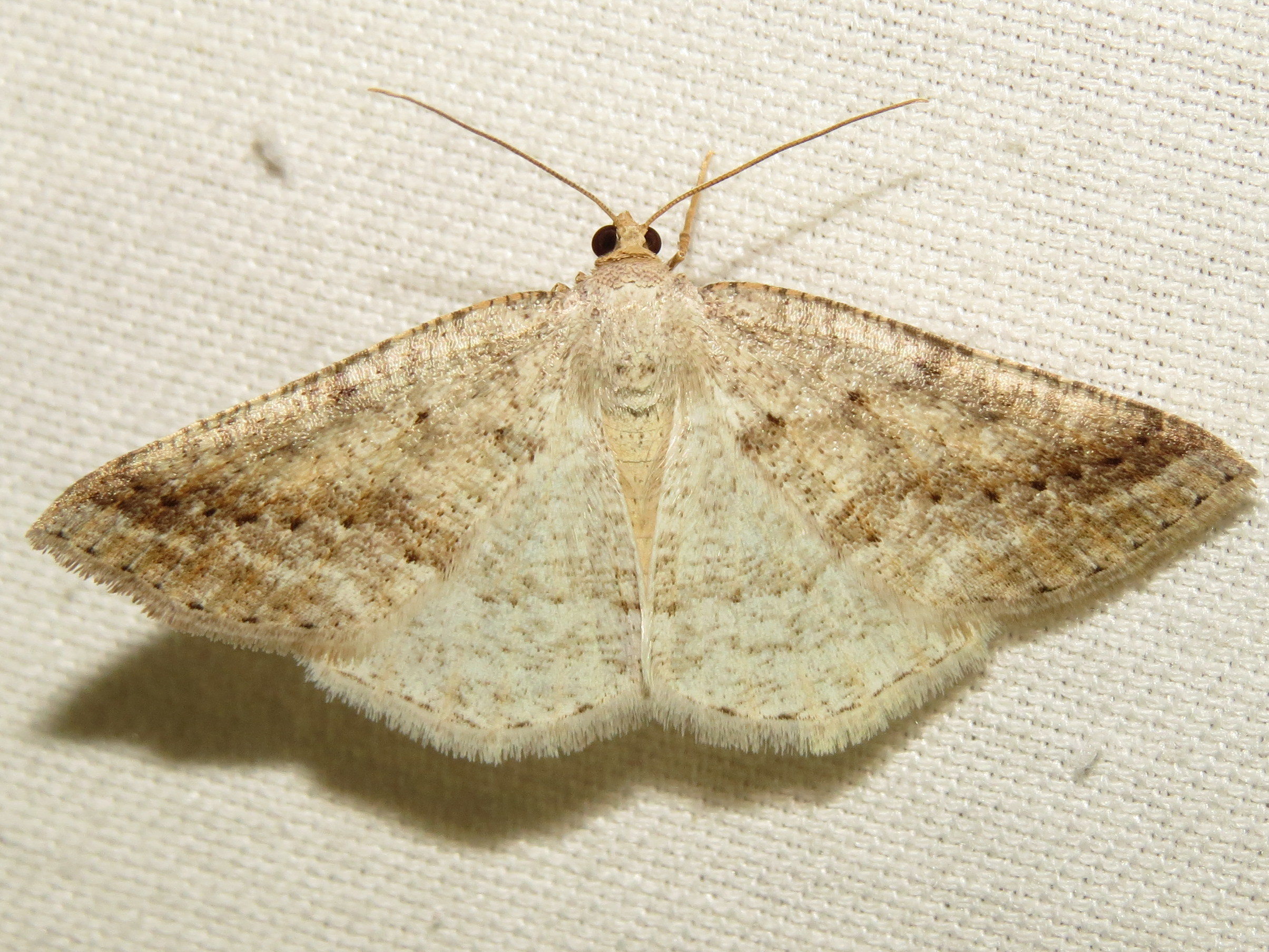
- Image from Searsmont, Maine

Scientific classification
- Kingdom: Animalia
- Phylum: Arthropoda
- Class: Insecta
- Order: Lepidoptera
- Family: Geometridae
- Tribe: Lithinini
- Genus: Tacparia
- Species: T. detersata

Binomial name
- Tacparia detersata (Guenée in Boisduval & Guenée, 1858)

= Tacparia detersata =

Species of moth

Tacparia detersata, the pale alder moth, is a species of geometrid moth in the family Geometridae. It is found in North America.
