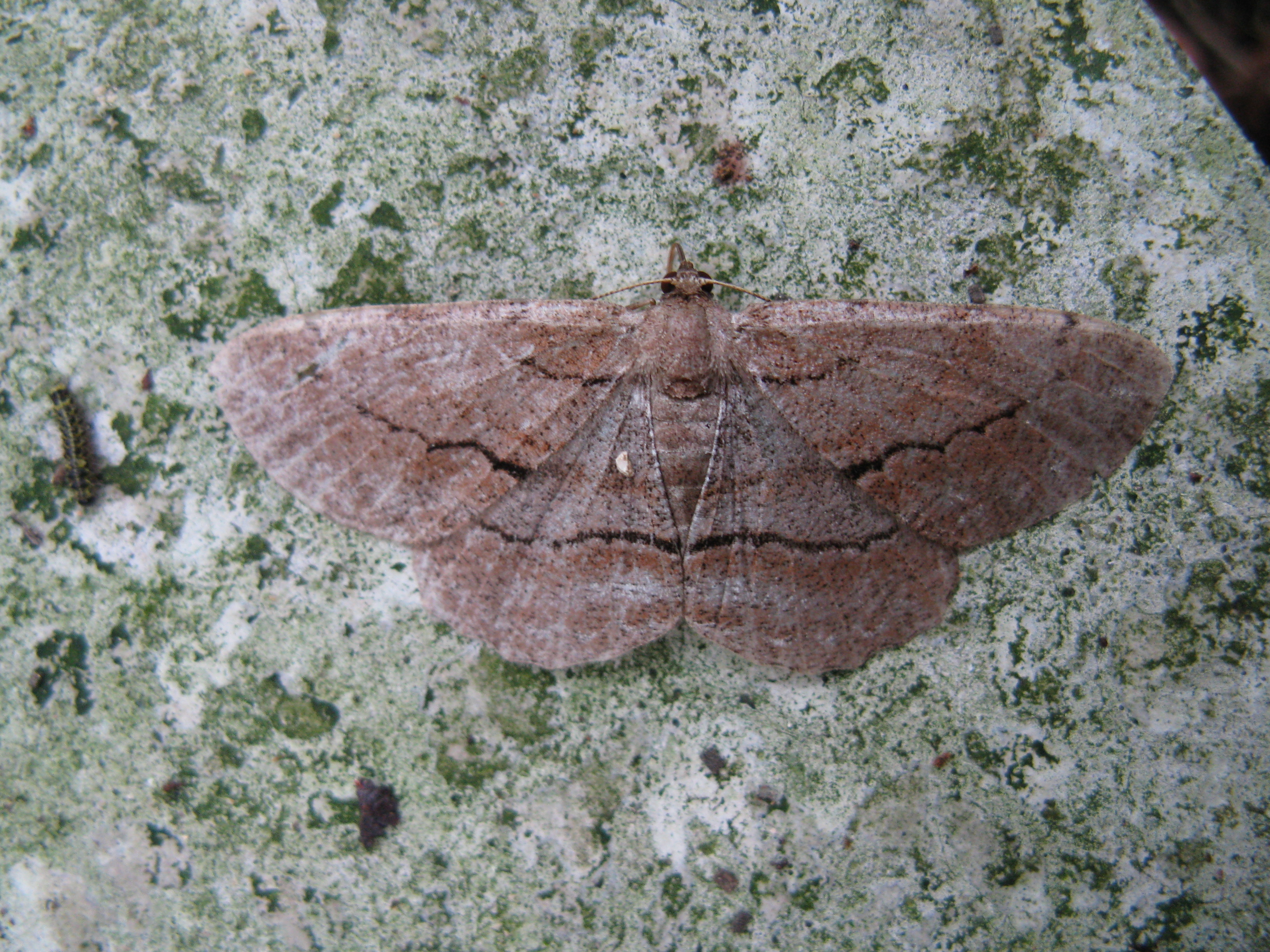

Scientific classification
- Domain: Eukaryota
- Kingdom: Animalia
- Phylum: Arthropoda
- Class: Insecta
- Order: Lepidoptera
- Family: Geometridae
- Genus: Apocleora
- Species: A. rimosa

Binomial name
- Apocleora rimosa Butler, 1879

Synonyms
- Boarmia rimosa Butler, 1879

= Apocleora rimosa =

Species of moth

Apocleora rimosa is a moth of the family Geometridae first described by Arthur Gardiner Butler in 1879. It is found in Japan.

The wingspan is 33–35 mm.
