= Anomoctena =

Scientific classification
- Kingdom: Animalia
- Phylum: Arthropoda
- Class: Insecta
- Order: Lepidoptera
- Family: Geometridae
- Subfamily: Ennominae
- Genus: Anomoctena

Genus of geometer moths

Anomoctena is a genus of moths in the family Geometridae. It is a junior subjective synonym of Dysbatus.
