= Animomyia minuta =

Scientific classification
- Kingdom: Animalia
- Phylum: Arthropoda
- Clade: Pancrustacea
- Class: Insecta
- Order: Lepidoptera
- Family: Geometridae
- Tribe: Nacophorini
- Genus: Animomyia
- Species: A. minuta

Binomial name
- Animomyia minuta Rindge, 1974

Species of moth

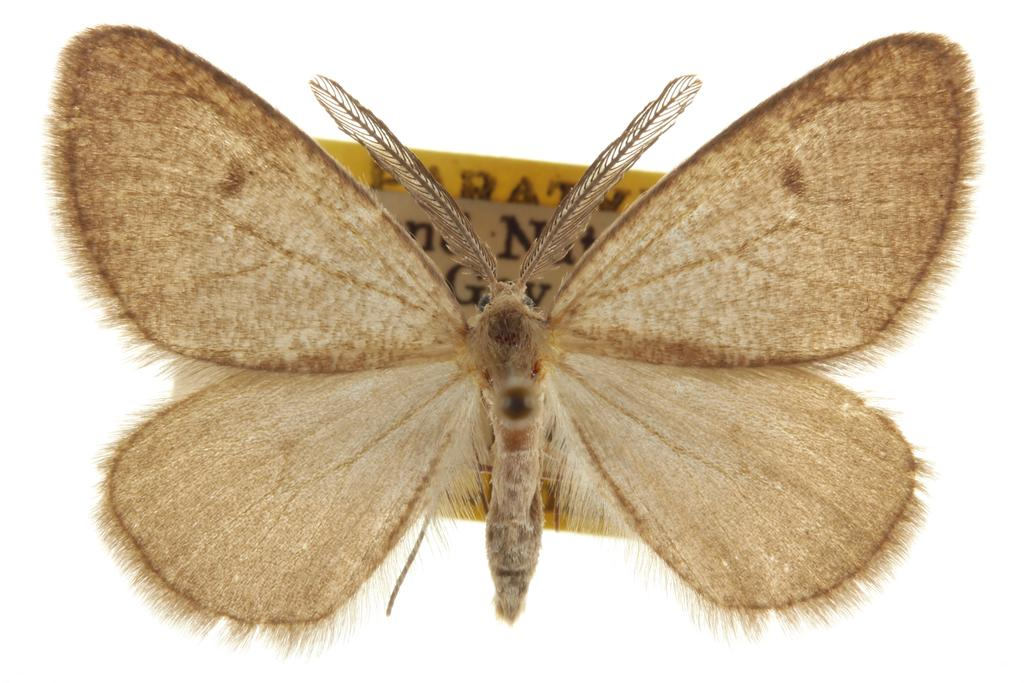
Animomyia minuta

Animomyia minuta is a species of geometrid moth in the family Geometridae. It is found in North America.

The MONA or Hodges number for Animomyia minuta is 6794.
