= Aterpnodes =

Scientific classification
- Kingdom: Animalia
- Phylum: Arthropoda
- Class: Insecta
- Order: Lepidoptera
- Family: Geometridae
- Subfamily: Ennominae
- Genus: Aterpnodes

Genus of moths

Aterpnodes is a genus of moths in the family Geometridae. The genus previously included Syrrhizodes species S. rubripennis, but it is currently a monotypic taxon consisting solely of Aterpnodes geminipuncta.

A. geminipuncta was discovered in and remains endemic to Costa Rica. Its overall anatomy superficially resembles that of Parilexia, but distinct differences in wing, genital, and antennae structure suggest that their genera are independent of one another.
