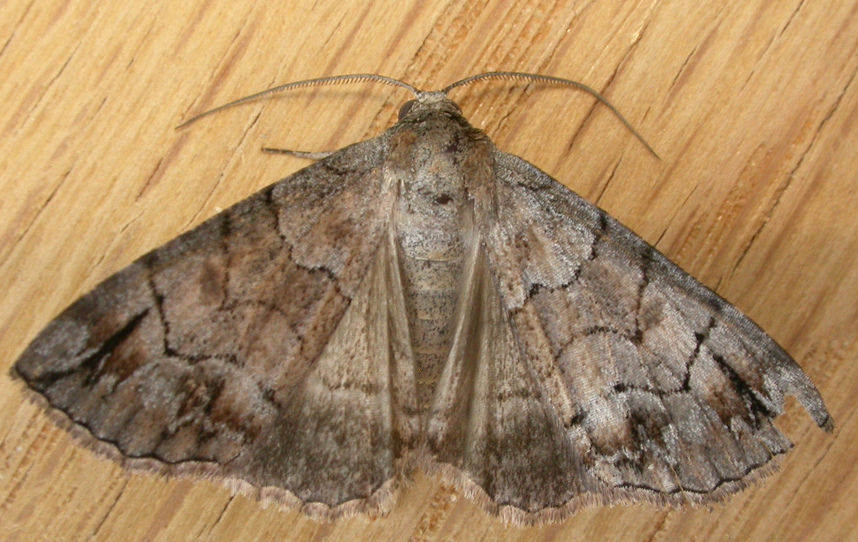

Scientific classification
- Domain: Eukaryota
- Kingdom: Animalia
- Phylum: Arthropoda
- Class: Insecta
- Order: Lepidoptera
- Family: Geometridae
- Genus: Dysbatus
- Species: D. stenodesma

Binomial name
- Dysbatus stenodesma Lower, 1899

= Dysbatus stenodesma =

Species of moth

Dysbatus stenodesma is a moth of the family Geometridae first described by Oswald Bertram Lower in 1899. It is found in Australia.
