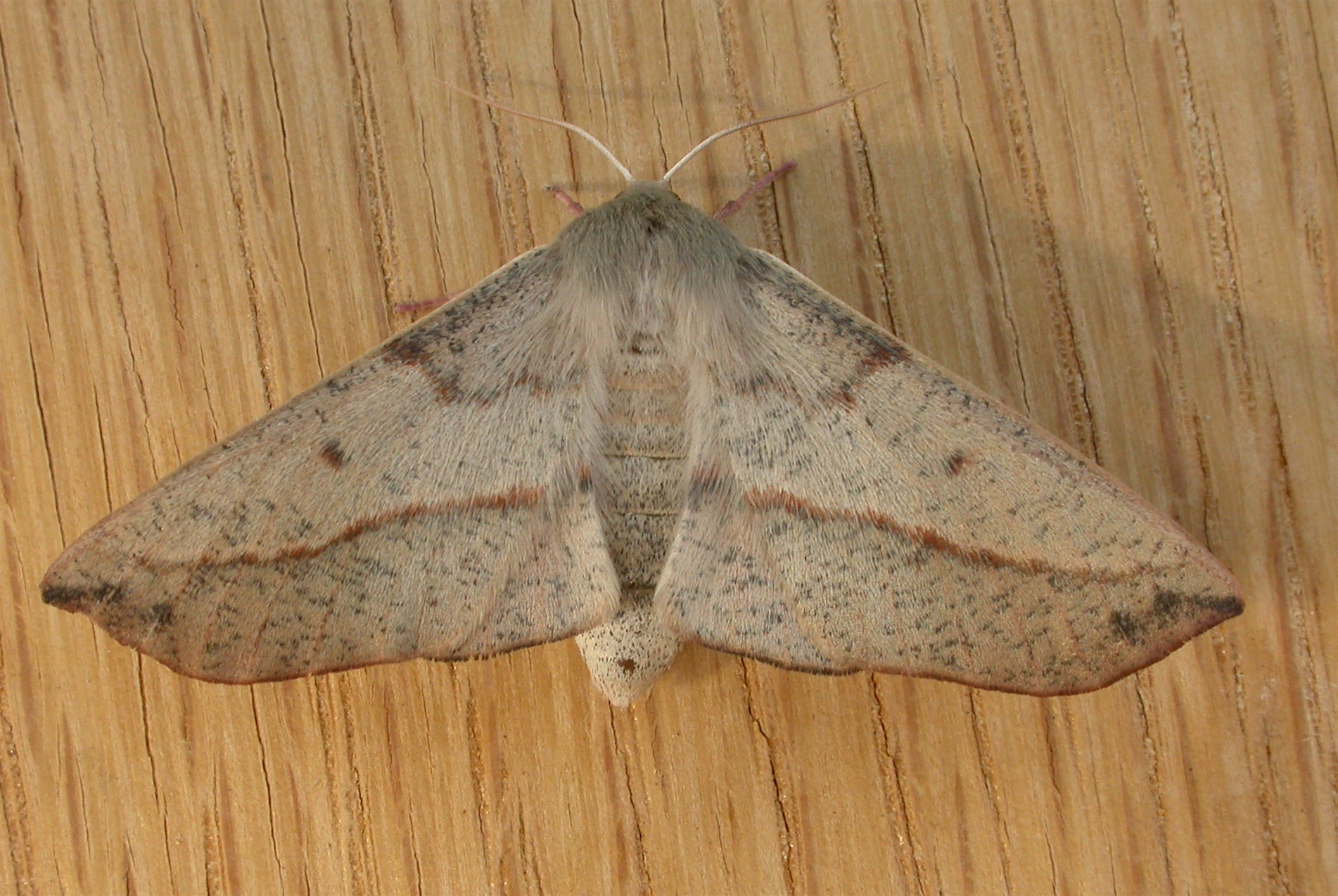

Scientific classification
- Domain: Eukaryota
- Kingdom: Animalia
- Phylum: Arthropoda
- Class: Insecta
- Order: Lepidoptera
- Family: Geometridae
- Genus: Antictenia
- Species: A. punctunculus

Binomial name
- Antictenia punctunculus (T. P. Lucas, 1892)

= Antictenia punctunculus =

Species of moth

Antictenia punctunculus is a species of moth of the family Geometridae first described by Thomas Pennington Lucas in 1892. It is found in Australia.
