= Clannuda =

Town of ancient Phrygia

Coordinates: 38°29′43″N 29°39′29″E

Clannuda or Klannouda (Ancient Greek: Κλαννουδα) was a town of ancient Phrygia, inhabited in Hellenistic, Roman, and Byzantine times. It was mentioned in the Peutinger Table as Clanudda, which places it 30 M.P. from Aludda and 35 M.P. from Philadelphia.

Its site is located near Çırpıcılar in Asiatic Turkey.
