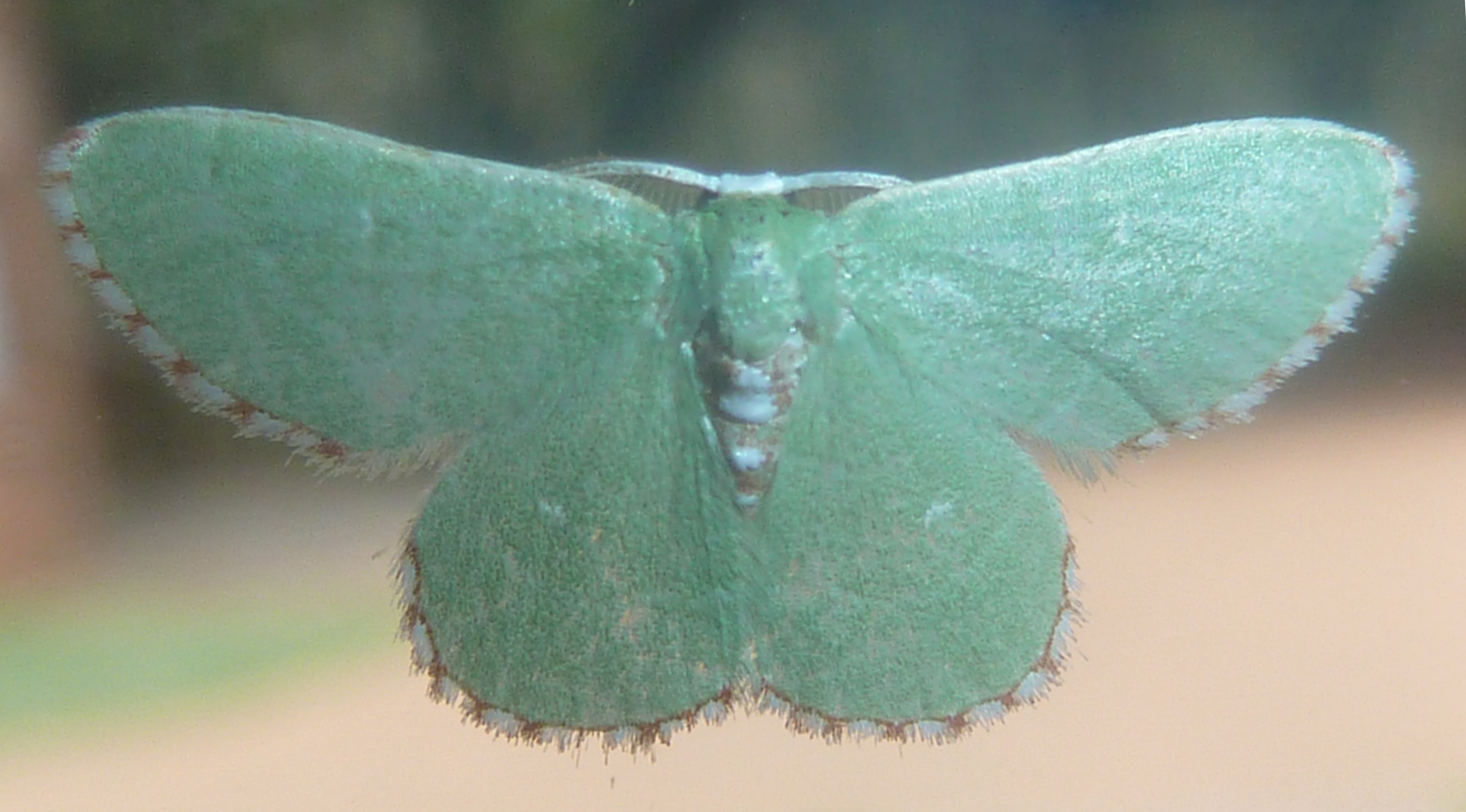
- In South Africa

Scientific classification
- Kingdom: Animalia
- Phylum: Arthropoda
- Class: Insecta
- Order: Lepidoptera
- Family: Geometridae
- Genus: Allochrostes
- Species: A. saliata

Binomial name
- Allochrostes saliata (Felder & Rogenhofer, 1875)

Synonyms
- Racheospila saliata Felder & Rogenhofer, 1875

= Allochrostes saliata =

Species of moth

Allochrostes saliata is a species of moth in the family Geometridae. It is native to the Afrotropics, and has been recorded in Kenya, Zambia and South Africa.
