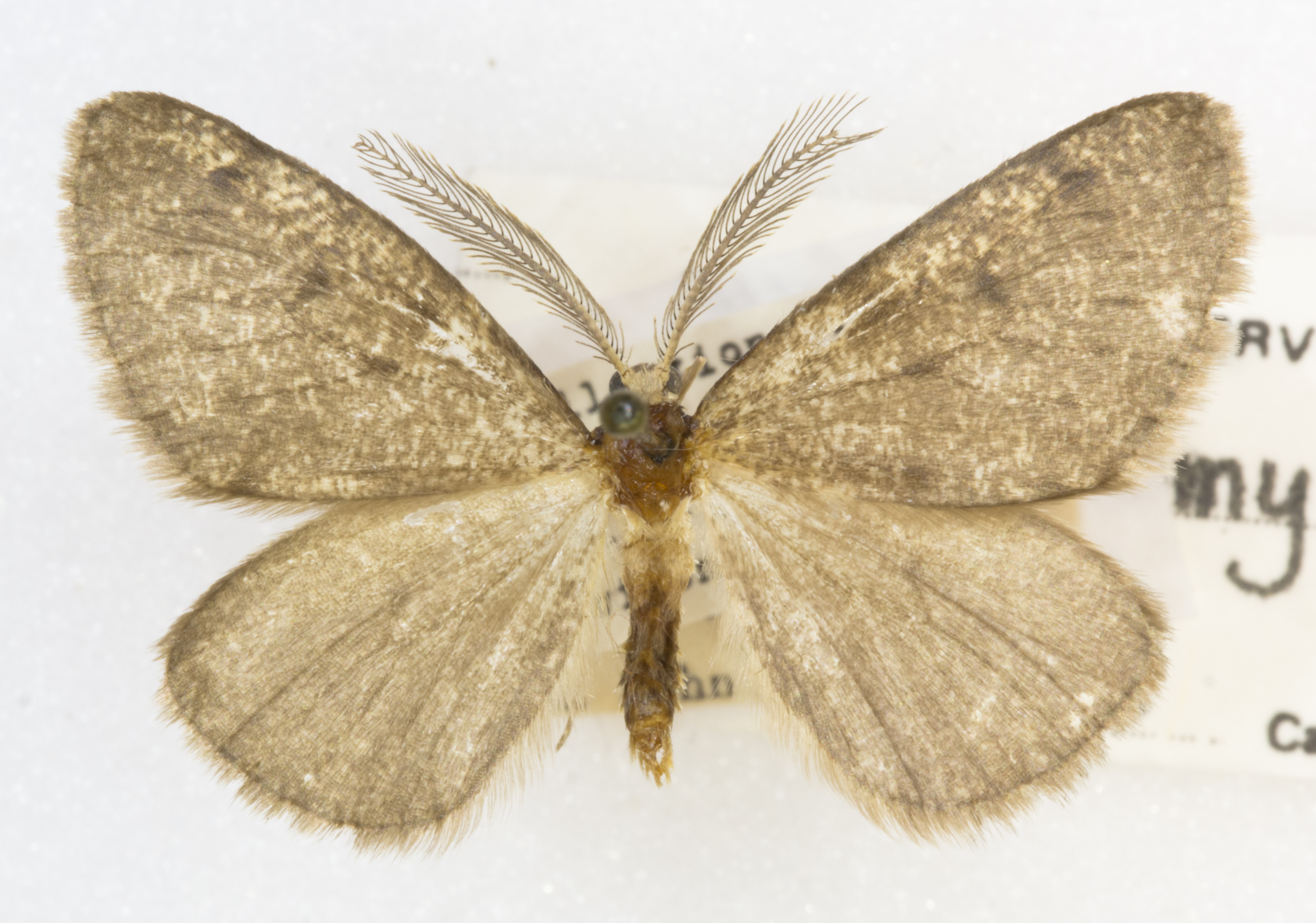

Scientific classification
- Domain: Eukaryota
- Kingdom: Animalia
- Phylum: Arthropoda
- Class: Insecta
- Order: Lepidoptera
- Family: Geometridae
- Genus: Animomyia
- Species: A. smithii

Binomial name
- Animomyia smithii (Pearsall, 1910)

= Animomyia smithii =

Species of moth

Animomyia smithii is a species of geometrid moth in the family Geometridae. It is found in North America.

The MONA or Hodges number for Animomyia smithii is 6788.

== Subspecies ==
These three subspecies belong to the species Animomyia smithii:

- Animomyia smithii magna Rindge, 1974
- Animomyia smithii nigris Cass & Swett, 1923
- Animomyia smithii smithii
