= Apaecasia =

Scientific classification
- Kingdom: Animalia
- Phylum: Arthropoda
- Clade: Pancrustacea
- Class: Insecta
- Order: Lepidoptera
- Family: Geometridae
- Subfamily: Ennominae
- Genus: Apaecasia

Genus of geometer moths

Apaecasia (synonym of Tacparia) is a genus of moths in the family Geometridae.
