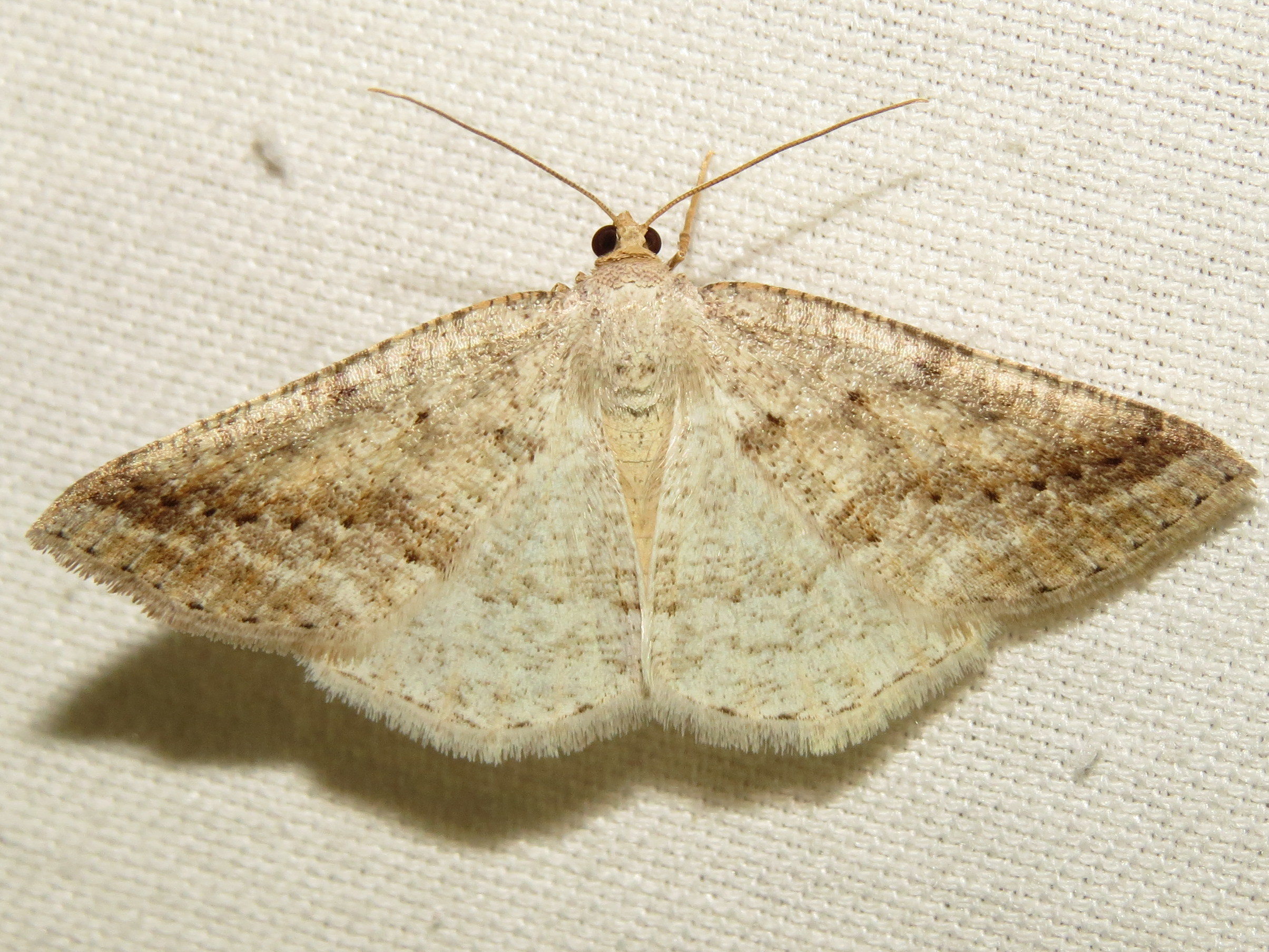
- Tacparia detersata

Scientific classification
- Kingdom: Animalia
- Phylum: Arthropoda
- Class: Insecta
- Order: Lepidoptera
- Family: Geometridae
- Tribe: Lithinini
- Genus: Tacparia; Walker, 1860

= Tacparia =

Genus of moths

Tacparia is a genus of moths in the family Geometridae erected by Francis Walker in 1860.

== Species ==
- Tacparia zalissaria Walker, 1860
- Tacparia atropunctata (Packard, 1874)
- Tacparia detersata (Guenée, 1857)
