= Autophylla =

Scientific classification
- Kingdom: Animalia
- Phylum: Arthropoda
- Class: Insecta
- Order: Lepidoptera
- Family: Geometridae
- Subfamily: Ennominae
- Genus: Autophylla; Warren, 1894

Genus of moths

Autophylla is a genus of moths in the family Geometridae.

== Species ==
- Autophylla pallida Warren, 1894
