= Alydda =

Town of ancient Phrygia

Alydda or Aludda (Ancient Greek: Ἄλυδδα) was a town of ancient Phrygia, inhabited in Roman and Byzantine times. It was mentioned in the Peutinger Table as Aludda, which places it 30 M.P. from Clanudda and 25 M.P. from Agmonia.

Its site is unlocated.
