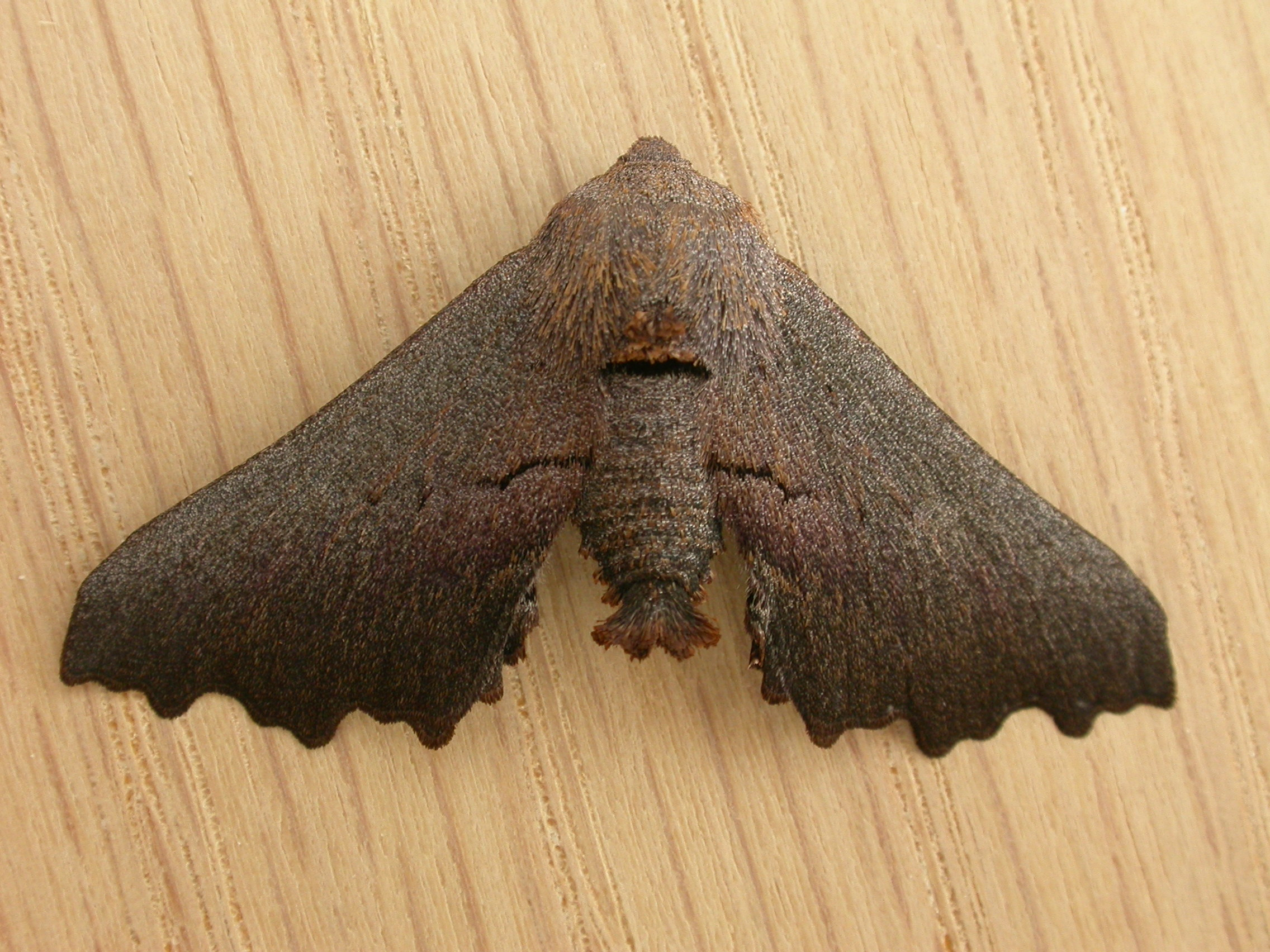

Scientific classification
- Kingdom: Animalia
- Phylum: Arthropoda
- Clade: Pancrustacea
- Class: Insecta
- Order: Lepidoptera
- Family: Geometridae
- Tribe: Diptychini
- Genus: Amphiclasta; Turner, 1906

Type species
- Amphiclasta lygaea Turner, 1906

= Amphiclasta =

Genus of moths

Amphiclasta is a monotypic moth genus in the family Geometridae. Its only species, Amphiclasta lygaea, is found in Australia. Both the genus and species were first described by Alfred Jefferis Turner in 1906.
