= Asestra =

Scientific classification
- Kingdom: Animalia
- Phylum: Arthropoda
- Clade: Pancrustacea
- Class: Insecta
- Order: Lepidoptera
- Family: Geometridae
- Subfamily: Ennominae
- Genus: Asestra; Warren, 1895

Type species
- Pseudosestra bella Butler, 1882

Genus of moths

Asestra is a genus of moths in the family Geometridae. It was described by William Warren in 1895.
