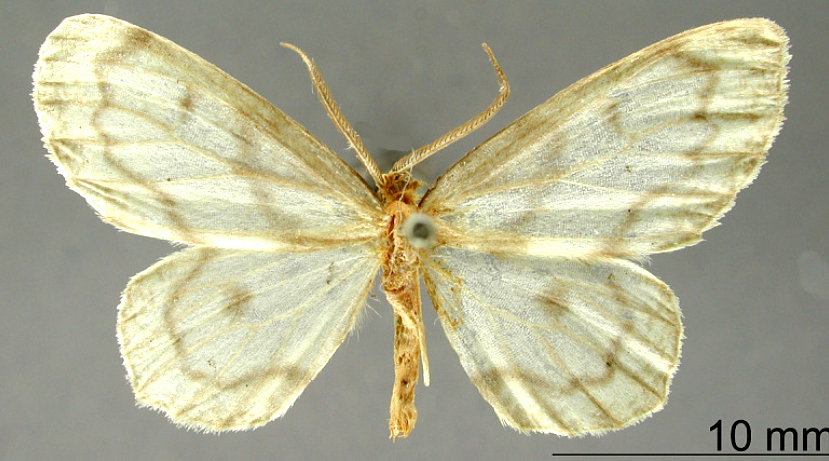
- Astyochia lachesis

Scientific classification
- Kingdom: Animalia
- Phylum: Arthropoda
- Class: Insecta
- Order: Lepidoptera
- Family: Geometridae
- Subfamily: Ennominae
- Genus: Astyochia; Druce in Godman & Salvin, 1885

= Astyochia =

Genus of moths

Astyochia is a genus of moths in the family Geometridae.

== Species ==
- Astyochia crane Druce, 1885
- Astyochia faula Druce, 1885
- Astyochia fessonia Druce, 1885
- Astyochia lachesis Schaus, 1912 - Costa Rica
- Astyochia nigrivena (Warren, 1897)
- Astyochia nigrivenata (Warren, 1900)
