= Acrosemia =

Scientific classification
- Kingdom: Animalia
- Phylum: Arthropoda
- Class: Insecta
- Order: Lepidoptera
- Family: Geometridae
- Subfamily: Geometrinae
- Genus: Acrosemia; Herrich-Schäffer, [1855]

Genus of geometer moths

Acrosemia is a genus of moths in the family Geometridae erected by Gottlieb August Wilhelm Herrich-Schäffer in 1855.

== Species ==
- Acrosemia vulpecularia Herrich-Schäffer, [1855]
- Acrosemia dichorda Hampson, 1904
