= Astrapephora =

Scientific classification
- Kingdom: Animalia
- Phylum: Arthropoda
- Class: Insecta
- Order: Lepidoptera
- Family: Geometridae
- Subfamily: Ennominae
- Genus: Astrapephora; Alphéraky, 1892

Type species
- Astrapephora romanovi Alphéraky, 1892

Genus of moths

Astrapephora is a monotypic genus of moths in the family Geometridae. The type and only species in this genus is Astrapephora romanovi, found in Tibet. They were described by Sergei Alphéraky in 1892.
