= Agoschema =

Scientific classification
- Kingdom: Animalia
- Phylum: Arthropoda
- Clade: Pancrustacea
- Class: Insecta
- Order: Lepidoptera
- Family: Geometridae
- Subfamily: Geometrinae
- Genus: Agoschema; Prout, 1912
- Species: A. goniata

Binomial name
- Agoschema goniata Warren, 1898

Synonyms
- Dysschema Warren, 1898; Microschema Warren, 1903

Monotypic genus of geometer moths

Agoschema is a monotypic moth genus in the family Geometridae described by Prout in 1912. Its only species, Agoschema goniata, described by Warren in 1898, is known from New Guinea.
