= Alloeopage =

Scientific classification
- Kingdom: Animalia
- Phylum: Arthropoda
- Clade: Pancrustacea
- Class: Insecta
- Order: Lepidoptera
- Family: Geometridae
- Subfamily: Geometrinae
- Genus: Alloeopage; Prout, 1913

Genus of geometer moths

Alloeopage is a genus of moths in the family Geometridae.

== Species ==
- Alloeopage cinerea (Warren, 1896)
