= Atopodes =

Scientific classification
- Kingdom: Animalia
- Phylum: Arthropoda
- Class: Insecta
- Order: Lepidoptera
- Family: Geometridae
- Subfamily: Ennominae
- Genus: Atopodes; Warren, 1906

Type species
- Atopodes singularis Warren, 1906

Genus of moths

Atopodes is a genus of moths in the family Geometridae. Its type and only species is Atopodes singularis. It is found in Brazil and was first described by William Warren in 1906.
