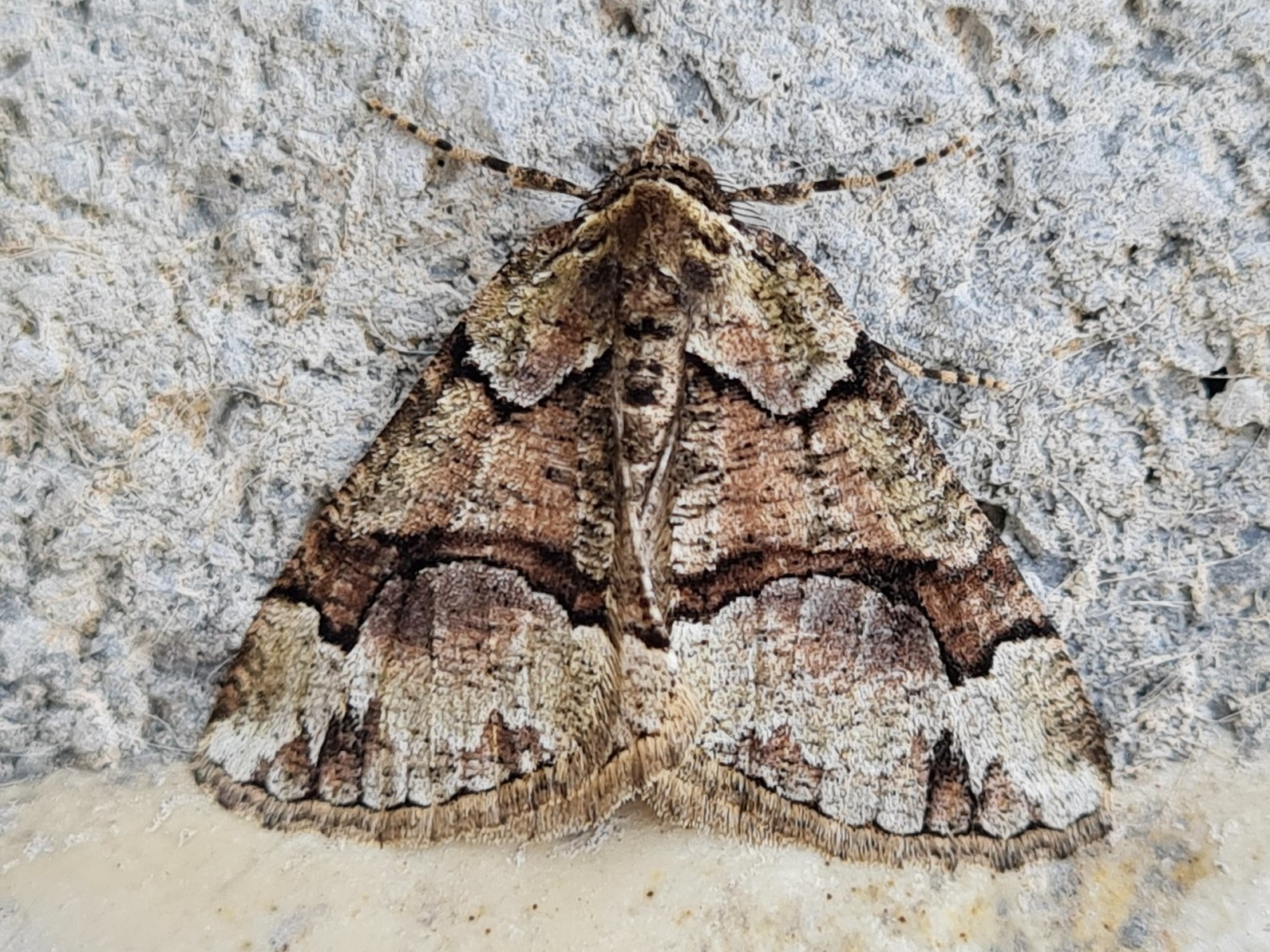

Scientific classification
- Kingdom: Animalia
- Phylum: Arthropoda
- Class: Insecta
- Order: Lepidoptera
- Family: Geometridae
- Genus: Asovia; Alphéraky, 1908
- Species: A. maeoticaria

Binomial name
- Asovia maeoticaria (Alphéraky, 1876)

Synonyms
- (Species): Boarmia decoloraria Alphéraky, 1889; Boarmia maeoticaria Alphéraky, 1876

= Asovia =

Asovia maeoticaria

Genus of moths

Asovia is a genus of moths in the family Geometridae. It is monotypic, being represented by the single species Asovia maeoticaria.
