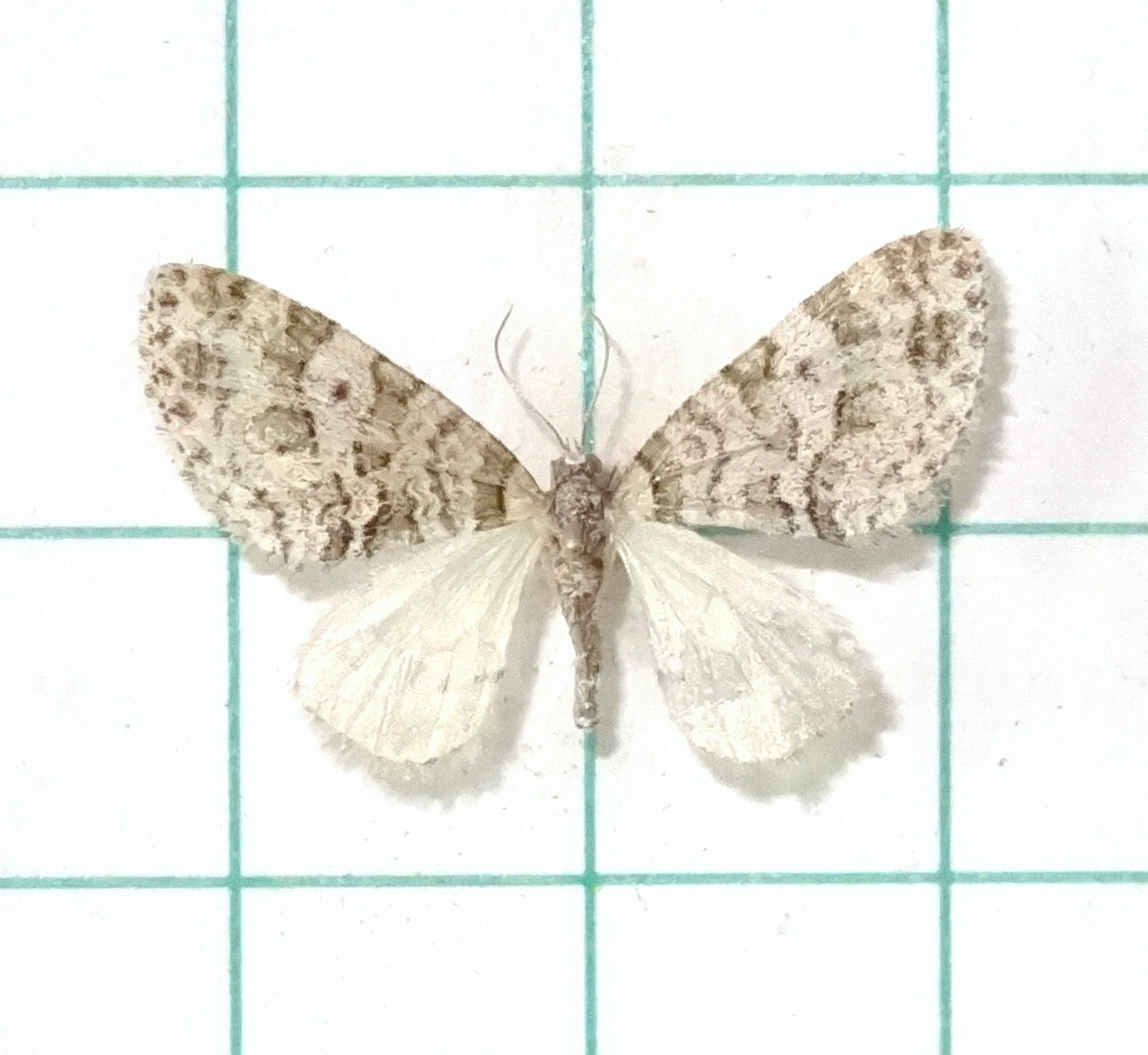
- Archaeocasis micradelpha

Scientific classification
- Kingdom: Animalia
- Phylum: Arthropoda
- Class: Insecta
- Order: Lepidoptera
- Family: Geometridae
- Subfamily: Larentiinae
- Genus: Archaeocasis

= Archaeocasis =

Genus of geometer moths

Archaeocasis is a genus of moths in the family Geometridae. It was first described by Japanese researcher Satoshi Hashimoto.
