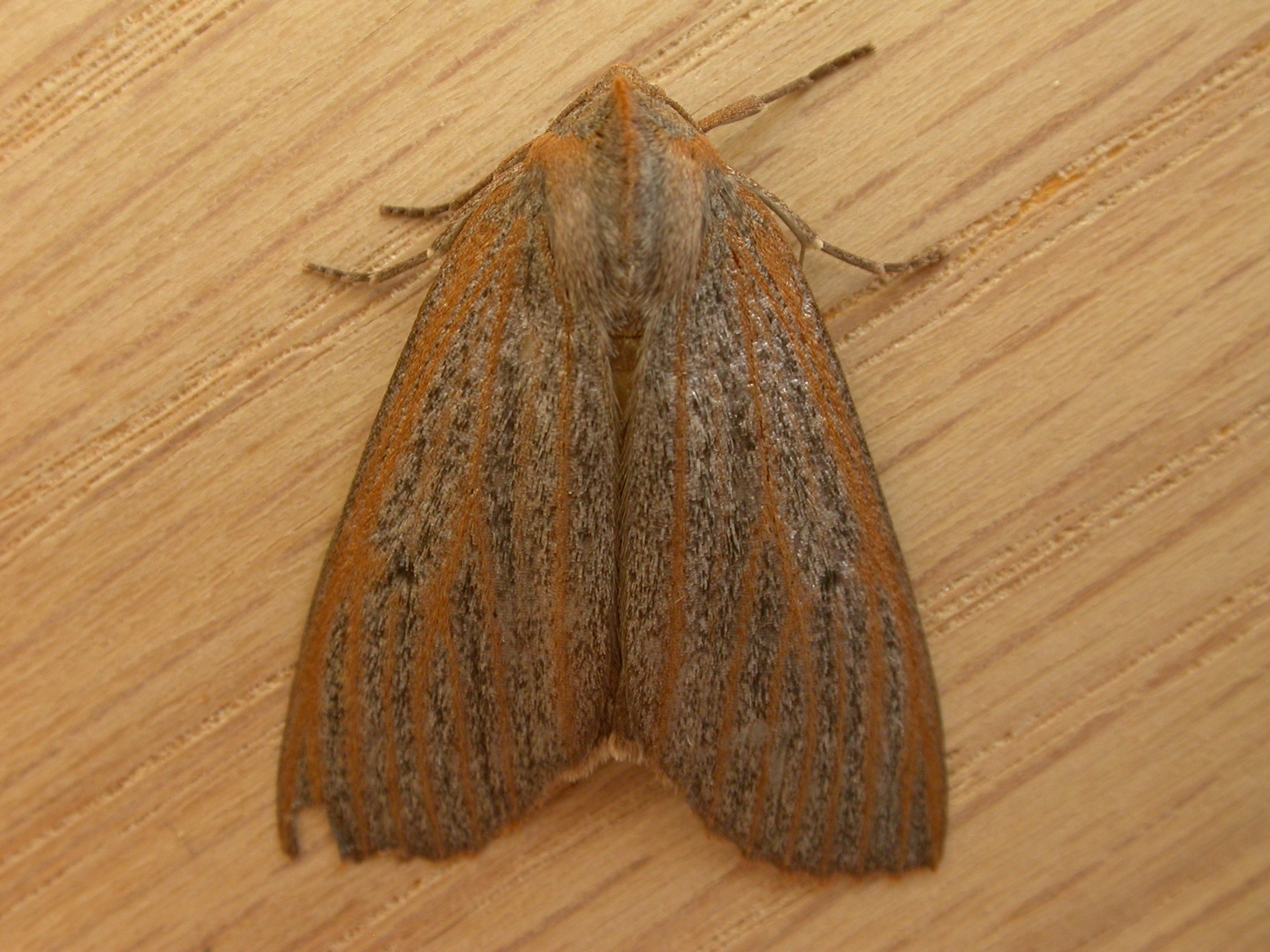
- Paralaea porphyrinaria

Scientific classification
- Kingdom: Animalia
- Phylum: Arthropoda
- Class: Insecta
- Order: Lepidoptera
- Family: Geometridae
- Subfamily: Ennominae
- Genus: Paralaea; Guest, 1887

Synonyms
- Stathmorrhopa Meyrick, 1892; Anochthera Goldfinch, 1944

= Paralaea =

Genus of moths

Paralaea is a genus of moths in the family Geometridae described by Edward Guest in 1887. All the species live in Australia.

== Species ==
- Paralaea ochrosoma (Felder & Rogenhofer, 1875)
- Paralaea beggaria (Guenée, 1857)
- Paralaea porphyrinaria (Guenée, 1857)
- Paralaea polysticha (Goldfinch, 1944)
