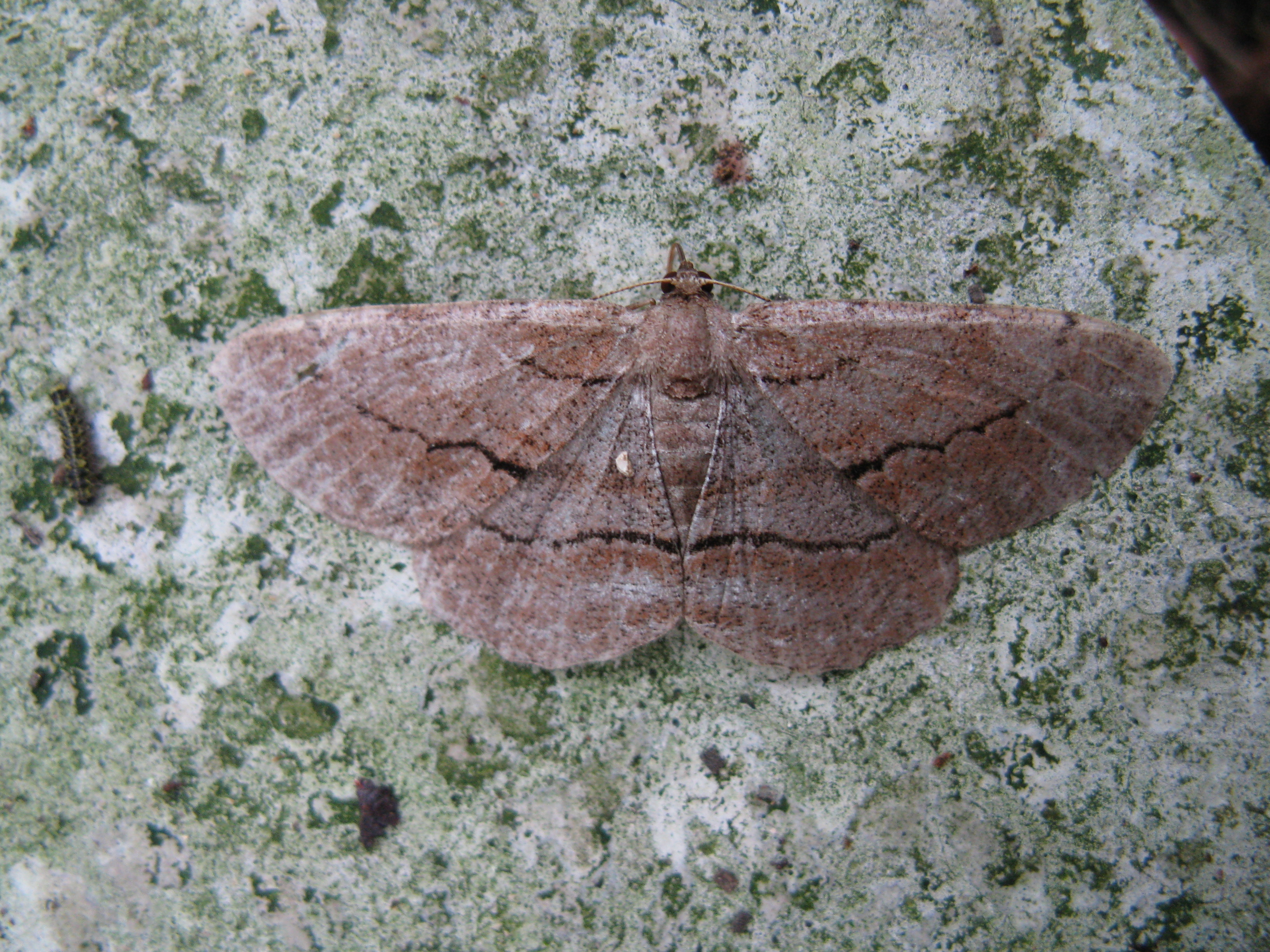
- Apocleora rimosa

Scientific classification
- Kingdom: Animalia
- Phylum: Arthropoda
- Class: Insecta
- Order: Lepidoptera
- Family: Geometridae
- Subfamily: Ennominae
- Genus: Apocleora

= Apocleora =

Genus of geometer moths

Apocleora is a genus of moths in the family Geometridae.

== Species ==
- Apocleora rimosa Butler, 1879 - found in Japan and Korea
