= Apopetelia =

Scientific classification
- Kingdom: Animalia
- Phylum: Arthropoda
- Clade: Pancrustacea
- Class: Insecta
- Order: Lepidoptera
- Family: Geometridae
- Subfamily: Ennominae
- Genus: Apopetelia

Genus of geometer moths

Apopetelia is a genus of moths in the family Geometridae.
