= Almodes =

Scientific classification
- Kingdom: Animalia
- Phylum: Arthropoda
- Class: Insecta
- Order: Lepidoptera
- Family: Geometridae
- Subfamily: Oenochrominae
- Genus: Almodes; Guenée, 1857

Genus of geometer moths

Almodes is a genus of moths in the family Geometridae.

== Species ==
- Almodes carinenta (Cramer, [1777])
- Almodes terraria Guenée, 1857
