= Argyrotome =

Scientific classification
- Kingdom: Animalia
- Phylum: Arthropoda
- Clade: Pancrustacea
- Class: Insecta
- Order: Lepidoptera
- Family: Geometridae
- Subfamily: Ennominae
- Genus: Argyrotome; Warren, 1894

Genus of moths

Argyrotome is a genus of moths in the family Geometridae.

== Species ==
- Argyrotome alba (Druce, 1892)
- Argyrotome arcuata Debauche, 1937
- Argyrotome cyclopea Debauche, 1937
- Argyrotome interrupta (Schaus, 1911)
- Argyrotome maria Matson, 2026
- Argyrotome melae (Druce, 1892)
- Argyrotome metallicata Warren, 1907
- Argyrotome mexicaria Schaus, 1901
- Argyrotome midas Matson, 2026
- Argyrotome mira (Oberthür, 1883)
- Argyrotome muricolor Warren, 1905
- Argyrotome murina Matson, 2026
- Argyrotome noctigoldia Matson, 2026
- Argyrotome pacifica Matson, 2026
- Argyrotome paraguayaria Schaus, 1927
- Argyrotome parva Matson, 2026
- Argyrotome ponderosa Matson, 2026
- Argyrotome prattaria Schaus, 1927
- Argyrotome prospectata (Snellen, 1874)
- Argyrotome subinquinata Dognin, 1914
- Argyrotome tenebrosa Warren, 1897
