= Axiodes =

Scientific classification
- Kingdom: Animalia
- Phylum: Arthropoda
- Class: Insecta
- Order: Lepidoptera
- Family: Geometridae
- Subfamily: Ennominae
- Genus: Axiodes; Warren, 1894

Genus of moths

Axiodes is a genus of moths in the family Geometridae erected by Warren in 1894.

== Species ==
- Axiodes inaequalis Prout, 1915
- Axiodes insciata (Felder & Rogenhofer, 1875)
- Axiodes tripartita Prout, 1915
