= Anomogenes =

- Anomogenes morphnopa, male specimen

Scientific classification
- Kingdom: Animalia
- Phylum: Arthropoda
- Class: Insecta
- Order: Lepidoptera
- Family: Geometridae
- Subfamily: Geometrinae
- Genus: Anomogenes; Turner, 1932
- Species: A. morphnopa

Binomial name
- Anomogenes morphnopa Turner, 1932

Synonyms
- Pseudoterpna bryophanes Turner, 1904

Genus of geometer moths

Anomogenes is a monotypic genus of moths in the Geometrinae subfamily of the Geometridae family of geometer moths. It consists of only the Anomogenes morphnopa species found in Western Queensland, Australia. Alfred Jefferis Turner first described the species in 1932.

== Description ==
The adult wingspan of Anomogenes morphnopa is around 26 mm for males and 34 mm for females. The moths have grey abdomens and brown patches on their triangular forewings. Its inchworm caterpillars tend to feed on finger lime.

== Taxonomy ==
=== Etymology ===
The name Anomogenes comes from the Greek άνομογενης (anomoiogenis), meaning unhomogeneous, or heterogeneous ("alien" as described by Turner). As for morphnopa, its name supposedly comes from the Greek "μορφνωπος" ("morphnopo", "dark" per Turner), likely derivative of μορφόω (morphóō), meaning to shape or form.

== History ==
On August 11, 1932, Dr. Alfred Jefferis Turner, an Australian pediatrician and amateur entomologist, described the genus and its A. morphnopa species in a journal of the Royal Society of South Australia. Turner received larvae from the Queensland Department of Agriculture which he bred two specimens from. Those types were given to the Queensland Museum. In total, Turner described 16 new genera and 54 new species of lepidoptera in the same journal article. He did so with much assistance from his colleague, English entomologist Alice Ellen Prout.
