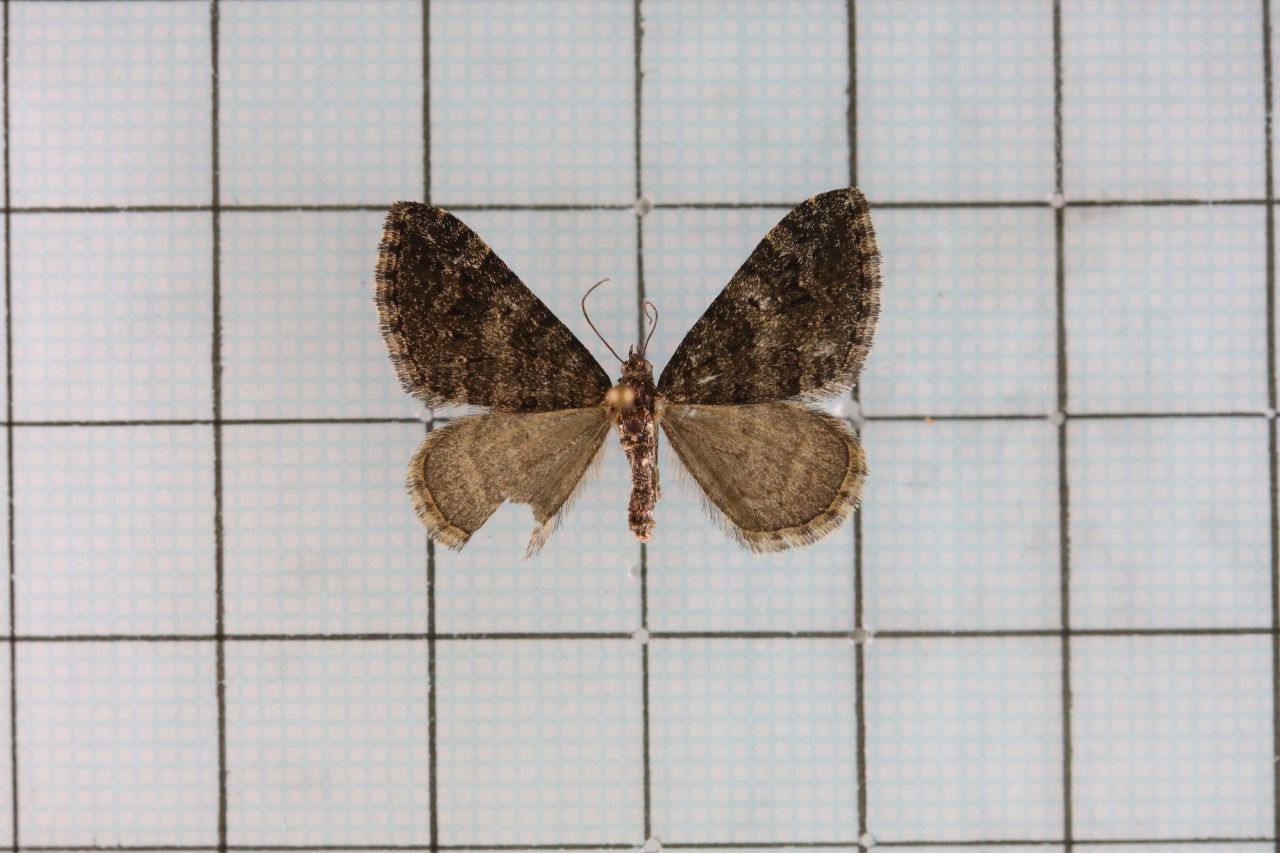
- Atopophysa opulens

Scientific classification
- Kingdom: Animalia
- Phylum: Arthropoda
- Class: Insecta
- Order: Lepidoptera
- Family: Geometridae
- Subfamily: Larentiinae
- Genus: Atopophysa; Warren, 1894

= Atopophysa =

Genus of moths

Atopophysa is a genus of moths in the family Geometridae.

== Species ==
- Atopophysa candidula Inoue, 1986
- Atopophysa indistincta (Butler, 1889)
- Atopophysa lividata (Bastelberger, 1909)
- Atopophysa opulens Prout, 1914
