= Argyrographa =

Scientific classification
- Kingdom: Animalia
- Phylum: Arthropoda
- Clade: Pancrustacea
- Class: Insecta
- Order: Lepidoptera
- Family: Geometridae
- Genus: Argyrographa; Prout, 1912
- Species: A. moderata

Binomial name
- Argyrographa moderata (Walker, 1862)

Genus of moths

Argyrographa is a genus of moths in the family Geometridae. It's a monotypic with its only species being Argyrographa moderata.
