= Aphanophleps =

Scientific classification
- Kingdom: Animalia
- Phylum: Arthropoda
- Class: Insecta
- Order: Lepidoptera
- Family: Geometridae
- Subfamily: Sterrhinae
- Genus: Aphanophleps

Genus of geometer moths

Aphanophleps is a genus of moths in the family Geometridae.

There are four species in the genus Aphanophleps:

- Aphanophleps adaucta
- Aphanophleps rubricolor
- Aphanophleps vinosaria
- Aphanophleps vulpina
