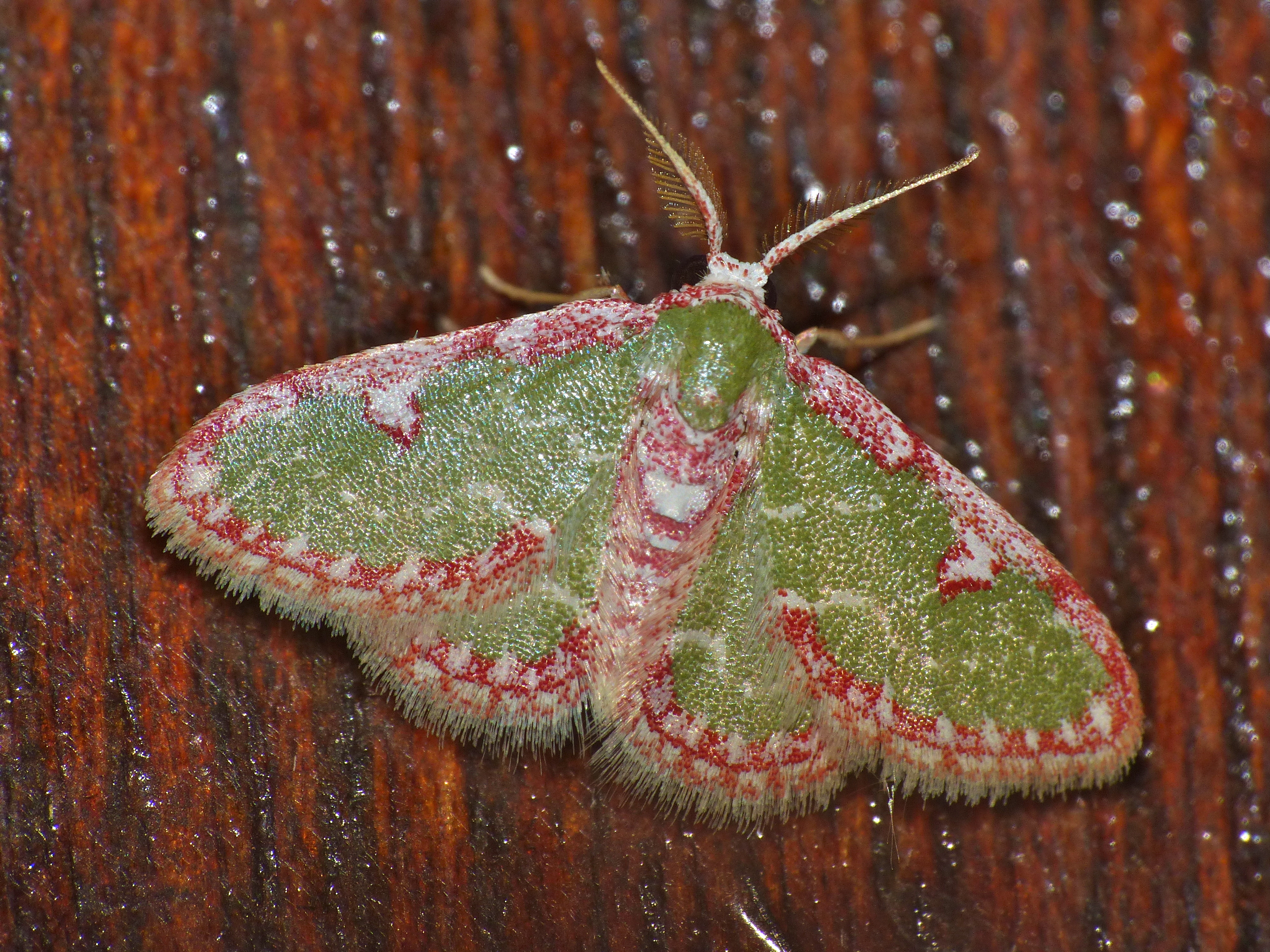
- A. biornata

Scientific classification
- Kingdom: Animalia
- Phylum: Arthropoda
- Clade: Pancrustacea
- Class: Insecta
- Order: Lepidoptera
- Family: Geometridae
- Subfamily: Geometrinae
- Genus: Allochrostes; Prout, 1912

= Allochrostes =

Genus of geometer moths

Allochrostes is a genus of moths in the family Geometridae described by Prout in 1912.

== Species ==
The species include:

- Allochrostes biornata
- Allochrostes imperfecta
- Allochrostes impunctata
- Allochrostes rubridentata
- Allochrostes saliata
- Allochrostes uniornata
