= Anosiodes =

Scientific classification
- Kingdom: Animalia
- Phylum: Arthropoda
- Class: Insecta
- Order: Lepidoptera
- Family: Geometridae
- Subfamily: Ennominae
- Genus: Anosiodes; Warren, 1903

Type species
- Anosiodes hybrida Warren, 1903

Genus of geometer moths

Anosiodes is a genus of moths in the family Geometridae.
