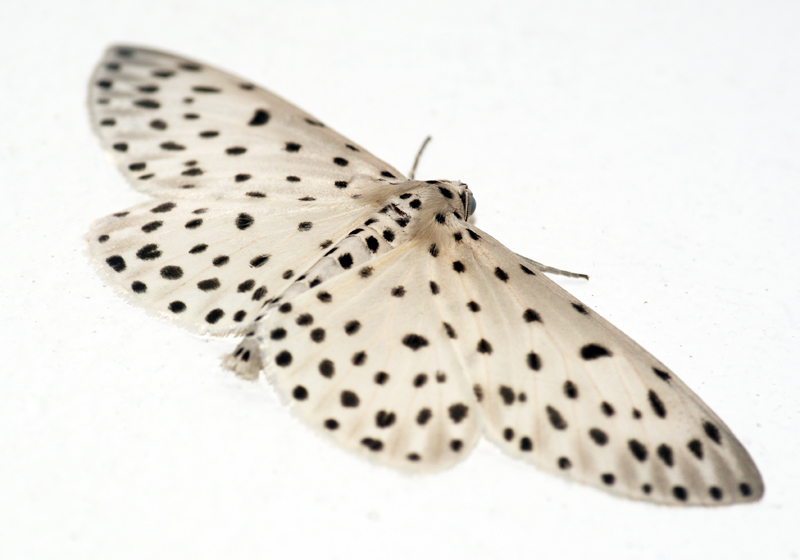

Scientific classification
- Kingdom: Animalia
- Phylum: Arthropoda
- Clade: Pancrustacea
- Class: Insecta
- Order: Lepidoptera
- Family: Geometridae
- Subfamily: Ennominae
- Genus: Antipercnia

= Antipercnia =

Genus of geometer moths

Antipercnia is a genus of moths in the family Geometridae. There are five recorded species in this genus.
