= Allocotesia =

Scientific classification
- Kingdom: Animalia
- Phylum: Arthropoda
- Class: Insecta
- Order: Lepidoptera
- Family: Geometridae
- Subfamily: Geometrinae
- Genus: Allocotesia; Wehrli, 1936
- Species: A. chiphora

Binomial name
- Allocotesia chiphora Wehrli, 1936

Monotypic genus of geometer moths

Allocotesia is a monotypic moth genus in the family Geometridae. Its only species is Allocotesia chiphora. Both the genus and species were described by Wehrli in 1936.
