= Arilophia =

Scientific classification
- Kingdom: Animalia
- Phylum: Arthropoda
- Class: Insecta
- Order: Lepidoptera
- Family: Geometridae
- Subfamily: Ennominae
- Genus: Arilophia; Rindge, 1990

Type species
- Arilophia rawlinsi

Genus of moths

Arilophia is a genus of moths in the family Geometridae found in the Dominican Republic. The type species is Arilophia rawlinsi.
