= Apericallia =

Scientific classification
- Kingdom: Animalia
- Phylum: Arthropoda
- Class: Insecta
- Order: Lepidoptera
- Family: Geometridae
- Subfamily: Ennominae
- Genus: Apericallia

Genus of geometer moths

Apericallia is a genus of moths in the family Geometridae. It was described by John Henry Leech in 1897 from seven species collected in western China in Moupin. The type species is Apericallia bilinearia.
