= Acidromodes =

Scientific classification
- Kingdom: Animalia
- Phylum: Arthropoda
- Clade: Pancrustacea
- Class: Insecta
- Order: Lepidoptera
- Family: Geometridae
- Tribe: Microloxiini
- Genus: Acidromodes; Hausmann, 1999

Genus of geometer moths

Acidromodes is a genus of moths in the family Geometridae.

== Species ==
Acidromodes contains the following species:

- Acidromodes muelleri Hausmann, 1999
- Acidromodes nilotica (Wiltshire, 1985) - type species (as Acidaliastis nilotica); and the following subspecies:
  - Acidromodes nilotica legraini Hausmann, 1999
- Acidromodes porphyretica (L. B. Prout, 1925)
- Acidromodes saharae (Wiltshire, 1985)
