= Arctoscelia =

Scientific classification
- Kingdom: Animalia
- Phylum: Arthropoda
- Class: Insecta
- Order: Lepidoptera
- Family: Geometridae
- Subfamily: Ennominae
- Genus: Arctoscelia; Warren, 1897

Genus of moths

Arctoscelia is a genus of moths in the family Geometridae.

== Species ==
- Arctoscelia onusta Warren, 1897
