= Arizela =

Scientific classification
- Kingdom: Animalia
- Phylum: Arthropoda
- Clade: Pancrustacea
- Class: Insecta
- Order: Lepidoptera
- Superfamily: Geometroidea
- Family: Geometridae
- Subfamily: Ennominae
- Genus: Arizela; Prout, 1910

Type species
- Arizela dulcis Prout, 1910

Species
- Arizela dulcis Prout, 1910; Arizela tensata (Felder & Rogenhofer, 1875)

Genus of moths

Arizela is a genus of moths in the family Geometridae, subfamily Ennominae. It was first described by Louis Beethoven Prout in 1910.

== Species ==
Two species are currently recognized in the genus:

- Arizela dulcis Prout, 1910 – type species
- Arizela tensata (Felder & Rogenhofer, 1875)

== Description ==
Arizela moths are medium-sized with broad, flat wings typically marked with wavy or mottled lines. Males have bipectinate antennae and often possess hindleg scent tufts used in courtship. Adults rest with wings outspread and have abdominal tympanal organs to detect bat echolocation.

== Distribution ==
Arizela species are native to southern South America. A. dulcis is known from central Argentina, particularly San Luis Province, while A. tensata has been recorded in southern Chile, notably Valdivia.

== Biology ==
Specific biological details for Arizela are limited, but like other geometrids, the larvae are likely twig-mimicking inchworms that feed on foliage. Adults are nocturnal and attracted to light. Mating behaviors likely involve male scent tufts and female pheromones. Life cycles likely include pupation in soil or leaf litter.
