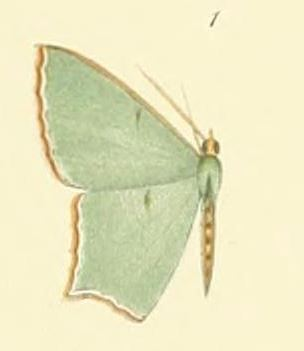

Scientific classification
- Kingdom: Animalia
- Phylum: Arthropoda
- Class: Insecta
- Order: Lepidoptera
- Family: Geometridae
- Subfamily: Geometrinae
- Genus: Antharmostes; Warren, 1899

Type species
- Antharmostes mesoleuca Warren, 1899

= Antharmostes =

Genus of geometer moths

Antharmostes is a genus of moths in the family Geometridae first described by Warren in 1899.

== Species ==
Some species of this genus are:

- Antharmostes alcaea L. B. Prout, 1930
- Antharmostes dargei Herbulot, 1982
- Antharmostes interalbicans Warren, 1902
- Antharmostes marginata (Warren, 1897)
- Antharmostes mesoleuca Warren, 1899
- Antharmostes orinophragma Prout, 1930
- Antharmostes papilio Prout, 1912
- Antharmostes reducta Herbulot, 1996
- Antharmostes simplicimargo Prout, 1917
- Antharmostes sufflata Herbulot, 1982
- Antharmostes tutsiana Herbulot, 1996
