= Asthenophleps =

Scientific classification
- Kingdom: Animalia
- Phylum: Arthropoda
- Clade: Pancrustacea
- Class: Insecta
- Order: Lepidoptera
- Family: Geometridae
- Subfamily: Ennominae
- Genus: Asthenophleps; Prout, 1916

Type species
- Asthenophleps strigulata Prout, 1916

Genus of moths

Asthenophleps is a monotypic genus of moths in the family Geometridae. The type and only species in this genus is Asthenophleps strigulata, found in Central Dutch New Guinea. They were described by Louis Beethoven Prout in 1916.
