= Anoectomychus =

Scientific classification
- Kingdom: Animalia
- Phylum: Arthropoda
- Clade: Pancrustacea
- Class: Insecta
- Order: Lepidoptera
- Family: Geometridae
- Subfamily: Ennominae
- Genus: Anoectomychus; Prout, 1915
- Species: A. pudens

Binomial name
- Anoectomychus pudens (Swinhoe, 1904)

Monotypic genus of geometer moths

Anoectomychus is a monotypic moth genus in the family Geometridae described by Prout in 1915. Its single species, Anoectomychus pudens, described by Swinhoe in 1904, is found in Nigeria.
