= Anemmetresa =

Scientific classification
- Kingdom: Animalia
- Phylum: Arthropoda
- Class: Insecta
- Order: Lepidoptera
- Family: Geometridae
- Genus: Anemmetresa
- Species: A. flavimacularia

Binomial name
- Anemmetresa flavimacularia Leech, 1897

Genus of geometer moths

Anemmetresa is a monotypic genus of moths in the family Geometridae. It contains only one species, Anemmetresa flavimacularia.
