= Acrobiston =

Scientific classification
- Kingdom: Animalia
- Phylum: Arthropoda
- Class: Insecta
- Order: Lepidoptera
- Family: Geometridae
- Subfamily: Geometrinae
- Genus: Acrobiston; Wiltshire, 1967

Genus of geometer moths

Acrobiston is a genus of moths in the family Geometridae.

== Species ==
- Acrobiston aestivalis Wiltshire, 1967
