= Anticypella =

Scientific classification
- Kingdom: Animalia
- Phylum: Arthropoda
- Class: Insecta
- Order: Lepidoptera
- Family: Geometridae
- Subfamily: Ennominae
- Genus: Anticypella; Meyrick, 1892

Genus of geometer moths

Anticypella is a genus of moths in the family Geometridae.

== Species ==
- Anticypella diffusaria (leech, 1897)
