= Astegania =

Scientific classification
- Kingdom: Animalia
- Phylum: Arthropoda
- Class: Insecta
- Order: Lepidoptera
- Family: Geometridae
- Tribe: Caberini
- Genus: Astegania; Djakonov, 1936

Genus of moths

Astegania is a genus of moths in the family Geometridae.

== Species ==
- Astegania honesta (Prout, 1908)
