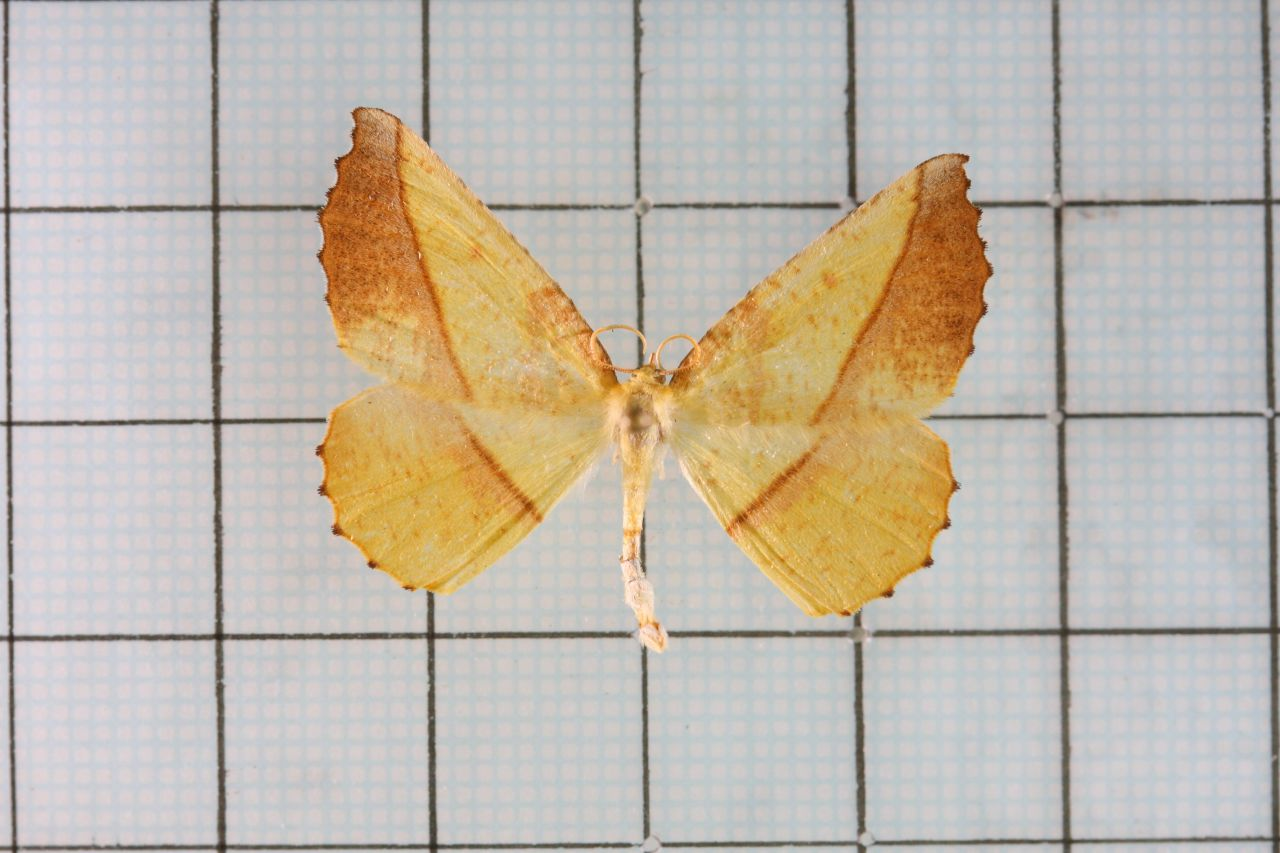
- Auaxa cesadaria

Scientific classification
- Kingdom: Animalia
- Phylum: Arthropoda
- Class: Insecta
- Order: Lepidoptera
- Family: Geometridae
- Subfamily: Ennominae
- Genus: Auaxa; Walker, 1860

= Auaxa =

Genus of moths

Auaxa is a genus of moths in the family Geometridae. The genus was first described by Walker in 1860 with the type species Auaxa cesadaria from China.

== Species ==
- Auaxa cesadaria Walker, 1860
- Auaxa kaluga Swinhoe 1900
- Auaxa lanceolata Inoue 1992
- Auaxa mimosina Inoue, 1992
- Auaxa sulphurea (Butler 1878)
