= Abraxesis =

Scientific classification
- Kingdom: Animalia
- Phylum: Arthropoda
- Class: Insecta
- Order: Lepidoptera
- Family: Geometridae
- Subfamily: Ennominae
- Genus: Abraxesis; Hampson, 1902
- Species: A. melaleucaria

Binomial name
- Abraxesis melaleucaria Hampson, 1902

Monotypic genus of geometer moths

Abraxesis is a monotypic moth genus in the family Geometridae. Its single species, Abraxesis melaleucaria, was described from Shimla, India. Both the genus and species were first described by George Hampson in 1902.
