= Allochlorodes =

Scientific classification
- Kingdom: Animalia
- Phylum: Arthropoda
- Clade: Pancrustacea
- Class: Insecta
- Order: Lepidoptera
- Family: Geometridae
- Genus: Allochlorodes; Prout, 1917
- Species: A. elpis

Binomial name
- Allochlorodes elpis Prout, 1917

Genus of geometer moths

Allochlorodes is a monotypic genus of moths in the family Geometridae, with Allochlorodes elpis as its sole species. Both genus and species were described in 1917 by Louis Beethoven Prout. The species occurs in South Africa.
