= Anchiphyllia =

Scientific classification
- Kingdom: Animalia
- Phylum: Arthropoda
- Class: Insecta
- Order: Lepidoptera
- Family: Geometridae
- Subfamily: Larentiinae
- Genus: Anchiphyllia; Butler, 1893

Genus of geometer moths

Anchiphyllia is a genus of moths in the family Geometridae erected by Arthur Gardiner Butler in 1893. It is considered by Luis E. Parra and Carla A. Alvear to be a synonym of Ennada.

== Species ==
- Anchiphyllia olivacena (Butler, 1882)
