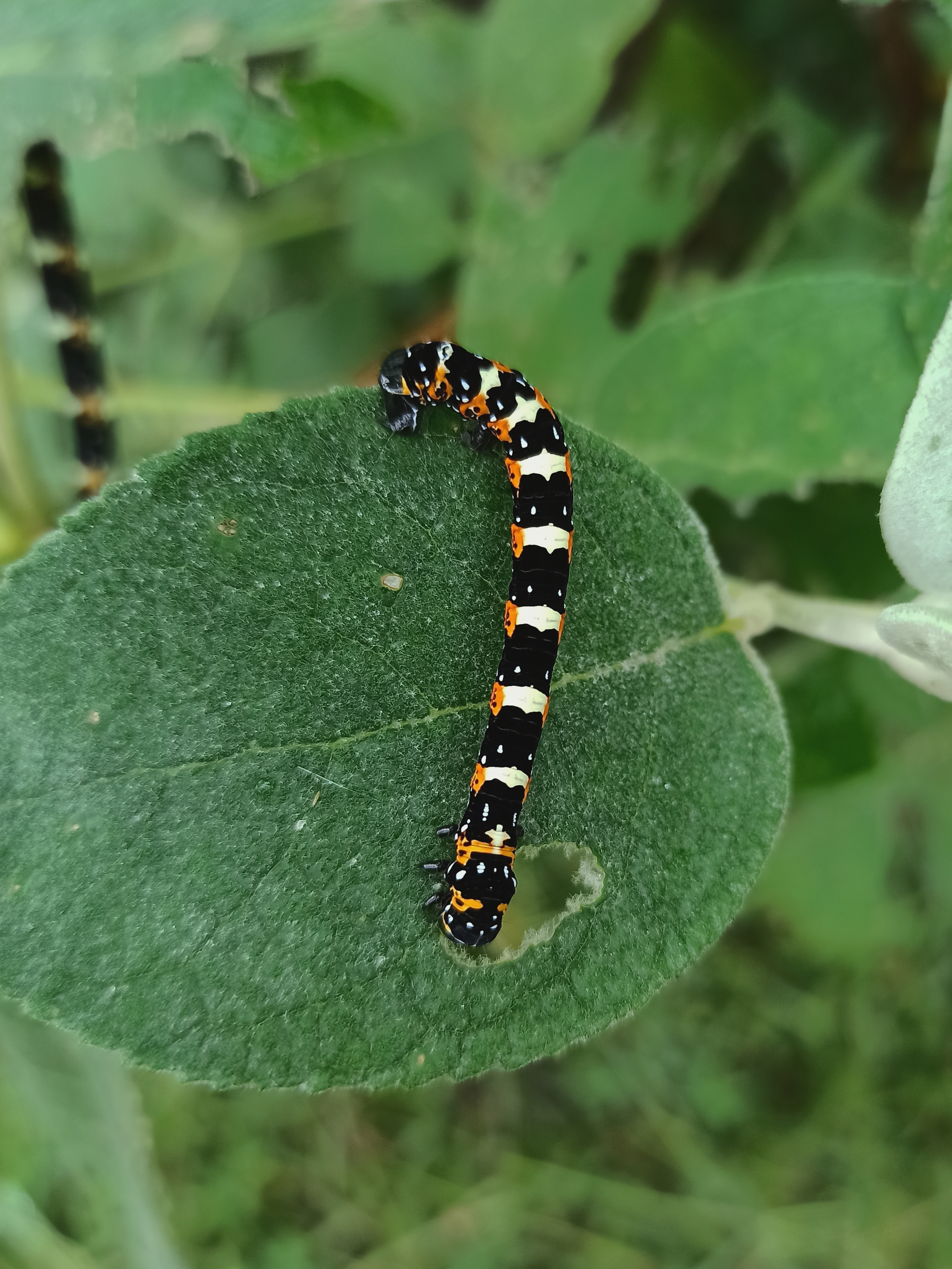
- Acronyctodes leonilaria caterpillar

Scientific classification
- Kingdom: Animalia
- Phylum: Arthropoda
- Class: Insecta
- Order: Lepidoptera
- Family: Geometridae
- Subfamily: Geometrinae
- Genus: Acronyctodes; H. Edwards, 1884

= Acronyctodes =

Genus of geometer moths

Acronyctodes is a genus of moths in the family Geometridae first described by Henry Edwards in 1884.

== Species ==
- Acronyctodes cautama (Schaus, 1901)
- Acronyctodes colorata (Warren, 1901)
- Acronyctodes insignita H. Edwards, 1884
- Acronyctodes leonilaria (Hoffmann, 1936)
- Acronyctodes mexicanaria (Walker, 1860)
- Acronyctodes thinballa (Dyar, 1916)
