= Acauro =

Scientific classification
- Kingdom: Animalia
- Phylum: Arthropoda
- Clade: Pancrustacea
- Class: Insecta
- Order: Lepidoptera
- Family: Geometridae
- Genus: Acauro; Rindge, 1986
- Species: A. rotundus

Binomial name
- Acauro rotundus Rindge, 1986

Monotypic genus of geometer moths

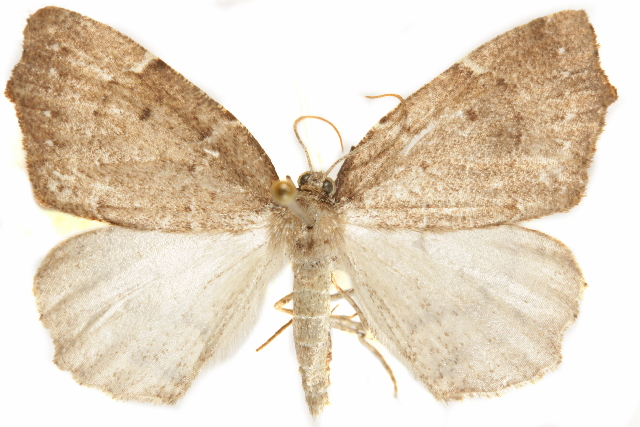
Specimen of Acauro

Acauro is a monotypic genus of moths in the family Geometridae, containing only the species Acauro rotundus. Both were first described in 1986 by Frederick H. Rindge. It is known from central and southern Chile, at altitudes between 400 and 700 meters.
