= Antarchia =

Scientific classification
- Kingdom: Animalia
- Phylum: Arthropoda
- Class: Insecta
- Order: Lepidoptera
- Family: Geometridae
- Subfamily: Ennominae
- Genus: Antarchia

Genus of geometer moths

Antarchia is a genus of moths in the family Geometridae. It was first described by William Warren in 1903.
