= Alloharpina =

Scientific classification
- Kingdom: Animalia
- Phylum: Arthropoda
- Class: Insecta
- Order: Lepidoptera
- Family: Geometridae
- Subfamily: Geometrinae
- Genus: Alloharpina; Wehrli, 1941

Genus of geometer moths

Alloharpina is a genus of moths in the family Geometridae. The genus was described by Wehrli in 1941.

== Species ==
- Alloharpina dolosaria Leech
- Alloharpina conjungens Alphéraky, 1892
- Alloharpina dejeani Oberthür, 1884
- Alloharpina discoidalis Wehrli, 1941
- Alloharpina percostata Wehrli, 1939
