= Anonychia (moth) =

Scientific classification
- Kingdom: Animalia
- Phylum: Arthropoda
- Class: Insecta
- Order: Lepidoptera
- Family: Geometridae
- Subfamily: Ennominae
- Genus: Anonychia; Warren, 1893

Genus of geometer moths

Anonychia is a genus of moths in the family Geometridae described by William Warren in 1893 with type species Anonychia grisea. The genus was described using Nadagara grisea described by Arthur Gardiner Butler and genus Onychia described by Jacob Hübner and two more species added by Frederic Moore i.e. Anonychia lativitta and Anonychia violacea along with his Anonychia rostrifera. The name Anonychia is slightly altered from original Onychia by Hübner and Moore.

== Species ==
- Anonychia antangulata Wehrli, 1939
- Anonychia apora Wehrli, 1937
- Anonychia diversilinea Warren, 1897
- Anonychia fuliginea Wehrli, 1954
- Anonychia grisea Butler, 1883
- Anonychia latifascia Leech, 1897
- Anonychia latifasciaria Leech, 1897
- Anonychia lativitta Moore, 1888
- Anonychia pallida Warren, 1897
- Anonychia psara Wehrli, 1937
- Anonychia rhabdota Wehrli, 1937
- Anonychia rostrifera Warren, 1888
- Anonychia strebla Prout, 1926
- Anonychia trifasciata Hampson, 1902
- Anonychia trinasuta Wehrli, 1937
- Anonychia violacea Moore, 1888
