= Allaxitheca =

Scientific classification
- Kingdom: Animalia
- Phylum: Arthropoda
- Class: Insecta
- Order: Lepidoptera
- Family: Geometridae
- Subfamily: Geometrinae
- Genus: Allaxitheca; Warren, 1897
- Species: A. purpurascens

Binomial name
- Allaxitheca purpurascens Moore, 1888

Monotypic genus of geometer moths

Allaxitheca is a monotypic moth genus in the family Geometridae described by Warren in 1897. Its only species, Allaxitheca purpurascens, was first described by Frederic Moore in 1888.
