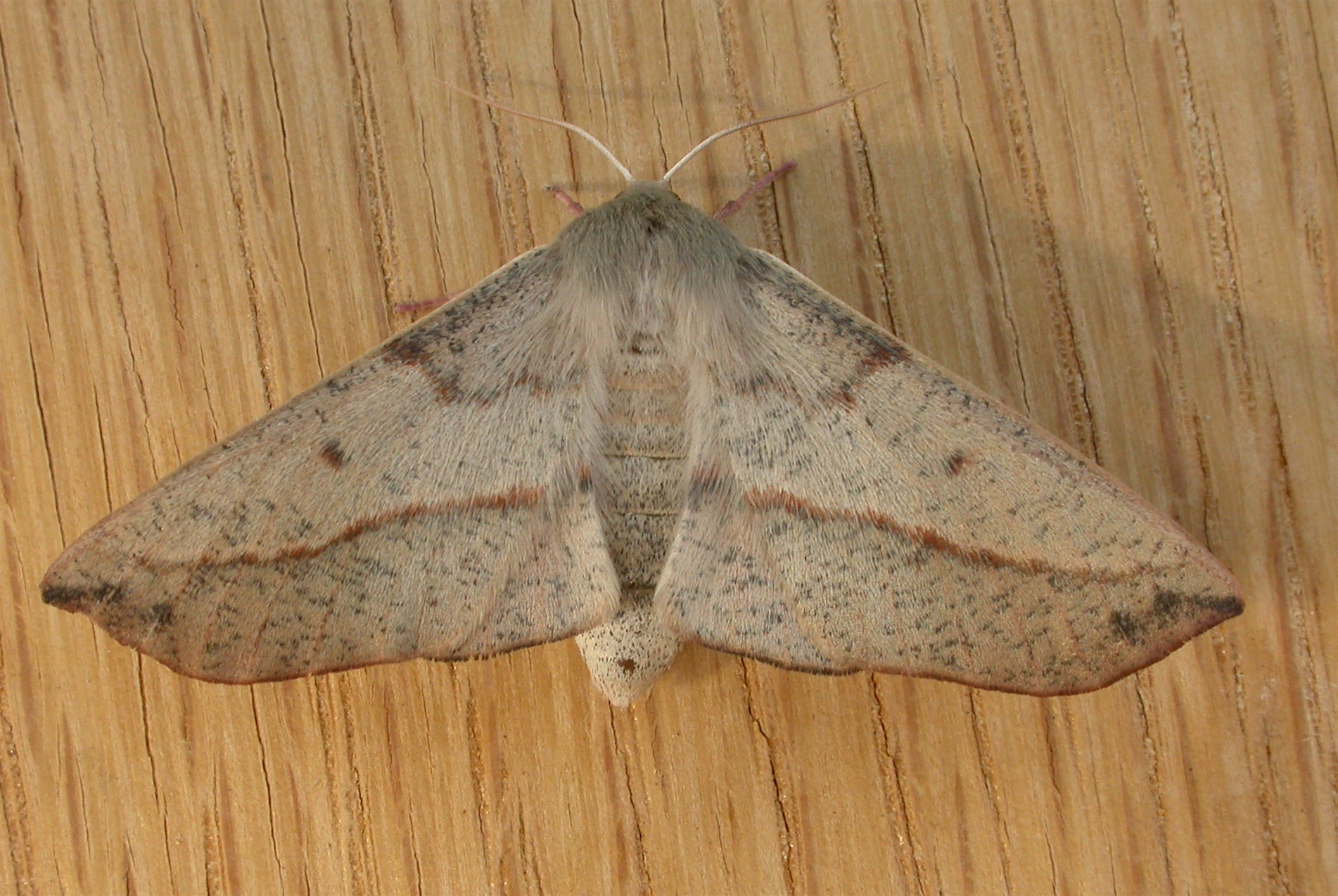
- Antictenia punctunculus (T.P. Lucas, 1892)

Scientific classification
- Kingdom: Animalia
- Phylum: Arthropoda
- Clade: Pancrustacea
- Class: Insecta
- Order: Lepidoptera
- Family: Geometridae
- Subfamily: Oenochrominae
- Genus: Antictenia; Prout, 1910

= Antictenia =

Genus of geometer moths

Antictenia is a genus of moths in the family Geometridae.

== Species ==
- Antictenia punctunculus (Lucas, 1892)
- Antictenia torta Prout, 1921
