= Aoshachia =

Scientific classification
- Kingdom: Animalia
- Phylum: Arthropoda
- Class: Insecta
- Order: Lepidoptera
- Family: Geometridae
- Subfamily: Ennominae
- Genus: Aoshachia

Genus of geometer moths

Aoshachia is a genus of moths in the family Geometridae. It contains the following species:

- Aoshachia amabilis Yazaki, 1988
- Aoshachia rufistriga Kiriakoff, 1963
- Aoshachia virescens Marumo, 1920

A. virescens (yellow ruler moth) was, according to Sato, R. & T. Fukuda. 2014, later described as Doratoptera virescens.
