= Acodia =

Scientific classification
- Kingdom: Animalia
- Phylum: Arthropoda
- Class: Insecta
- Order: Lepidoptera
- Family: Geometridae
- Tribe: Xanthorhoini
- Genus: Acodia; Rosenstock, 1885

Synonyms
- Aprosdoceta Turner, 1926

Genus of geometer moths

Acodia is a genus of moths in the family Geometridae erected by Rudolph Rosenstock in 1885.

== Species ==
- Acodia chytrodes (Turner, 1926)
- Acodia orina (Turner, 1926)
- Acodia pauper Rosenstock, 1885
