= Acrotomia =

Scientific classification
- Kingdom: Animalia
- Phylum: Arthropoda
- Class: Insecta
- Order: Lepidoptera
- Family: Geometridae
- Subfamily: Geometrinae
- Genus: Acrotomia; Herrich-Schäffer, [1855]

Genus of geometer moths

Acrotomia is a genus of moths in the family Geometridae erected by Gottlieb August Wilhelm Herrich-Schäffer in 1855.

== Species ==
- Acrotomia muta Druce, 1892
- Acrotomia trilva Schaus, 1901
- Acrotomia viminaria Herrich-Schäffer, [1855]
