= Anthemoctena =

Scientific classification
- Kingdom: Animalia
- Phylum: Arthropoda
- Class: Insecta
- Order: Lepidoptera
- Family: Geometridae
- Genus: Anthemoctena; Warren, 1895
- Species: A. lineata

Binomial name
- Anthemoctena lineata Warren, 1895

Monotypic genus of geometer moths

Anthemoctena is a monotypic moth genus in the family Geometridae. Its only species, Anthemoctena lineata, is found in South Africa. Both the genus and species were described by Warren in 1895.
