= Altrivalvina =

Scientific classification
- Kingdom: Animalia
- Phylum: Arthropoda
- Class: Insecta
- Order: Lepidoptera
- Family: Geometridae
- Subfamily: Geometrinae
- Genus: Altrivalvina; Wehrli, 1939
- Species: A. magnifica

Binomial name
- Altrivalvina magnifica Wehrli, 1939

Monotypic genus of geometer moths

Altrivalvina is a genus of moths in the family Geometridae. Its only species, Altrivalvina magnifica, was described from Yunnan, China. Both the genus and species were described by Wehrli in 1939.
