= Animomyia =

Scientific classification
- Kingdom: Animalia
- Phylum: Arthropoda
- Clade: Pancrustacea
- Class: Insecta
- Order: Lepidoptera
- Family: Geometridae
- Tribe: Nacophorini
- Genus: Animomyia; Dyar, 1908

Genus of geometer moths

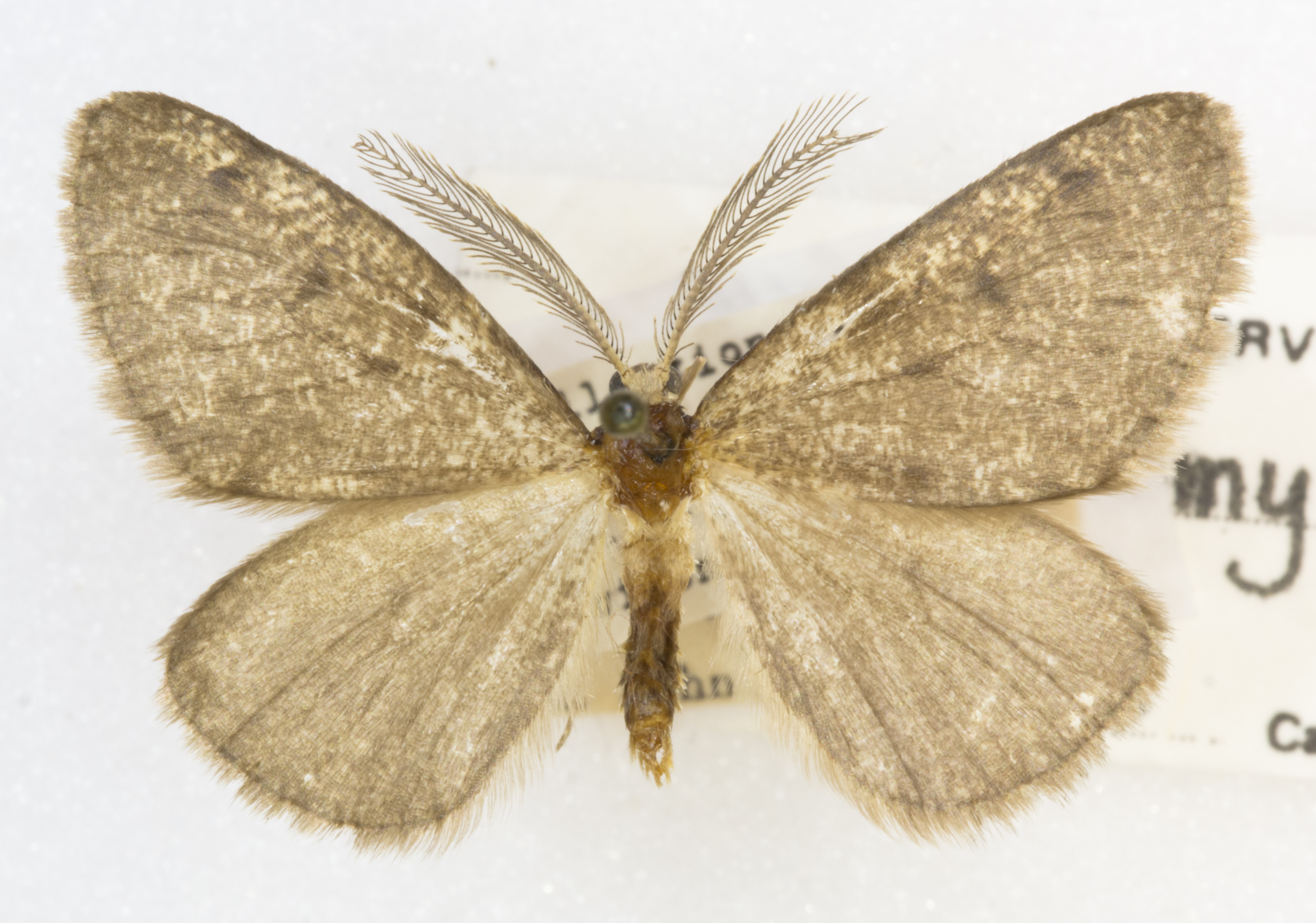
Animomyia smithii, Providence Mountains, California

Animomyia is a genus of moths in the family Geometridae erected by Harrison Gray Dyar Jr. in 1908.

== Species ==
- Animomyia dilatata Rindge, 1974
- Animomyia hardwicki Rindge, 1974
- Animomyia minuta Rindge, 1974
- Animomyia morta Dyar, 1908
- Animomyia nuda Rindge, 1974
- Animomyia smithii (Pearsall, 1910)
- Animomyia turgida Rindge, 1974
