= Archiplutodes =

Scientific classification
- Kingdom: Animalia
- Phylum: Arthropoda
- Class: Insecta
- Order: Lepidoptera
- Family: Geometridae
- Tribe: Plutodini
- Genus: Archiplutodes; Warren, 1894

Genus of moths

Archiplutodes is a genus of moths in the family Geometridae.

== Species ==
- Archiplutodes prasina (Swinhoe, 1892)
