= Apocolotois =

Scientific classification
- Kingdom: Animalia
- Phylum: Arthropoda
- Class: Insecta
- Order: Lepidoptera
- Family: Geometridae
- Tribe: Colotoini
- Genus: Apocolotois; Wehrli, 1936

Genus of geometer moths

Apocolotois is a genus of moths in the family Geometridae described by Wehrli in 1936.

== Species ==
- Apocolotois almatensis Djakonov, 1952
- Apocolotois arnoldiaria (Oberthür, 1912)
- Apocolotois smirnovi Romanoff, 1885
