= Aventiopsis =

Scientific classification
- Kingdom: Animalia
- Phylum: Arthropoda
- Class: Insecta
- Order: Lepidoptera
- Family: Geometridae
- Subfamily: Ennominae
- Genus: Aventiopsis

Genus of moths

Aventiopsis is a genus of moths in the family Geometridae. They have been collected in Costa Rica, Ecuador, Peru, Brazil, and French Guiana.
