= Acollesis =

Scientific classification
- Kingdom: Animalia
- Phylum: Arthropoda
- Class: Insecta
- Order: Lepidoptera
- Family: Geometridae
- Subfamily: Geometrinae
- Genus: Acollesis; Warren, 1898

Species
- See text.

Genus of geometer moths

Acollesis is a genus of moths in the family Geometridae.

== Species ==
- Acollesis fraudulenta Warren, 1898
- Acollesis mimetica Prout, 1915
- Acollesis oxychora Prout, 1930
- Acollesis terminata Prout, 1912
- Acollesis umbrata Warren, 1899
