= Aracima =

Scientific classification
- Kingdom: Animalia
- Phylum: Arthropoda
- Class: Insecta
- Order: Lepidoptera
- Family: Geometridae
- Subfamily: Geometrinae
- Genus: Aracima; Butler, 1878
- Species: A. muscosa

Binomial name
- Aracima muscosa Butler, 1878

Monotypic genus of geometer moths

Aracima is a monotypic moth genus in the family Geometridae. Its only species, Aracima muscosa, is found in Primorye, Amur, Sakhalin, China, Korea and Japan. Both the genus and species were first described by Arthur Gardiner Butler in 1878.
