= Aenictes =

Scientific classification
- Kingdom: Animalia
- Phylum: Arthropoda
- Class: Insecta
- Order: Lepidoptera
- Family: Geometridae
- Subfamily: Geometrinae
- Genus: Aenictes; Warren, 1895

Genus of geometer moths

Aenictes is a genus of moths in the family Geometridae described by Warren in 1895.

== Species ==
- Aenictes basivirida Schaus, 1901
- Aenictes muscivaria Warren, 1904
- Aenictes polygrapharia Herrich-Schäffer, [1855]
- Aenictes sororcula Warren, 1904
