= Acrostatheusis =

Scientific classification
- Kingdom: Animalia
- Phylum: Arthropoda
- Clade: Pancrustacea
- Class: Insecta
- Order: Lepidoptera
- Family: Geometridae
- Subfamily: Geometrinae
- Genus: Acrostatheusis; Prout, 1915

Genus of geometer moths

Acrostatheusis is a genus of moths in the family Geometridae.

== Species ==
- Acrostatheusis apicitincta Prout, 1915
