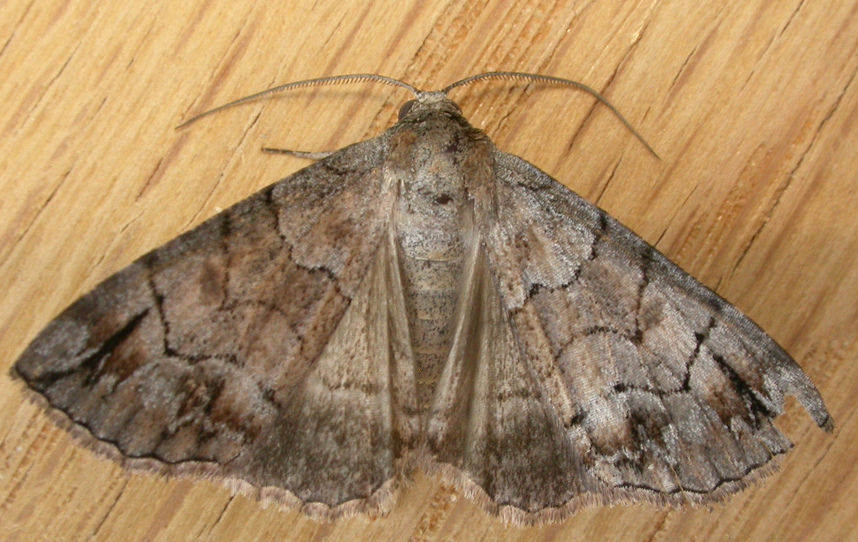
- Dysbatus stenodesma

Scientific classification
- Domain: Eukaryota
- Kingdom: Animalia
- Phylum: Arthropoda
- Class: Insecta
- Order: Lepidoptera
- Family: Geometridae
- Tribe: Nacophorini
- Genus: Dysbatus; Butler, 1886

= Dysbatus =

Genus of moths

Dysbatus is a genus of moths in the family Geometridae.

== Species ==
- Dysbatus singularis Butler, 1886
- Dysbatus stenodesma (Lower, 1899)
