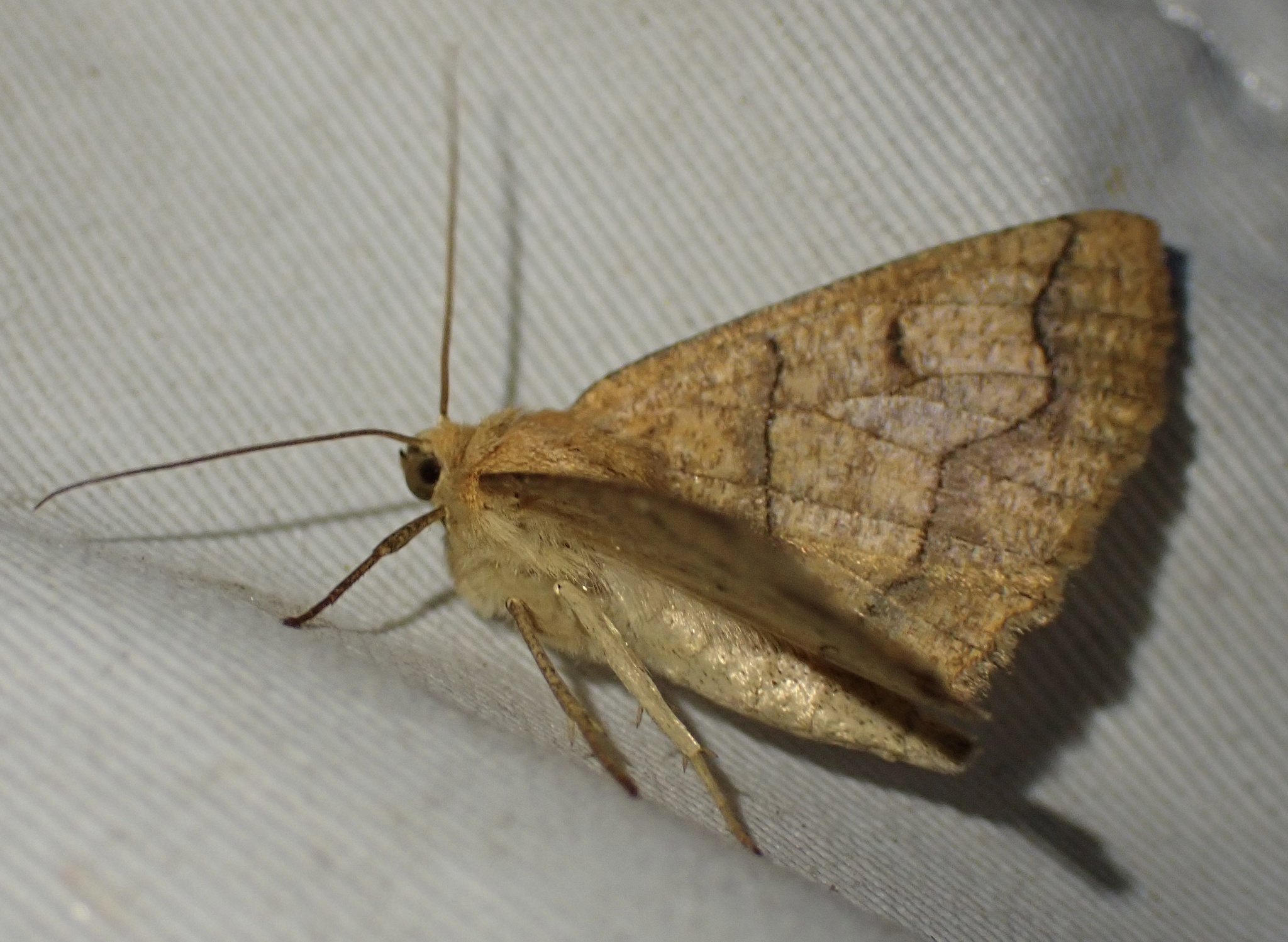
- Photo of Anisoperas cervinicolor

Scientific classification
- Kingdom: Animalia
- Phylum: Arthropoda
- Class: Insecta
- Order: Lepidoptera
- Family: Geometridae
- Subfamily: Ennominae
- Genus: Anisoperas; Warren,1895

= Anisoperas =

Genus of geometer moths

Anisoperas is a genus of moths in the Geometridae family.
