= Apiciopsis =

Scientific classification
- Kingdom: Animalia
- Phylum: Arthropoda
- Class: Insecta
- Order: Lepidoptera
- Family: Geometridae
- Subfamily: Ennominae
- Genus: Apiciopsis

Genus of geometer moths

Apiciopsis is a genus of moths in the family Geometridae. Its type species is Apiciopsis obliquaria.
