= Adicocrita =

Scientific classification
- Kingdom: Animalia
- Phylum: Arthropoda
- Clade: Pancrustacea
- Class: Insecta
- Order: Lepidoptera
- Family: Geometridae
- Subfamily: Geometrinae
- Genus: Adicocrita; Prout, 1930

Genus of geometer moths

Adicocrita is a genus of moths in the family Geometridae described by Prout in 1930.

== Species ==
- Adicocrita araria Guenée, [1858] (type species as Racheospila araria Guenée, 1857)
- Adicocrita discerpta Walker, F., 1861
- Adicocrita koranata Felder & Rogenhofer, 1875
- Adicocrita aciculata Herbulot, 1983
