= Achlora =

Scientific classification
- Kingdom: Animalia
- Phylum: Arthropoda
- Class: Insecta
- Order: Lepidoptera
- Family: Geometridae
- Genus: Achlora; Guenée in Boisduval & Guenée, 1857
- Species: A. cuprearia

Binomial name
- Achlora cuprearia Guenée, 1857

Monotypic genus of geometer moths

Achlora is a monotypic moth genus in the family Geometridae erected by Achille Guenée in 1857. The single species in the genus is Achlora cuprearia, described by the same author in the same year.

It is considered by The Global Lepidoptera Names Index to be a synonym of Entogonia. Lepidoptera and Some Other Life Forms considers it to be a valid genus.
