= Apodasmia rufonigraria =

Scientific classification
- Kingdom: Animalia
- Phylum: Arthropoda
- Class: Insecta
- Order: Lepidoptera
- Family: Geometridae
- Subfamily: Geometrinae
- Genus: Apodasmia; Turner, 1910
- Species: A. rufonigraria

Binomial name
- Apodasmia rufonigraria (Walker, 1862)

Synonyms
- Fidonia rufonigraria Walker, 1862

Sole species in monotypic geometer moth genus Apodasmia

Apodasmia rufonigraria is the sole species of Apodasmia, a monotypic genus of geometer moths. It was first described in 1862 (as Fidonia rufonigraria) by Francis Walker, and transferred to Apodasmia by Alfred Jefferis Turner. The species is found in Australia.
