= List of geometrid genera: C =

The very large moth family Geometridae contains genera beginning with A, B, C, D, E, F, G, H, I, J, K, L, M, N, O, P, Q, R, S, T, U, V, W, X, Y and Z.

Those beginning with C include:

- Cabera
- Cacochloris
- Cacopsodos
- Cacorista
- Cacostegania
- Cadyanda
- Caenosynteles
- Calamodes
- Calcaritis
- Caledasthena
- Caledophia
- Calicha
- Calichodes
- Callabraxas
- Calladelphia
- Callemo
- Calleremites
- Callerinnys
- Calletaera
- Calleulype
- Callhistia
- Calliclystis
- Callioratis
- Callipia
- Callipona
- Callipotnia
- Callipseustes
- Calliscotus
- Callisteuma
- Callocasta
- Callopsiodes
- Calluga
- Callurapteryx
- Callygris
- Callythria
- Calodyscia
- Calospilos
- Calostigiodes
- Calothysanis
- Calta
- Calyptocome
- Cambogia
- Camelopteryx
- Campaea
- Campatonema
- Campsiceras
- Camptogramma
- Camptolina
- Camptolophia
- Cancellalata
- Canelo
- Cannagara
- Capasa
- Caprilia
- Capusa
- Caradrinopsis
- Carbia
- Carecomotis
- Cargolia
- Carige
- Carima
- Caripeta
- Caripetodes
- Caripraea
- Carmala
- Carpella
- Carphoides
- Carphoxera
- Carptima
- Carsia
- Cartaletis
- Cartellodes
- Casbia
- Casilda
- Cassephyra
- Cassyma
- Cassythaphaga
- Casuariclystis
- Cataclysme
- Catacrismia
- Catadyscia
- Catarhoe
- Catarina
- Catascia
- Cataspilates
- Caterva
- Cathaemacta
- Cathydata
- Catocalopsis
- Catophoenissa
- Catoria
- Catrielia
- Celaenaclystis
- Celenna
- Celerena
- Celesdera
- Celidomphax
- Celonoptera
- Cenochlora
- Cenoctenucha
- Centrochria
- Centronaxa
- Cephalissa
- Cepphis
- Cerasympiasta
- Ceratodalia
- Ceratonyx
- Ceratucha
- Cernia
- Cerotricha
- Certima
- Ceruncina
- Cerurographa
- Chaetolopha
- Chalastra
- Chalyboclydon
- Charca
- Chariaspilates
- Charissa
- Charommataea
- Chartographa
- Chavarriella
- Cheimoptena
- Chelegnophos
- Chemerina
- Cheroscelis
- Chesiadodes
- Chesias
- Chesistege
- Cheteoscelis
- Chiasmia
- Chiasmiodes
- Chihuo
- Chilma
- Chionopora
- Chionopteryx
- Chizala
- Chlenias
- Chlenomorpha
- Chloeres
- Chloractis
- Chloraspilates
- Chlorerythra
- Chlorissa
- Chloristola
- Chlorochaeta
- Chlorochlamys
- Chlorochroma
- Chlorochromodes
- Chloroclydon
- Chloroclysta
- Chloroclystis
- Chlorocoma
- Chlorocraspedia
- Chloroctenis
- Chlorodes
- Chlorodontopera
- Chlorodrepana
- Chloroglyphica
- Chloromachia
- Chloromianta
- Chloromiza
- Chloromma
- Chloroparda
- Chloroplintha
- Chloropteryx
- Chlororithra
- Chlorosea
- Chlorosterrha
- Chlorostrota
- Chloroteras
- Chlorotimandra
- Chlorozancla
- Choara
- Chogada
- Cholomiza
- Chondrosoma
- Chooreechillum
- Chorizomena
- Chorodna
- Chorodnodes
- Chrioloba
- Chrismopteryx
- Christophiella
- Chrostobapta
- Chrotochlora
- Chrysoblephara
- Chrysochloroma
- Chrysoclystis
- Chrysocraspeda
- Chrysoctenis
- Chrysolarentia
- Chrysolene
- Chrysomima
- Chrysomphe
- Ciampa
- Cidaria
- Cidariophanes
- Cimicodes
- Cingilia
- Cinglis
- Circopetes
- Ciropteryx
- Cirretaera
- Cirrhorheuma
- Cirrhosoma
- Cirrolygris
- Cirsodes
- Cithecia
- Cladara
- Cleora
- Cleorodes
- Clepsimelea
- Clepsiphron
- Cleptocosmia
- Cleta
- Cnemodes
- Cnephora
- Cnestrognophos
- Cnissocnema
- Cochisea
- Codonia
- Coelocrossa
- Coenina
- Coenocalpe
- Coenocharis
- Coenolarentia
- Coenotephria
- Coironalia
- Collesis
- Collix
- Colocleora
- Colostygia
- Colotois
- Colpocraspeda
- Colpodonta
- Colutoceras
- Comeesia
- Comibaena
- Comostola
- Comostolodes
- Comostolopsis
- Compsoptera
- Conchocometa
- Conchylia
- Conchyliodes
- Coniodes
- Conolophia
- Conosara
- Contropis
- Cophocerotis
- Cophophlebia
- Cophopoda
- Coptogonia
- Coremecis
- Coribapta
- Corium
- Corotia
- Cortixa
- Corula
- Corymica
- Coryphista
- Corythea
- Cosmethis
- Cosmetodes
- Cosmogonia
- Cosmophyga
- Cosmorhoe
- Costaconvexa
- Costalobata
- Costignophos
- Cosymbia
- Cotta
- Cozistra
- Crasilogia
- Craspedia
- Craspediopsis
- Craspedosis
- Cratoptera
- Cretheis
- Criomacha
- Crocallis
- Crocopteryx
- Crocota
- Crocypus
- Cryopega
- Cryphaea
- Crypsicometa
- Crypsicrocis
- Crypsimetalla
- Crypsiphila
- Crypsiphona
- Crypsiplocia
- Crypsityla
- Cryptochorina
- Cryptoloba
- Cryptomedasina
- Cryptoscopa
- Ctenaulis
- Ctenistochlora
- Ctenoberta
- Ctenognophos
- Ctenothea
- Ctimene
- Culcula
- Culpinia
- Cundinamarca
- Curbia
- Cusiala
- Cusuma
- Cyclica
- Cyclomia
- Cyclophora
- Cycloprorodes
- Cyclothea
- Cyllopoda
- Cymatida
- Cymatophora
- Cymatoplex
- Cyneoterpna
- Cyphopteryx
- Cypra
- Cyrtesia
- Cyrtochila
- Cysteophora
- Cysteopteryx
- Cystidia
