= Cundinamarca =

Cundinamarca may refer to:

== Geography ==
- Cundinamarca Department (1886–present), Republic of Colombia
- Free and Independent State of Cundinamarca (1810–1815 Estado Libre e Independiente de Cundinamarca)
- Cundinamarca Department (1820), Gran Colombia roughly encompassing modern Colombia, Panama, and the Mosquito Coast
- Cundinamarca Department (1824), Gran Colombia
- Cundinamarca Province (1851), Republic of New Granada
- Cundinamarca State (1857)
1810 Prov. of Bogotá called itself State of Cundinamarca in 1813

1820 Department

1824 Department

1855 Province

1858 State

1863 State

1886 Department

== Biology ==
- Cundinamarca (moth)
