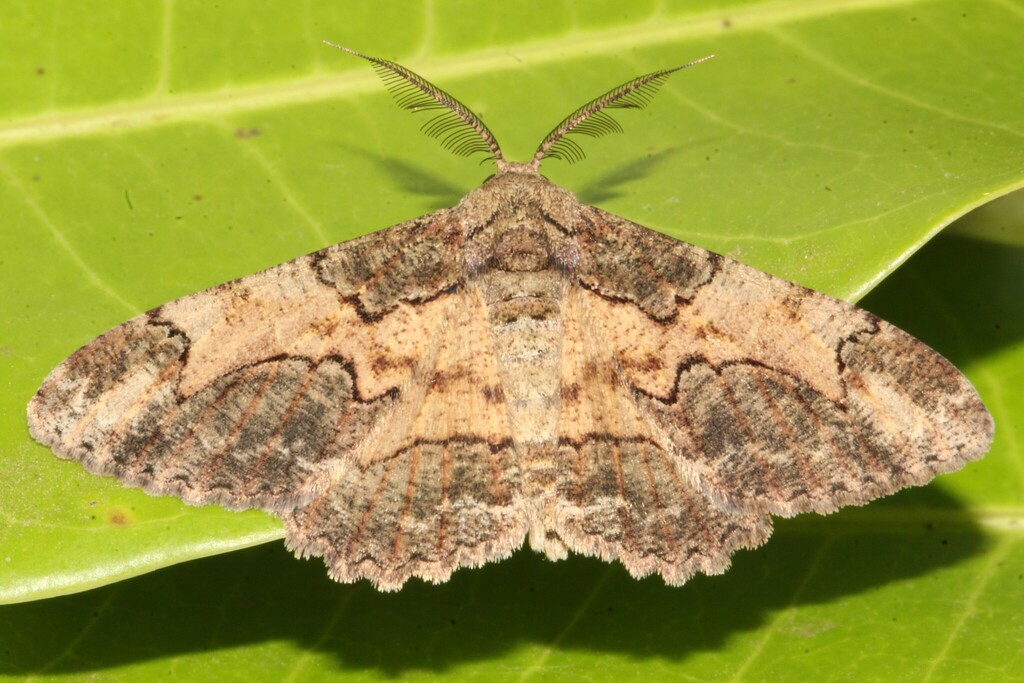

Scientific classification
- Kingdom: Animalia
- Phylum: Arthropoda
- Clade: Pancrustacea
- Class: Insecta
- Order: Lepidoptera
- Family: Geometridae
- Genus: Colocleora
- Species: C. divisaria

Binomial name
- Colocleora divisaria Walker, 1860

= Colocleora divisaria =

Species of moth

Colocleora divisaria is a species of moth in the family Geometridae. It was described by Francis Walker in 1860. This species can be found throughout the Afrotropical realm.

== Taxonomy ==
Colocleora divisaria contains the following subspecies:

- Colocleora divisaria chresima
- Colocleora divisaria divisaria
- Colocleora divisaria separaria
