= Carphoides incopriarius =

Scientific classification
- Kingdom: Animalia
- Phylum: Arthropoda
- Class: Insecta
- Order: Lepidoptera
- Family: Geometridae
- Genus: Carphoides
- Species: C. incopriarius

Binomial name
- Carphoides incopriarius (Hulst, 1887)

Synonyms
- Carphoides incopriaria

Species of moth

Carphoides incopriarius is a species of moth in the family Geometridae first described by George Duryea Hulst in 1887. It is found in North America.

The MONA or Hodges number for Carphoides incopriarius is 6624.
