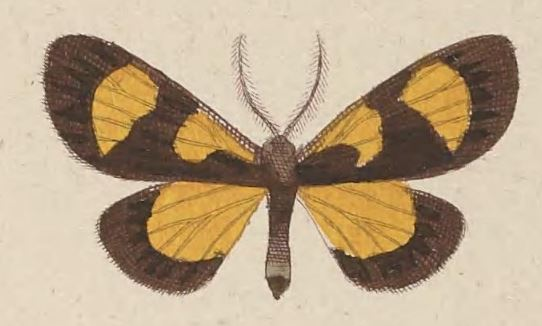

Scientific classification
- Kingdom: Animalia
- Phylum: Arthropoda
- Class: Insecta
- Order: Lepidoptera
- Family: Geometridae
- Genus: Ctimene
- Species: C. salamandra

Binomial name
- Ctimene salamandra (Kirsch, 1877)

Synonyms
- Bursada salamandra Kirsch, 1877; Bursada pyrifera Warren, 1896

= Ctimene salamandra =

Species of moth

Ctimene salamandra is a moth of the family Geometridae. It is found in New Guinea.

== Subspecies ==
- Ctimene salamandra salamandra
- Ctimene salamandra pyrifera (Warren, 1896)
