= Cusuma vilis =

Scientific classification
- Kingdom: Animalia
- Phylum: Arthropoda
- Class: Insecta
- Order: Lepidoptera
- Family: Geometridae
- Genus: Cusuma
- Species: C. vilis

Binomial name
- Cusuma vilis (Walker, 1854)

Synonyms
- Euschema vilis Walker, 1854

Species of moth

Cusuma vilis is a moth of the family Geometridae first described by Francis Walker in 1854. It is found in Sri Lanka.
