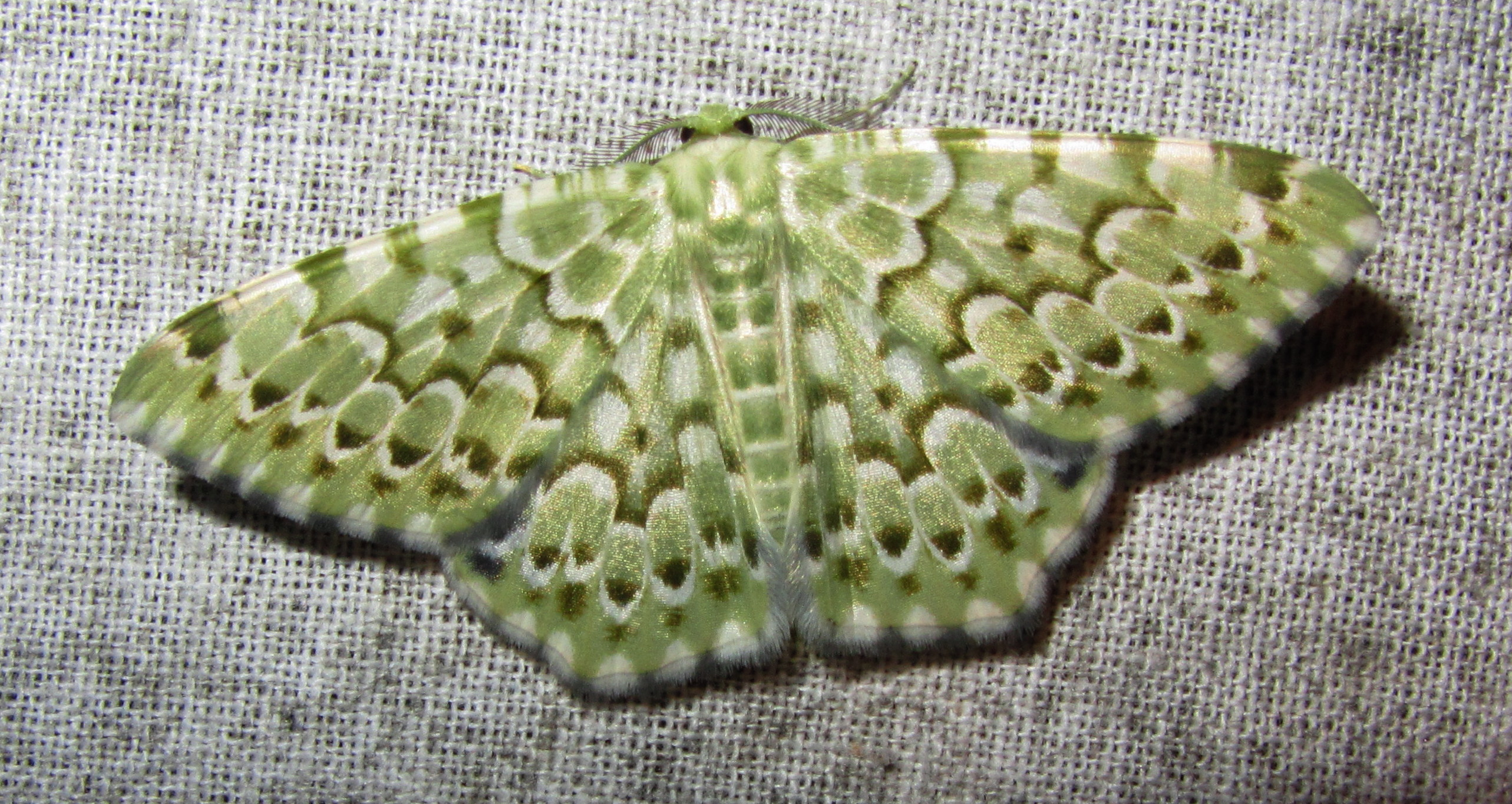

Scientific classification
- Domain: Eukaryota
- Kingdom: Animalia
- Phylum: Arthropoda
- Class: Insecta
- Order: Lepidoptera
- Family: Geometridae
- Genus: Chlororithra
- Species: C. fea

Binomial name
- Chlororithra fea Butler (1889)

= Chlororithra fea =

Species of moth

Chlororithra fea is a species of moth in the genus Chlororithra. It is native to India. It was first described by Butler in 1889. The larvae eats Quercus alba, commonly known as white oak and adults are active from spring to late summer.
