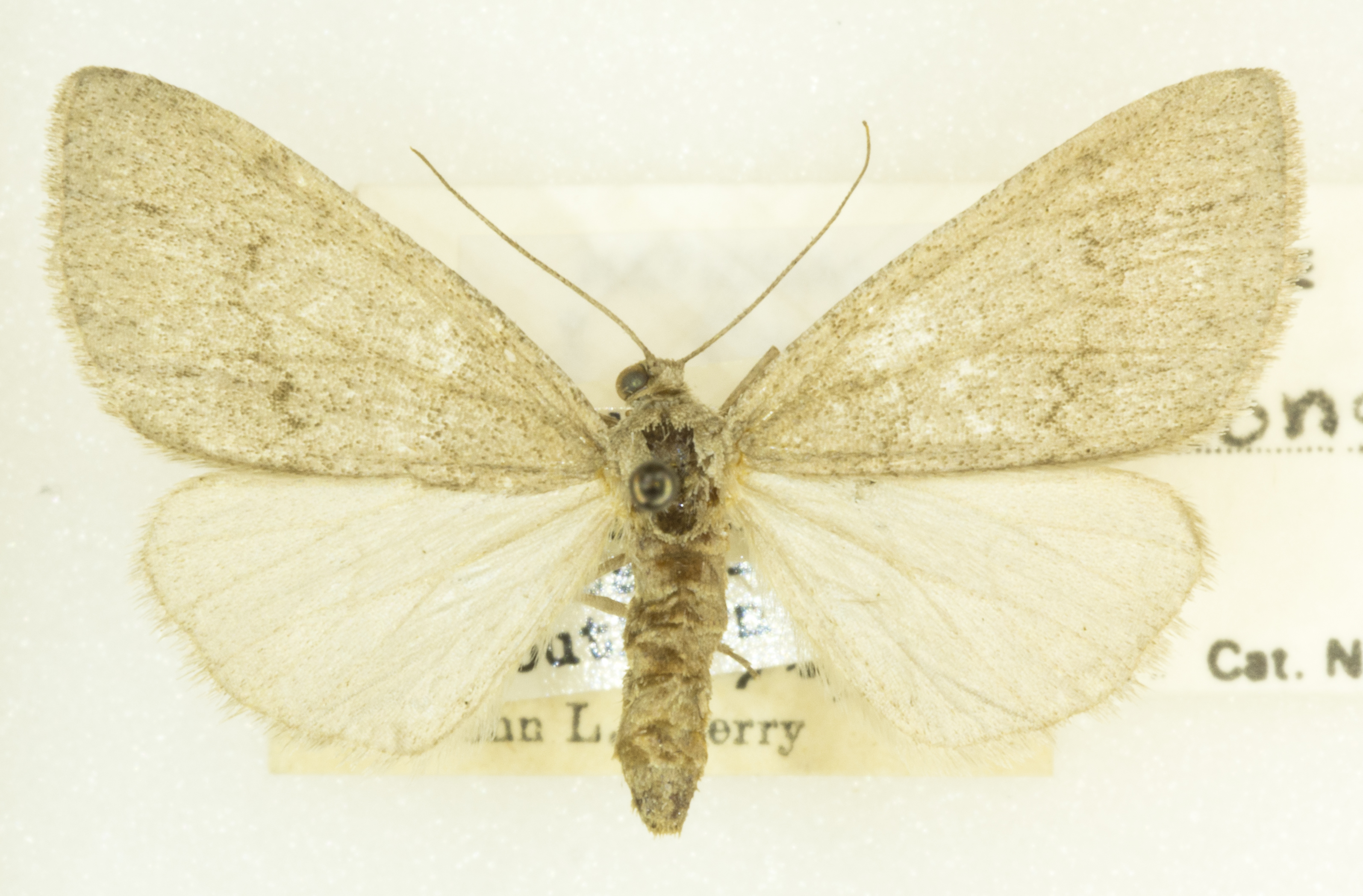

Scientific classification
- Domain: Eukaryota
- Kingdom: Animalia
- Phylum: Arthropoda
- Class: Insecta
- Order: Lepidoptera
- Family: Geometridae
- Genus: Carphoides
- Species: C. inconspicuaria

Binomial name
- Carphoides inconspicuaria (Barnes & McDunnough, 1916)

= Carphoides inconspicuaria =

Species of moth

Carphoides inconspicuaria is a species of moth in the family Geometridae first described by William Barnes and James Halliday McDunnough in 1916. It is found in North America.

The MONA or Hodges number for Carphoides inconspicuaria is 6625.
