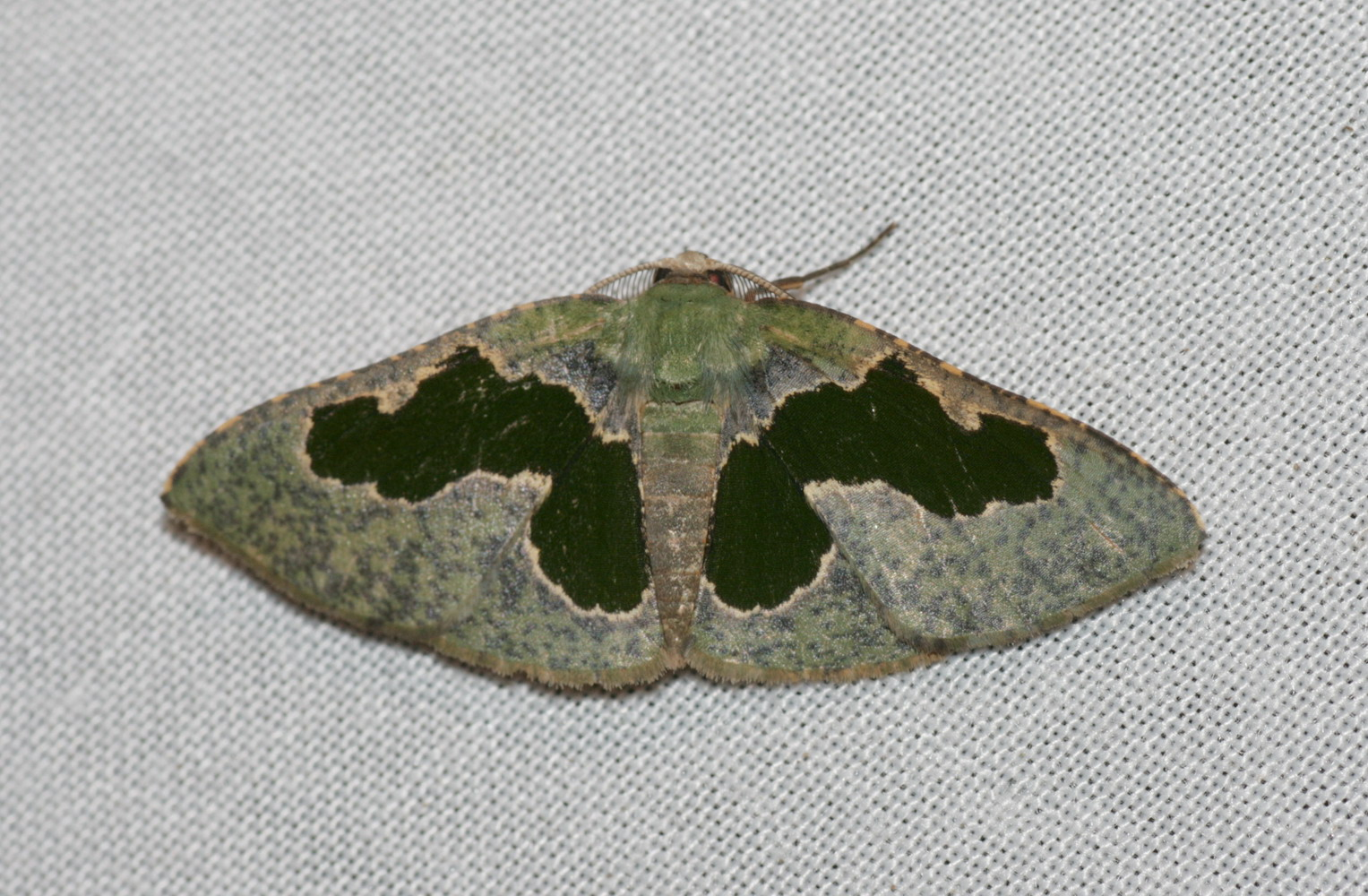

Scientific classification
- Kingdom: Animalia
- Phylum: Arthropoda
- Class: Insecta
- Order: Lepidoptera
- Family: Geometridae
- Genus: Celenna
- Species: C. centraria

Binomial name
- Celenna centraria (Snellen, 1880)

Synonyms
- Plutodes centraria Snellen, 1880; Hypochrosis mimaria Swinhoe, 1909

= Celenna centraria =

Species of moth

Celenna centraria is a moth of the family Geometridae first described by Snellen in 1880. It is found in Sumatra and Borneo.
