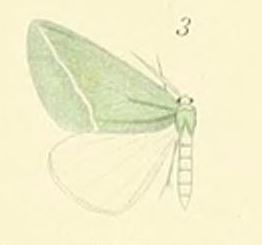

Scientific classification
- Kingdom: Animalia
- Phylum: Arthropoda
- Class: Insecta
- Order: Lepidoptera
- Family: Geometridae
- Genus: Chlorosterrha
- Species: C. semialba

Binomial name
- Chlorosterrha semialba (C. Swinhoe, 1906)

Synonyms
- Acollesis semialba C. Swinhoe, 1906

= Chlorosterrha semialba =

Species of moth

Chlorosterrha semialba is a moth in the family Geometridae first described by Charles Swinhoe in 1906. This species is known from Angola.
