= Cacochloris uvidula =

Scientific classification
- Kingdom: Animalia
- Phylum: Arthropoda
- Class: Insecta
- Order: Lepidoptera
- Family: Geometridae
- Genus: Cacochloris
- Species: C. uvidula

Binomial name
- Cacochloris uvidula Swinhoe, 1885

Species of moth

Cacochloris uvidula is a moth of the family Geometridae first described by Swinhoe in 1885. It is found in India and probably in Sri Lanka.
