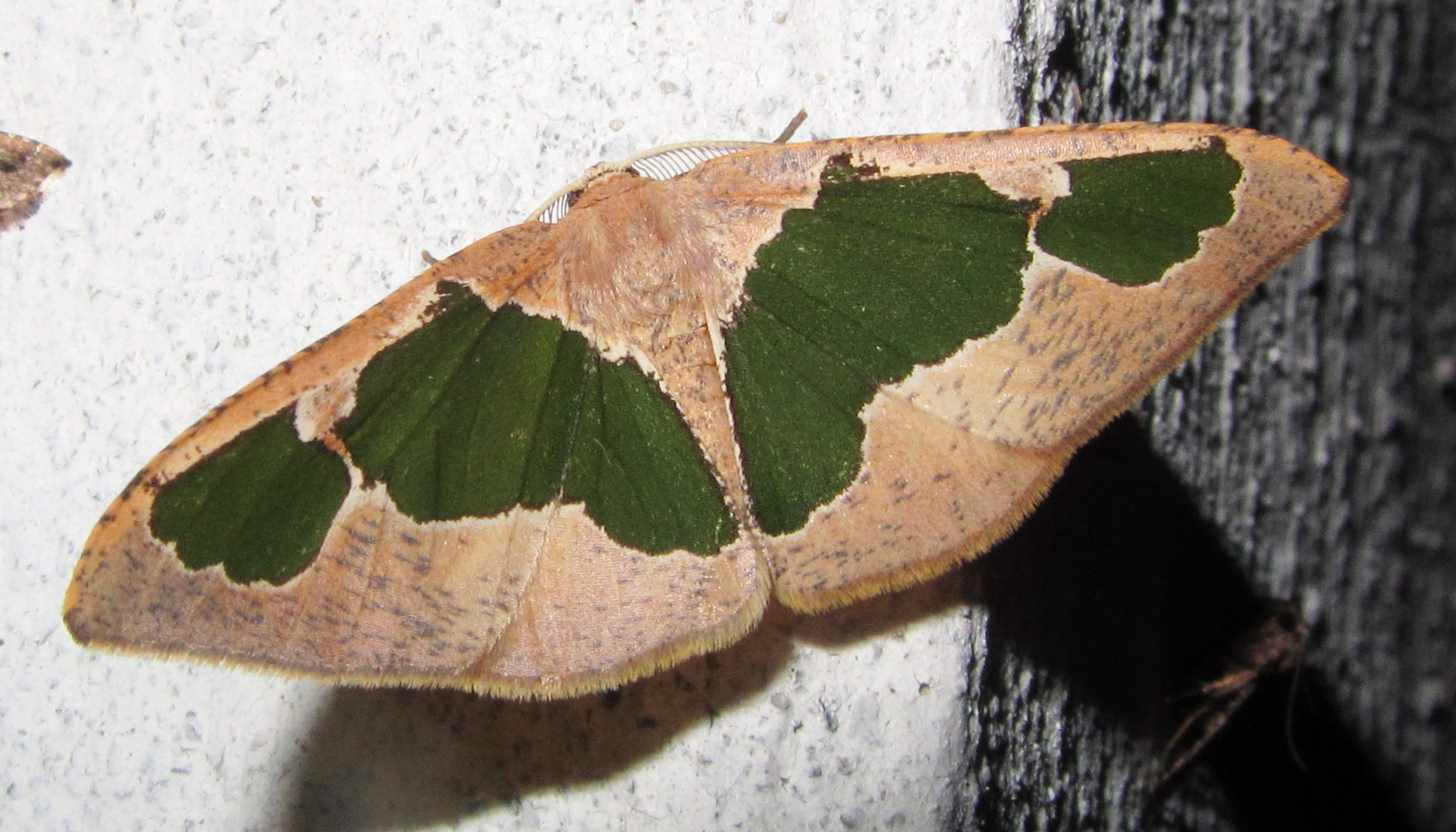

Scientific classification
- Kingdom: Animalia
- Phylum: Arthropoda
- Clade: Pancrustacea
- Class: Insecta
- Order: Lepidoptera
- Family: Geometridae
- Genus: Celenna
- Species: C. festivaria

Binomial name
- Celenna festivaria (Fabricius, 1794)

Synonyms
- Capasa festivaria Fabricius, 1794; Phalaena festivaria Fabricius, 1794; Geometra saturataria Walker, 1861; Hypochrosis festivaria temperata Prout, 1925; Hypochrosis festivaria formosensis Inoue 1964; Hypochrosis festivaria manifesta Inoue, 1964; Hypochrosis festivaria Fabricius; Holloway, 1976

= Celenna festivaria =

Species of moth

Celenna festivaria is a moth of the family Geometridae first described by Johan Christian Fabricius in 1794. It is found in India, Sri Lanka, Myanmar, Borneo, Java, Taiwan, the Ryukyu Islands of Japan, and Luzon in the Philippines.

== Description ==
Its ground color is brown. Dark green medial blotches are found on both wings. The hindwing patch has an excavation at the center of its interior margin. Its wingspan ranges between 31mm - 38mm approximately.

== Subspecies ==
Three subspecies are recognized.

- Celenna festivaria formosensis Inoue, 1964 - India, Sri Lanka, Myanmar, Borneo, Java, Taiwan
- Celenna festivaria manifesta Inoue, 1964 - Ryukyu Islands
- Celenna festivaria temperata Prout, 1925 - Philippines
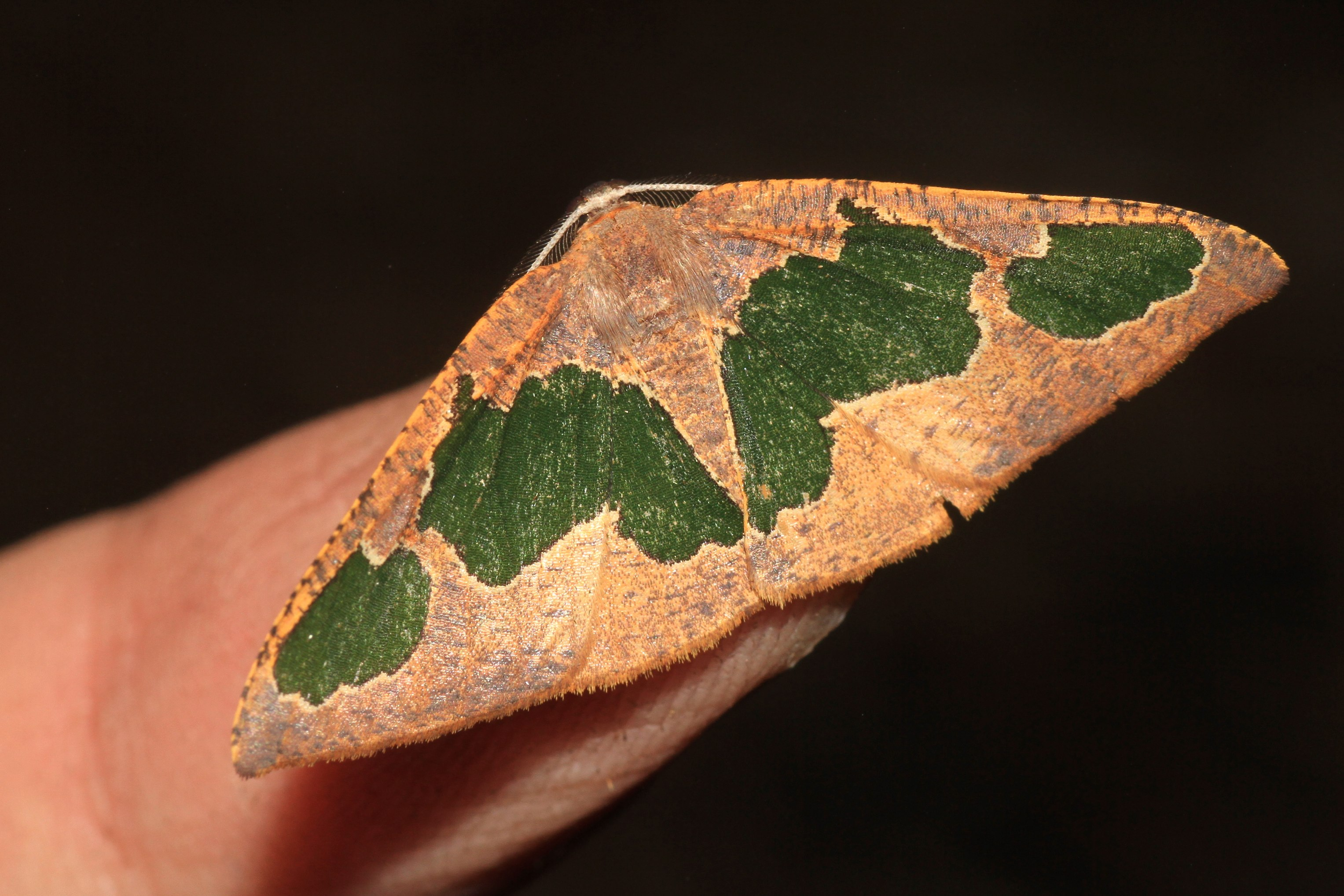
Borneo, Malaysia

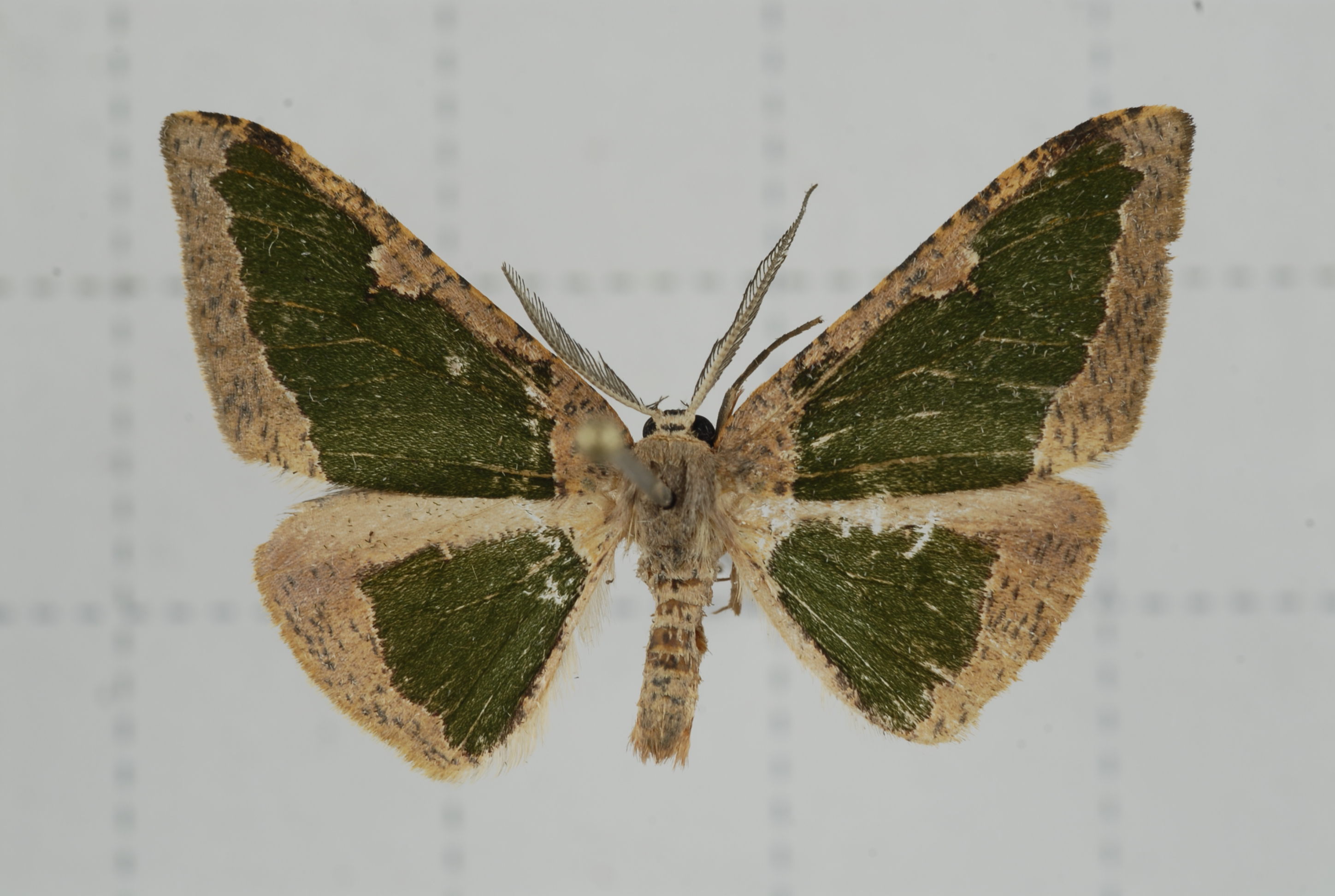
Subspecies formosensis

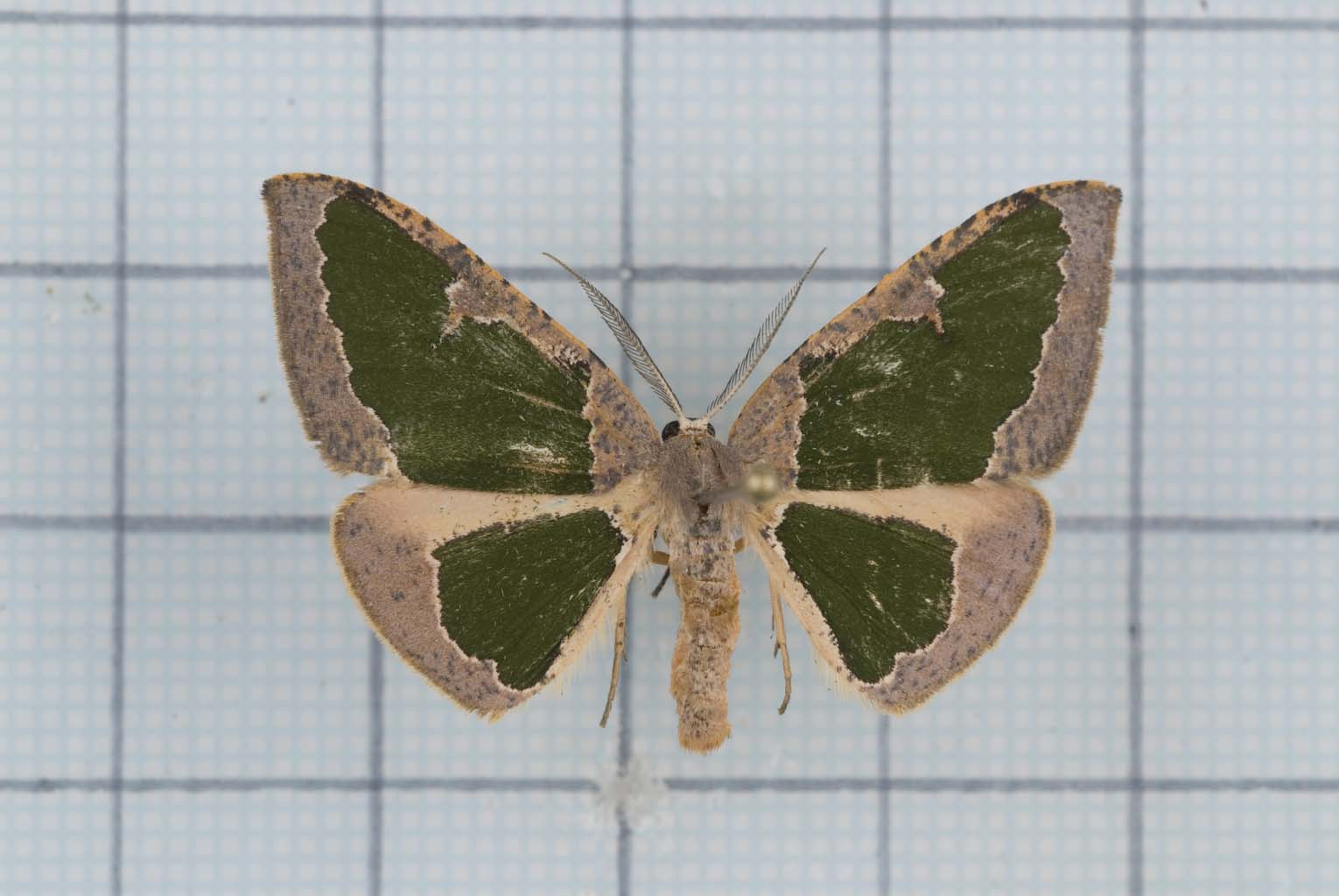
Dorsal surface
