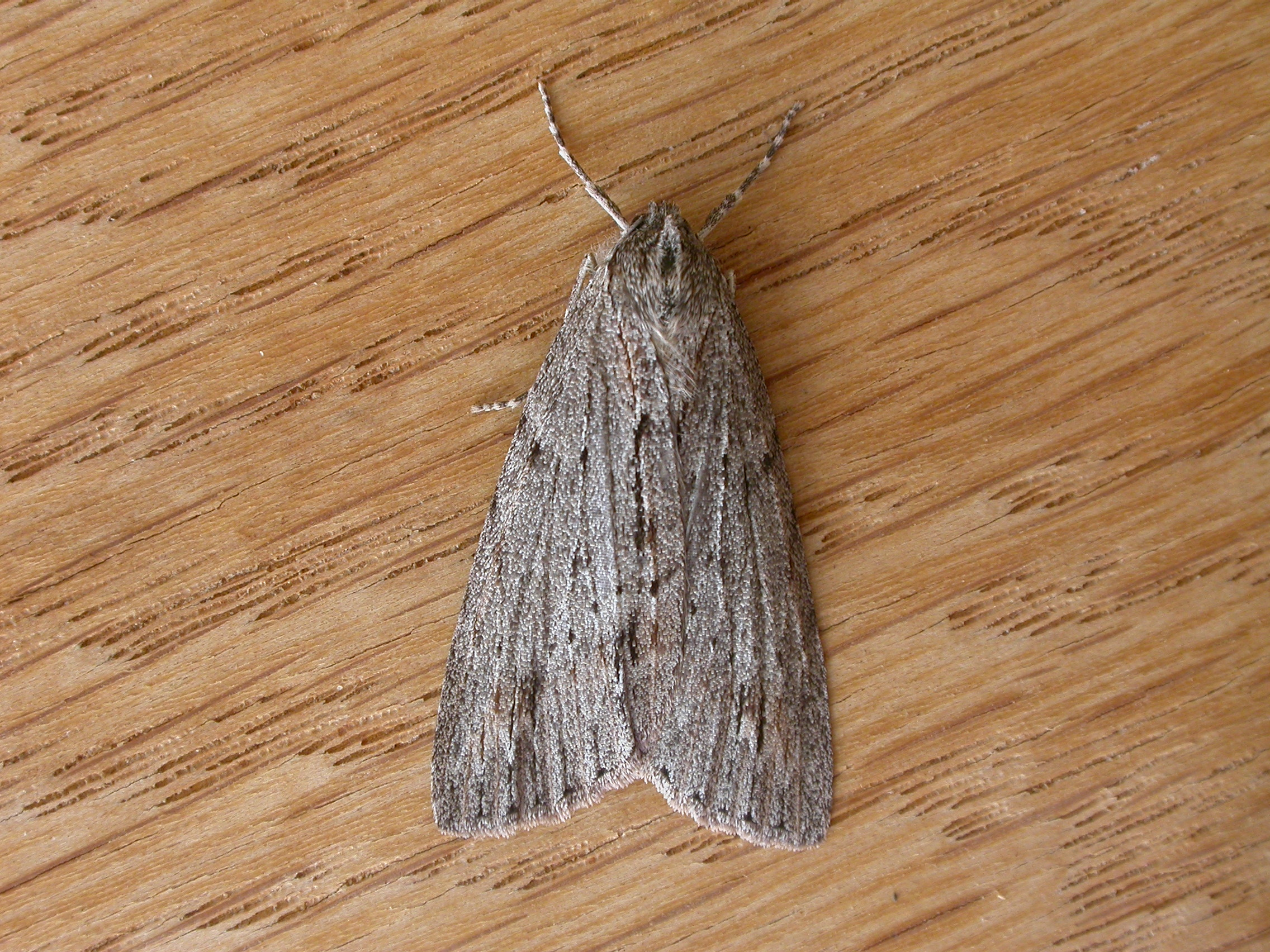

Scientific classification
- Domain: Eukaryota
- Kingdom: Animalia
- Phylum: Arthropoda
- Class: Insecta
- Order: Lepidoptera
- Family: Geometridae
- Genus: Chlenias
- Species: C. banksiaria

Binomial name
- Chlenias banksiaria (Le Guillou, 1841)

Synonyms
- Geometra banksiaria Le Guillou, 1841; Chlenias auctaria Guenée, 1857; Cleophana australasiae Wallengren, 1860; Chlenias indecisata Walker, 1862; Chlenias pachymela Lower, 1893; Chlenias acutaria Swinhoe, 1902

= Chlenias banksiaria =

Species of moth

Chlenias banksiaria is a moth of the family Geometridae first described by Élie Jean François Le Guillou in 1841. It is found in the Australian Capital Territory, New South Wales, Victoria and Tasmania.

The larvae feed from many species of unrelated plants, including the introduced Pinus radiata.
