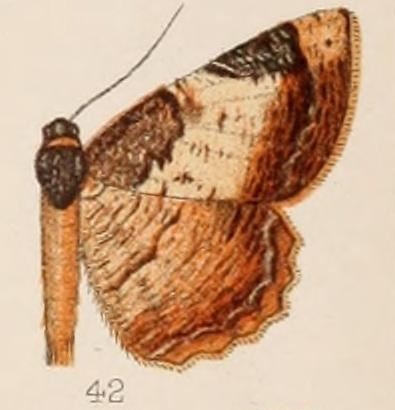

Scientific classification
- Kingdom: Animalia
- Phylum: Arthropoda
- Clade: Pancrustacea
- Class: Insecta
- Order: Lepidoptera
- Family: Geometridae
- Genus: Cassephyra
- Species: C. cyanosticta

Binomial name
- Cassephyra cyanosticta (Hampson, 1907)

Synonyms
- Hypephyra cyanosticta Hampson, 1907

= Cassephyra cyanosticta =

Species of moth

Cassephyra cyanosticta is a moth of the family Geometridae. It was first described by George Hampson in 1907. It is found in southern India.
