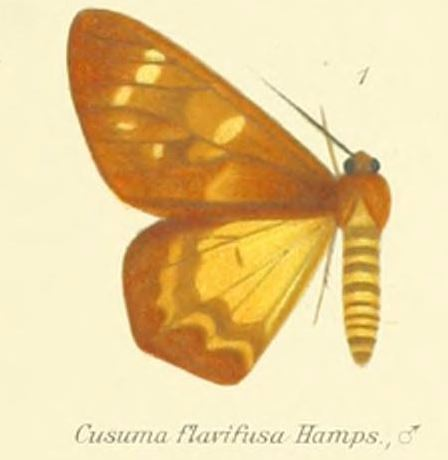

Scientific classification
- Kingdom: Animalia
- Phylum: Arthropoda
- Class: Insecta
- Order: Lepidoptera
- Family: Geometridae
- Genus: Cusuma
- Species: C. flavifusa

Binomial name
- Cusuma flavifusa Hampson, 1893

= Cusuma flavifusa =

Species of moth

Cusuma flavifusa is a moth of the family Geometridae first described by George Hampson in 1893. It is found in India and Sri Lanka.
