= Cusiala raptaria =

Scientific classification
- Kingdom: Animalia
- Phylum: Arthropoda
- Class: Insecta
- Order: Lepidoptera
- Family: Geometridae
- Genus: Cusiala
- Species: C. raptaria

Binomial name
- Cusiala raptaria Walker, 1860

Species of moth

Cusiala raptaria is a moth of the family Geometridae first described by Francis Walker in 1860. It is found in the Indian subregion and Sri Lanka.

The caterpillar is a pest of several crops such as Albizia procera, Carissa spinarum, Cassia fistula, Dalbergia sissoo, Eugenia cumini, Lannea coromandelica, Mallotus philippensis, Schleichera oleosa, Shorea robusta, Syzygium cumini and Xylia xylocarpa.
