= Carphoides setigera =

Scientific classification
- Domain: Eukaryota
- Kingdom: Animalia
- Phylum: Arthropoda
- Class: Insecta
- Order: Lepidoptera
- Family: Geometridae
- Subfamily: Ennominae
- Genus: Carphoides
- Species: C. setigera

Binomial name
- Carphoides setigera Rindge, 1958

Species of moth

Carphoides setigera, the green carphoides, is a species of geometrid moth in the family Geometridae. It is found in North America.

The MONA or Hodges number for Carphoides setigera is 6623.
