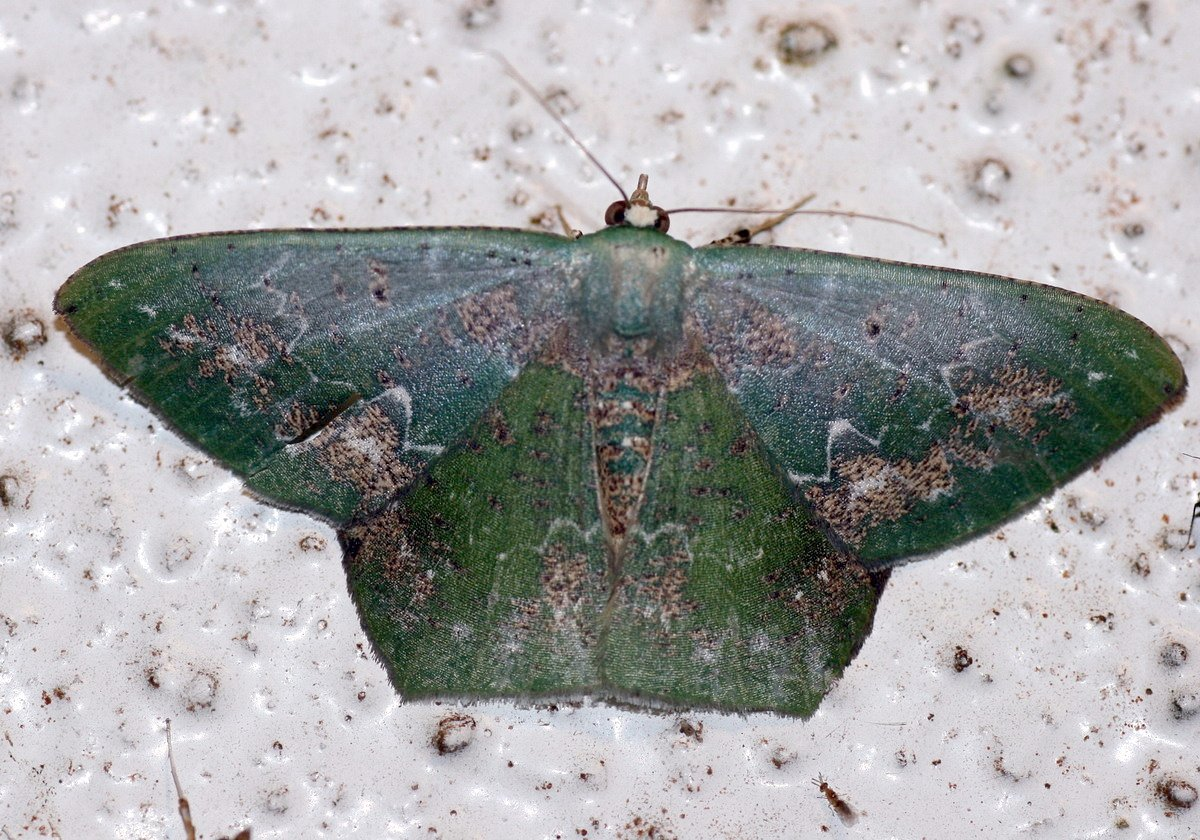
- Chloroglyphica sp.

Scientific classification
- Kingdom: Animalia
- Phylum: Arthropoda
- Class: Insecta
- Order: Lepidoptera
- Family: Geometridae
- Subfamily: Geometrinae
- Genus: Chloroglyphica; Warren, 1894

= Chloroglyphica =

Genus of moths

Chloroglyphica is a genus of moths in the family Geometridae.

== Species ==
- Chloroglyphica devecisi (Herbulot, 1992)
- Chloroglyphica variegata (Butler, 1889)
- Chloroglyphica xeromeris (Prout, 1932)
