= Cacochloris =

Scientific classification
- Kingdom: Animalia
- Phylum: Arthropoda
- Clade: Pancrustacea
- Class: Insecta
- Order: Lepidoptera
- Family: Geometridae
- Subfamily: Geometrinae
- Genus: Cacochloris; Prout, 1912

Genus of moths

Cacochloris is a genus of moths in the family Geometridae. The genus was first described by Prout in 1912.

== Species ==
- Cacochloris ochrea Warren, 1897
- Cacochloris uvidula Swinhoe, 1885
