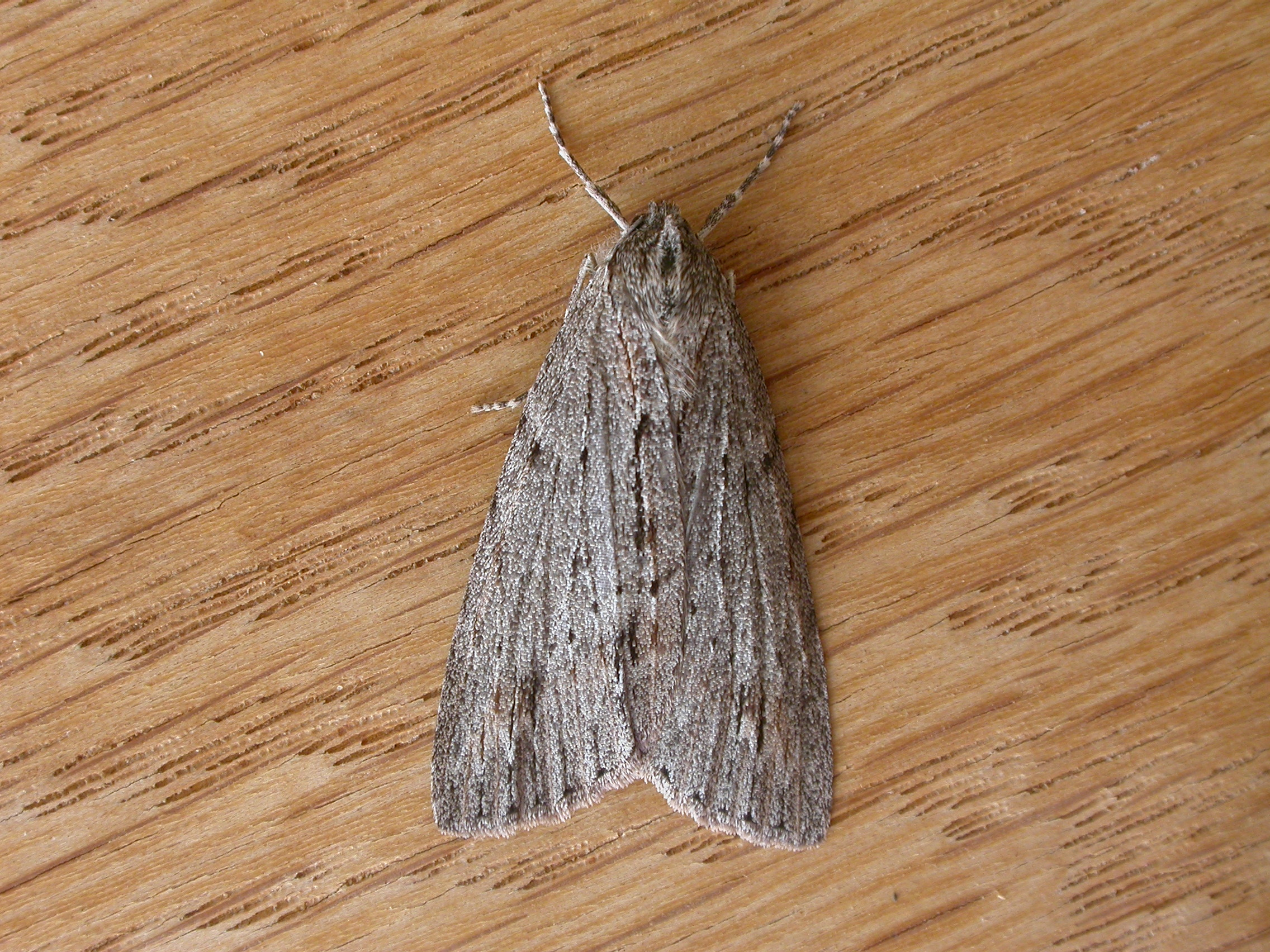
- Chlenias banksiaria

Scientific classification
- Kingdom: Animalia
- Phylum: Arthropoda
- Class: Insecta
- Order: Lepidoptera
- Family: Geometridae
- Subfamily: Ennominae
- Genus: Chlenias; Guenée, 1857

= Chlenias =

Genus of moths

Chlenias is a genus of moths in the family Geometridae. It has been recorded to mostly be found in Australia.

== Species ==
- Chlenias banksiaria (Le Guillou, 1841)
- Chlenias basichorda Turner, 1919
- Chlenias belophora (Turner, 1919)
- Chlenias cyclosticha Lower, 1915
- Chlenias gonosema Lower, 1893
- Chlenias inkata Tindale, 1961
- Chlenias macrochorda Turner, 1919
- Chlenias nodosus (Swinhoe, 1892)
- Chlenias ochrocrana Turner, 1947
- Chlenias pini Tindale, [1929]
- Chlenias seminigra Rosenstock, 1885
- Chlenias serina Lower, 1900
- Chlenias stenosticha Turner, 1919
- Chlenias zonaea Guest, 1887
