= Cymatoplex =

Scientific classification
- Kingdom: Animalia
- Phylum: Arthropoda
- Class: Insecta
- Order: Lepidoptera
- Family: Geometridae
- Subfamily: Geometrinae
- Genus: Cymatoplex; Turner, 1910

Genus of moths

Cymatoplex is a genus of moths in the family Geometridae.

== Species ==
- Cymatoplex halcyone (Meyrick, 1889)
- Cymatoplex hypolichna Turner, 1910
- Cymatoplex subpellucida Aurivillius, 1920
