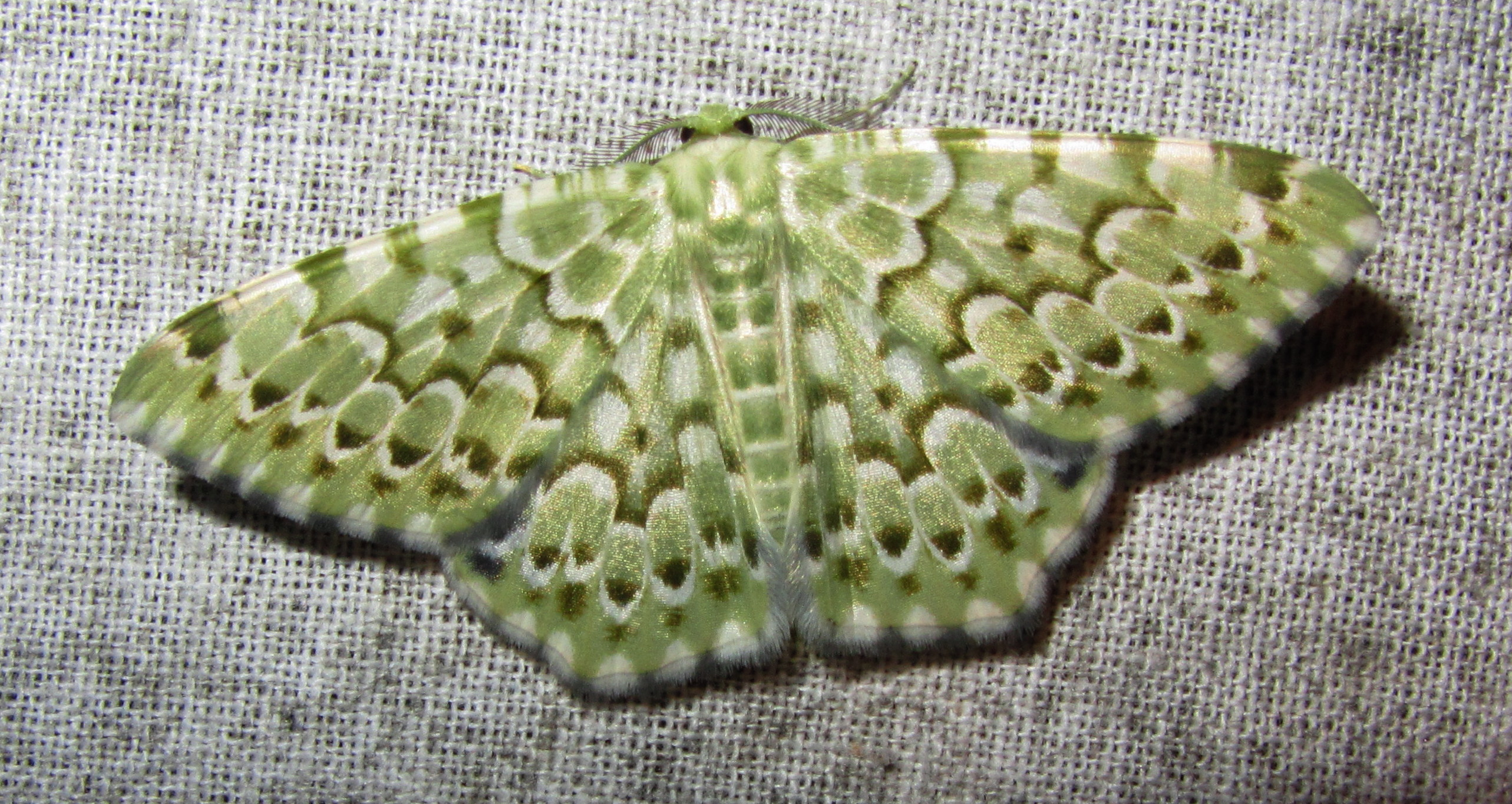
- Chlororithra fea

Scientific classification
- Kingdom: Animalia
- Phylum: Arthropoda
- Class: Insecta
- Order: Lepidoptera
- Family: Geometridae
- Subfamily: Geometrinae
- Genus: Chlororithra; Butler, 1889

Type species
- Chlororithra fea Butler, 1889

= Chlororithra =

Genus of moths

Chlororithra is a genus of moths in the family Geometridae erected by Arthur Gardiner Butler in 1889.

== Species ==
Some species of this genus are:

- Chlororithra fea Butler, 1889 (from China, Tibet, India, Nepal, Bhutan, Burma & Pakistan)
- Chlororithra fea missioniaria (subspecies of fea) Oberthür, 1916 (from China)
