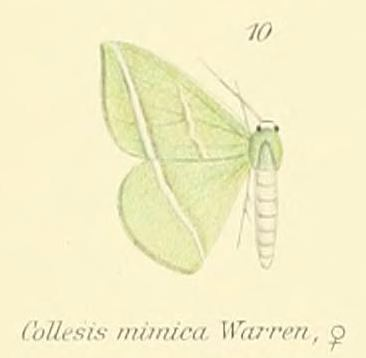
- Collesis mimica

Scientific classification
- Kingdom: Animalia
- Phylum: Arthropoda
- Clade: Pancrustacea
- Class: Insecta
- Order: Lepidoptera
- Family: Geometridae
- Subfamily: Geometrinae
- Genus: Collesis; Warren, 1897

= Collesis =

Genus of moths

Collesis is a genus of moths in the family Geometridae described by Warren in 1897.

== Species ==
- Collesis fleximargo (Warren, 1909) Angola
- Collesis mimica Warren, 1897 Democratic Republic of the Congo, Kenya, Malawi, Mozambique, Rwanda, Uganda, Zambia, Zimbabwe

== Bibliography ==
- Pitkin, Brian & Jenkins, Paul. "Search results Family: Geometridae". Butterflies and Moths of the World. Natural History Museum, London.
- "Collesis {genus}". Barcode of Life Data System.
