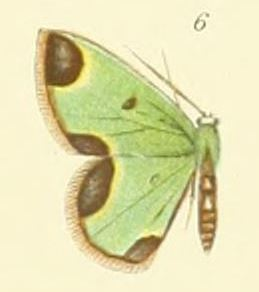
- Chavarriella psittacina

Scientific classification
- Kingdom: Animalia
- Phylum: Arthropoda
- Class: Insecta
- Order: Lepidoptera
- Family: Geometridae
- Subfamily: Geometrinae
- Genus: Chavarriella; Pitkin, 1993

= Chavarriella =

Genus of moths

Chavarriella is a genus of moths in the family Geometridae. The genus was described by Pitkin in 1993.

== Species ==
- Chavarriella brunneilinea Prout, 1912
- Chavarriella distinguenda Dognin, 1923
- Chavarriella excelsa Dognin, 1910
- Chavarriella fallax Warren, 1907
- Chavarriella lafayaria Dognin, 1892
  - Chavarriella lafayaria ssp. promontoria Warren, 1904
- Chavarriella lugentiscripta Prout, 1917
  - Chavarriella lugentiscripta ssp. dubia Prout, 1917
- Chavarriella luteifimbria Dognin, 1901
- Chavarriella pelops Prout, 1932
- Chavarriella porcius Schaus, 1912
- Chavarriella psittacina Prout, 1910
- Chavarriella semiornata Warren, 1901
- Chavarriella sophrosyne Prout, 1932
- Chavarriella trianteris Prout, 1932
- Chavarriella urania Herbulot, 1988
