= Cusiala =

Scientific classification
- Domain: Eukaryota
- Kingdom: Animalia
- Phylum: Arthropoda
- Class: Insecta
- Order: Lepidoptera
- Family: Geometridae
- Tribe: Boarmiini
- Genus: Cusiala; Moore, [1887]

Genus of moths

Cusiala is a genus of moths in the family Geometridae.

== Species ==
- Cusiala boarmoides Moore, [1887]
- Cusiala raptaria Walker
- Cusiala stipitaria (Oberthür, 1880)
