= Cenochlora =

Scientific classification
- Kingdom: Animalia
- Phylum: Arthropoda
- Class: Insecta
- Order: Lepidoptera
- Family: Geometridae
- Subfamily: Geometrinae
- Genus: Cenochlora; Warren, 1898

Genus of moths

Cenochlora is a genus of moths in the family Geometridae.

== Species ==
- Cenochlora quieta (Lucas, 1892)
