= Chlorozancla =

Scientific classification
- Kingdom: Animalia
- Phylum: Arthropoda
- Clade: Pancrustacea
- Class: Insecta
- Order: Lepidoptera
- Family: Geometridae
- Genus: Chlorozancla; Prout, 1912
- Species: C. falcatus

Binomial name
- Chlorozancla falcatus Hampson, 1895

Genus of moths

Chlorozancla is a genus of moths in the family Geometridae. It contains a single species, Chlorozancla falcatus, which was described in 1895.
