= Celidomphax =

Scientific classification
- Kingdom: Animalia
- Phylum: Arthropoda
- Clade: Pancrustacea
- Class: Insecta
- Order: Lepidoptera
- Family: Geometridae
- Subfamily: Geometrinae
- Genus: Celidomphax; Prout, 1912

Genus of moths

Celidomphax is a genus of moths in the family Geometridae.

== Species ==
- Celidomphax prolongata Prout, 1915
- Celidomphax rubrimaculata (Warren, 1905)
