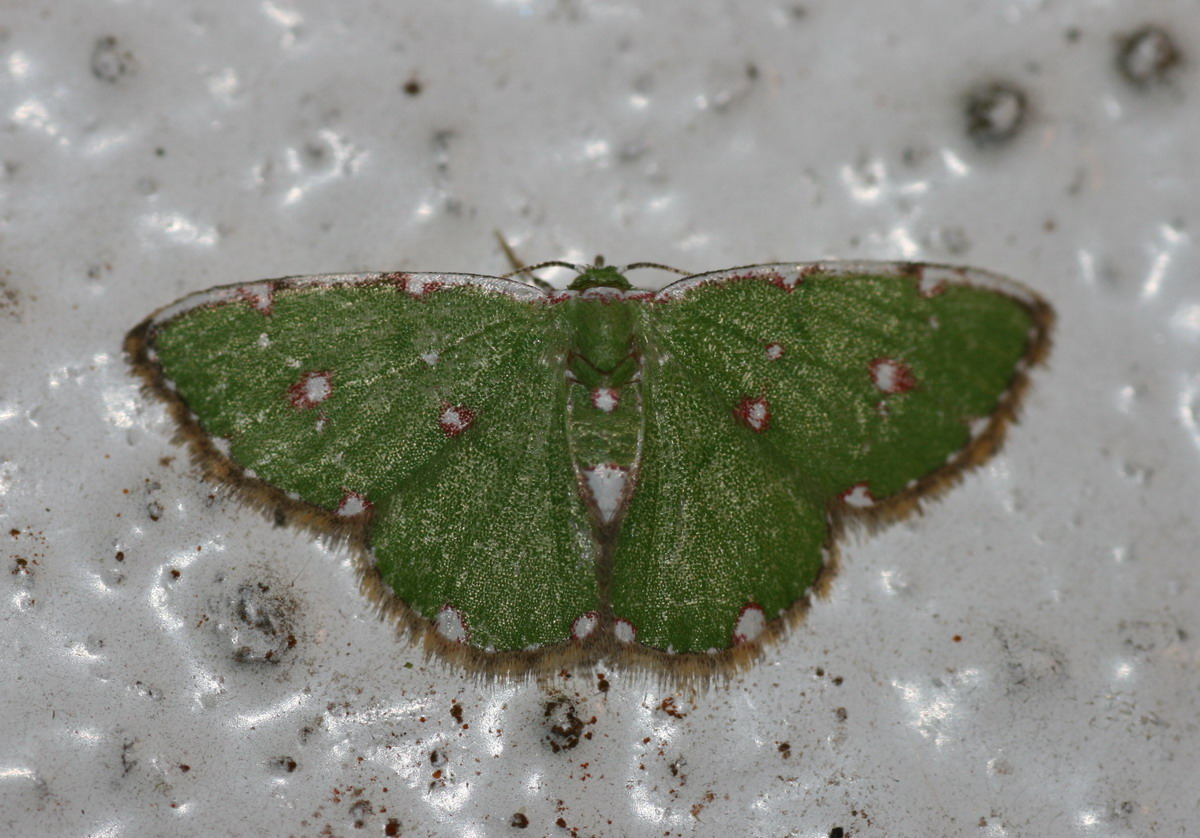

Scientific classification
- Kingdom: Animalia
- Phylum: Arthropoda
- Class: Insecta
- Order: Lepidoptera
- Family: Geometridae
- Subfamily: Geometrinae
- Genus: Comostolodes; Warren, 1896

= Comostolodes =

Genus of moths

Comostolodes is a genus of moths in the family Geometridae.

== Species ==
- Comostolodes albicatena Warren, 1896
- Comostolodes chlorochromodes Prout
- Comostolodes dialitha (West, 1930)
- Comostolodes subhyalina Warren
- Comostolodes tenera Warren
