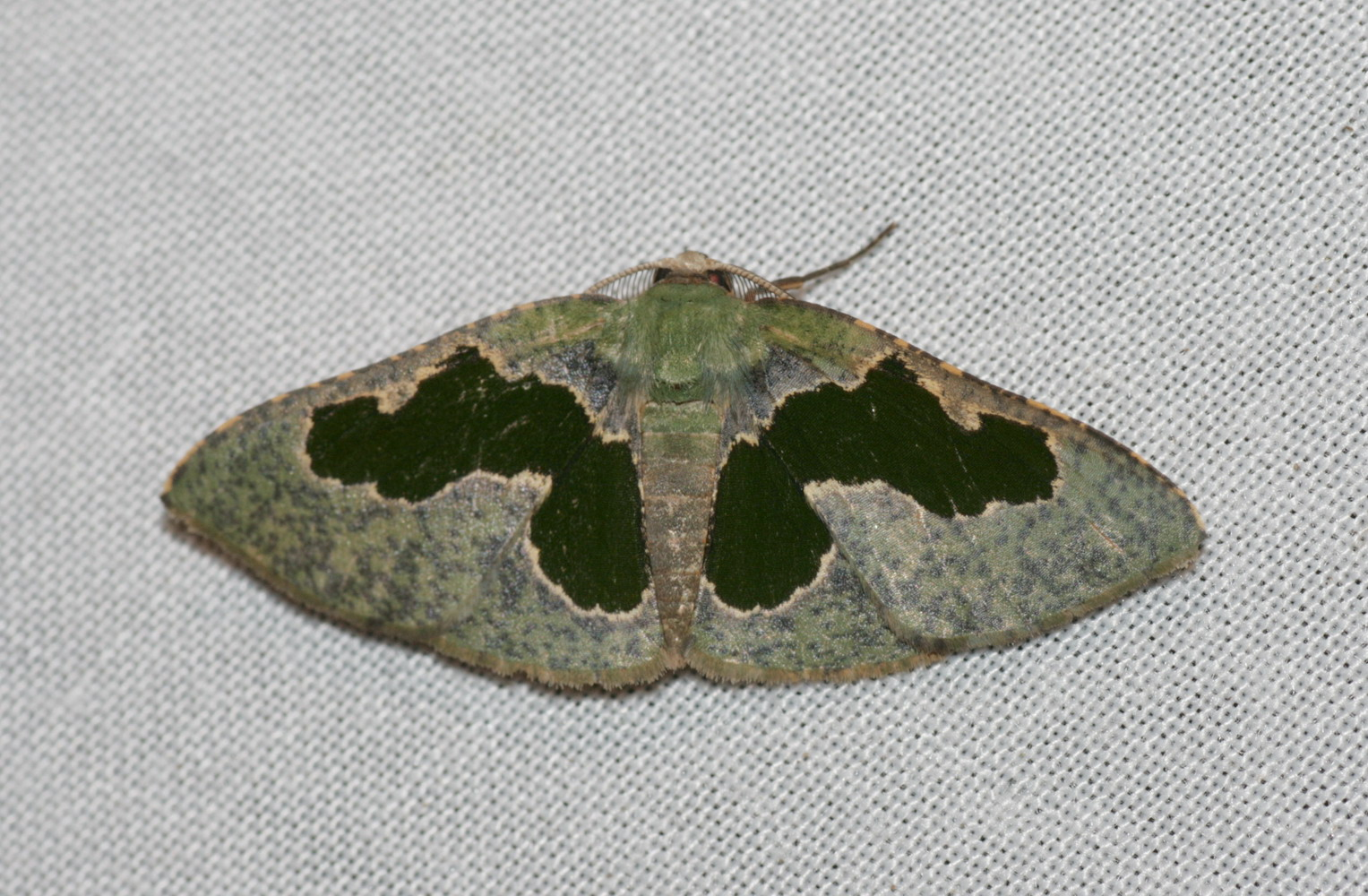
- Celenna centraria

Scientific classification
- Kingdom: Animalia
- Phylum: Arthropoda
- Class: Insecta
- Order: Lepidoptera
- Family: Geometridae
- Subfamily: Ennominae
- Genus: Celenna; Walker, 1861

= Celenna =

Genus of moths

Celenna is a genus of moths in the family Geometridae.

== Species ==
- Celenna agalma (Prout, 1922)
- Celenna brachygenyx (Prout, 1925)
- Celenna callopistes (Prout, 1932)
- Celenna centraria (Snellen, 1880)
- Celenna chlorophora (Warren, 1897)
- Celenna festivaria (Fabricius, 1794)
- Celenna imbutaria (Walker, 1866)
- Celenna muscicolor (Warren, 1893)
- Celenna pulchraria (Rothschild, 1894)
