= Celonoptera =

Scientific classification
- Kingdom: Animalia
- Phylum: Arthropoda
- Clade: Pancrustacea
- Class: Insecta
- Order: Lepidoptera
- Family: Geometridae
- Genus: Celonoptera; Lederer, 1862
- Species: C. mirificaria

Binomial name
- Celonoptera mirificaria Lederer, 1862

Synonyms
- Generic: Sparta Staudinger, 1862; Specific: Sparta paradoxaria Staudinger, 1862

Genus of moths

Celonoptera is a monotypic genus of moths in the family Geometridae. Its only species, Celonoptera mirificaria, is found in south-eastern Europe. Both the genus and species were first described by Julius Lederer in 1862.
