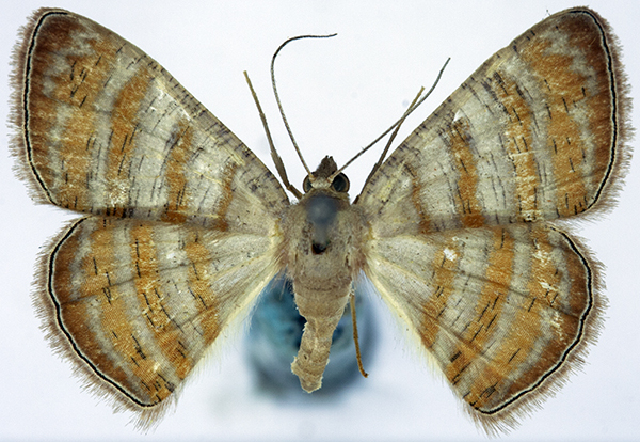
- Casbia isogramma

Scientific classification
- Kingdom: Animalia
- Phylum: Arthropoda
- Class: Insecta
- Order: Lepidoptera
- Family: Geometridae
- Tribe: Caberini
- Genus: Casbia; Walker, 1866

= Casbia =

Genus of moths

Casbia is a genus of moths in the family Geometridae erected by Francis Walker in 1866.

== Species ==
- Casbia adoxa Turner, 1947
- Casbia albinotata Warren, 1903
- Casbia aviata (Walker, 1861)
- Casbia calliorma Turner, 1919
- Casbia catharodes (Turner, 1904)
- Casbia celidosema Turner, 1947
- Casbia coniodes Turner, 1947
- Casbia crataea Turner, 1939
- Casbia cremnias (Meyrick, 1892)
- Casbia didymosticta Turner, 1947
- Casbia eremias (Meyrick, 1892)
- Casbia eutactopis Turner, 1947
- Casbia farinalis (Rosenstock, 1885)
- Casbia fasciata (Warren, 1896)
- Casbia glaucochroa (Turner, 1906)
- Casbia impressaria (Walker, 1861)
- Casbia leptorrhoda Turner, 1947
- Casbia lithodora (Meyrick, 1892)
- Casbia melanops Rosenstock, 1885
- Casbia ochthadia (Meyrick, 1892)
- Casbia oenias (Meyrick, 1892)
- Casbia pallens Turner, 1947
- Casbia plinthodes Turner, 1947
- Casbia rectaria Walker, 1866
- Casbia rhodoptila Turner, 1919
- Casbia rhodosceles Turner, 1939
- Casbia scardamiata Warren, 1898
- Casbia spodochroa (Turner, 1947)
- Casbia synempora Turner, 1919
- Casbia tanaoctena Turner, 1947
