= Crypsiphila =

Scientific classification
- Kingdom: Animalia
- Phylum: Arthropoda
- Class: Insecta
- Order: Lepidoptera
- Family: Geometridae
- Subfamily: Ennominae
- Genus: Crypsiphila; Turner, 1947

Genus of moths

Crypsiphila is a genus of moths in the family Geometridae.

== Species ==
- Crypsiphila atmophanes Turner, 1947
