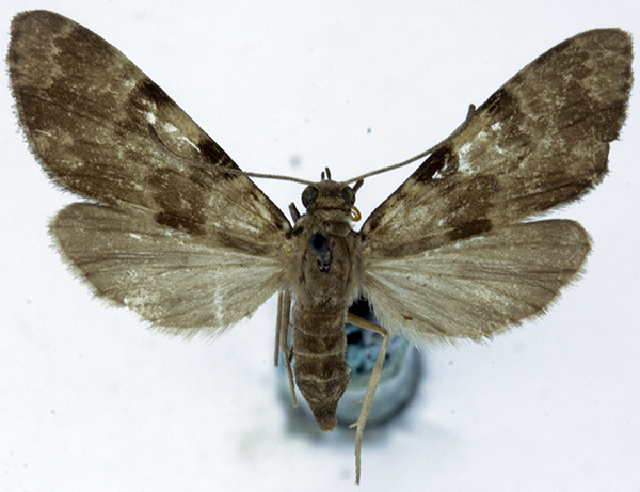
- Clepsimelea phryganeoides

Scientific classification
- Kingdom: Animalia
- Phylum: Arthropoda
- Class: Insecta
- Order: Lepidoptera
- Family: Geometridae
- Subfamily: Ennominae
- Genus: Clepsimelea; Warren, 1897

= Clepsimelea =

Genus of moths

Clepsimelea is a genus of moths in the family Geometridae.

== Species ==
- Clepsimelea phryganeoides Warren, 1897
