= Cycloprorodes =

Scientific classification
- Domain: Eukaryota
- Kingdom: Animalia
- Phylum: Arthropoda
- Class: Insecta
- Order: Lepidoptera
- Family: Geometridae
- Subfamily: Ennominae
- Genus: Cycloprorodes; Turner, 1939

Genus of moths

Cycloprorodes is a genus of moths in the family Geometridae.

== Species ==
- Cycloprorodes melanoxysta (Meyrick, 1892)
