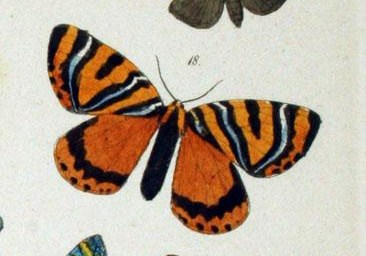

Scientific classification
- Kingdom: Animalia
- Phylum: Arthropoda
- Class: Insecta
- Order: Lepidoptera
- Family: Geometridae
- Subfamily: Ennominae
- Genus: Callioratis; Felder, 1874

= Callioratis =

Genus of moths

Callioratis is a genus of moths in the family Geometridae.

== Species ==
- Callioratis abraxas Felder, 1874
- Callioratis apicisecta Prout, 1915
- Callioratis abraxis
- Callioratis millarii
- Callioratis boisduvalii
- Callioratis grandis
