= Callerinnys =

Scientific classification
- Kingdom: Animalia
- Phylum: Arthropoda
- Class: Insecta
- Order: Lepidoptera
- Family: Geometridae
- Subfamily: Ennominae
- Genus: Callerinnys; Warren, 1894

Type species
- Erinnys combusta Warren, 1893

Synonyms
- Erinnys Warren, 1893

Genus of moths

Callerinnys is a genus of moths in the family Geometridae described by Warren in 1894.

== Species ==
- Callerinnys combusta Warren, 1893 (from India)
- Callerinnys fuscomarginata Warren, 1893 (from India)
- Callerinnys obliquilinea Moore, 1888 (from India)
