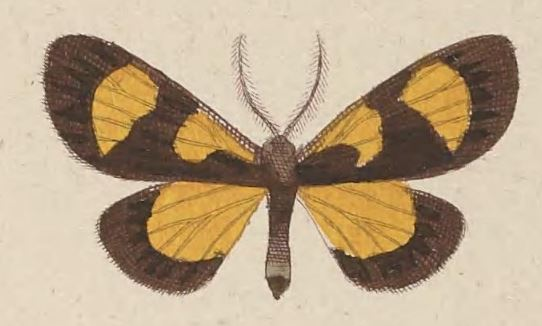
- Ctimeine salamandra

Scientific classification
- Kingdom: Animalia
- Phylum: Arthropoda
- Class: Insecta
- Order: Lepidoptera
- Family: Geometridae
- Subfamily: Ennominae
- Genus: Ctimene; Boisduval, 1832

Synonyms
- Abraxides Aurivillius, 1882; Cyrtochila Felder, 1874; Bursada Walker 1865

= Ctimene (moth) =

Genus of moths

Ctimene is a genus of moths in the family Geometridae.

== Species ==
- Ctimene abasalis Rothschild 1915
- Ctimene albicolor Warren 1898
- Ctimene albifrons Warren 1898
- Ctimene albilunata Warren 1905
- Ctimene alboguttata Pagenstecher 1896
- Ctimene arybasa Walker 1862
- Ctimene aurinata Walker 1864
- Ctimene basistriga Walker 1864
- Ctimene bistrigata Warren 1896
- Ctimene brachypus Prout 1929
- Ctimene carens Warren 1906
- Ctimene colenda Swinhoe 1902
- Ctimene concinna Warren 1894
- Ctimene conjunctiva Warren 1905
- Ctimene contracta Walker 1864
- Ctimene deceptrix Prout 1931
- Ctimene dependens Warren 1905
- Ctimene detecta Warren 1907
- Ctimene excellens Butler 1887
- Ctimene fidonioides Walker 1864
- Ctimene flavannulata Warren 1899
- Ctimene flavifrons Warren 1906
- Ctimene fulvimacula Warren 1895
- Ctimene hieroglyphica Walker 1864
- Ctimene hyaloplaga Warren 1896
- Ctimene hysginospila Prout 1916
- Ctimene intercisa Walker 1865
- Ctimene interruptata Warren
- Ctimene interspilata Warren 1899
- Ctimene invadens Warren 1899
- Ctimene inversa Warren 1899
- Ctimene lativitta Warren 1902
- Ctimene magata Felder 1874
- Ctimene minor Felder
- Ctimene nocturnignis Holloway 1979
- Ctimene oblongata Swinhoe 1900
- Ctimene obnubilata Warren 1898
- Ctimene obsoleta Warren 1899
- Ctimene ocreata Prout 1922
- Ctimene oppositata Warren 1896
- Ctimene percurrens Warren 1901
- Ctimene perdica Cramer 1779
- Ctimene piepersiata Snellen 1881
- Ctimene placens Pagenstecher 1886
- Ctimene plagiata Walker 1864
- Ctimene pyrifera Warren 1896
- Ctimene quadripartita Walker 1864
- Ctimene radicata Warren 1899
- Ctimene restricta Warren 1905
- Ctimene rubropicta Thierry-Mieg 1915
- Ctimene salamandra Kirsch 1877
- Ctimene salamandra Pagenstecher 1886
- Ctimene septemnotata Warren 1897
- Ctimene spilognota Prout 1931
- Ctimene splendida Walker 1864
- Ctimene suspensa Swinhoe 1902
- Ctimene synestia Meyrick 1886
- Ctimene synestia Turner 1919
- Ctimene tenebricosa Prout 1924
- Ctimene tricinctaria Linnaeus 1767
- Ctimene trispilata Warren 1897
- Ctimene truncata Walker 1864
- Ctimene unifascia Warren 1899
- Ctimene vacuata Warren 1898
- Ctimene velata Warren 1906
- Ctimene vestigiata Snellen 1881
- Ctimene wallacei Felder 1868
- Ctimene xanthomelas Boisduval 1832
