= Carpella =

Scientific classification
- Kingdom: Animalia
- Phylum: Arthropoda
- Class: Insecta
- Order: Lepidoptera
- Family: Geometridae
- Subfamily: Ennominae
- Genus: Carpella; Walker, [1865]

Genus of moths

Carpella is a genus of moths in the family Geometridae.

== Species ==
- Carpella aequidistans Thierry-Mieg, 1893
- Carpella districta Walker, [1865]
- Carpella innotata Warren, 1894
- Carpella semigrisea (Thierry-Mieg, 1892)
