= Charca =

Scientific classification
- Domain: Eukaryota
- Kingdom: Animalia
- Phylum: Arthropoda
- Class: Insecta
- Order: Lepidoptera
- Family: Geometridae
- Tribe: Odontoperini
- Genus: Charca; Rindge, 1983

Genus of moths

Charca is a genus of moths in the family Geometridae.
