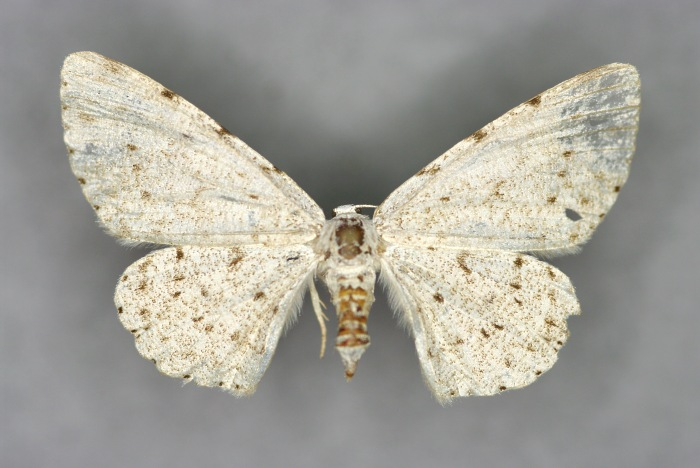
- Colocleora proximaria

Scientific classification
- Kingdom: Animalia
- Phylum: Arthropoda
- Clade: Pancrustacea
- Class: Insecta
- Order: Lepidoptera
- Family: Geometridae
- Tribe: Boarmiini
- Genus: Colocleora; Prout, 1938

= Colocleora =

Genus of moths

Colocleora is a genus of moths in the family Geometridae. It was described by Louis Beethoven Prout in 1938.

== Species ==
Some species of this genus are:

- Colocleora abdicata Herbulot, 1975
- Colocleora acharis Herbulot, 1962
- Colocleora albicurvata (Bastelberger, 1909)
- Colocleora anisoscia Prout, 1938
- Colocleora ankoleensis Carcasson, 1965
- Colocleora ansorgei (Warren, 1901)
- Colocleora bellula Prout, 1938
- Colocleora bergeri Herbulot, 1975
- Colocleora bilobata Herbulot, 1975
- Colocleora binoti Herbulot, 1983
- Colocleora bipannosa Prout, 1938
- Colocleora burgeoni (Prout, 1934)
- Colocleora calcarata Herbulot, 1972
- Colocleora catalai Prout, 1938
- Colocleora cellularis Herbulot, 1973
- Colocleora chrysomelas Viette, 1975
- Colocleora cinnamomoneura Prout, 1938
- Colocleora clarivenata (Prout, 1918)
- Colocleora clio Viette, 1974
- Colocleora collenettei Prout, 1938
- Colocleora comoraria (Oberthür, 1913)
- Colocleora delos Viette, 1974
- Colocleora derennei Herbulot, 1975
- Colocleora dichroma Herbulot, 1978
- Colocleora disgrega Prout, 1938
- Colocleora divisaria (Walker, 1860)
- Colocleora ducleri Herbulot, 1983
- Colocleora erato Viette, 1974
- Colocleora euplates (Prout, 1925)
- Colocleora euterpe Viette, 1974
- Colocleora expansa (Warren, 1899)
- Colocleora faceta (Prout, 1934)
- Colocleora grisea (Janse, 1932)
- Colocleora hegemonica (Prout, 1932)
- Colocleora herbuloti Viette, 1974
- Colocleora inaequivalis Herbulot, 1987
- Colocleora indivisa (Prout, 1927)
- Colocleora ingloriosa Herbulot, 1997
- Colocleora lambillioni Herbulot, 1975
- Colocleora leucostephana Prout, 1938
- Colocleora linearis Herbulot, 1985
- Colocleora malvina Herbulot, 1982
- Colocleora melancheima Prout, 1938
- Colocleora monogrammaria (Mabille, 1890)
- Colocleora nampouinei Viette, 1974
- Colocleora oncera Prout, 1938
- Colocleora opisthommata Prout, 1938
- Colocleora orthogonalis Viette, 1974
- Colocleora perpectinata Prout, 1938
- Colocleora poliophasma D. S. Fletcher, 1958
- Colocleora polyplanes Prout, 1938
- Colocleora polysemna Prout, 1938
- Colocleora potaenia (Prout, 1915)
- Colocleora probola Prout, 1938
- Colocleora prona Prout, 1938
- Colocleora proximaria (Walker, 1860)
- Colocleora ramosa Herbulot, 1973
- Colocleora refulgens (Herbulot, 1965)
- Colocleora sanghana Herbulot, 1985
- Colocleora sciabola Prout, 1938
- Colocleora simulatrix (Warren, 1899)
- Colocleora smithi (Warren, 1904)
- Colocleora splendens Herbulot, 1954
- Colocleora spuria (Prout, 1915)
- Colocleora suffumosa Prout, 1938
- Colocleora thalie Viette, 1974
- Colocleora turlini Herbulot, 1982
- Colocleora umbrata Prout, 1938
