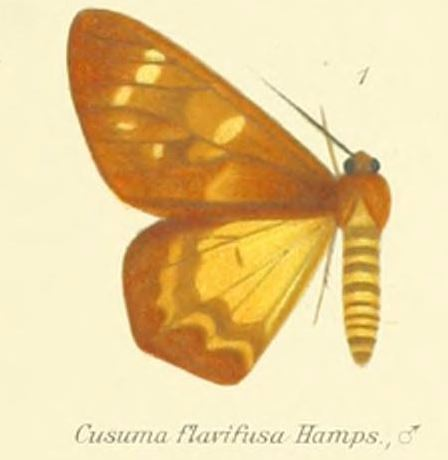
- Cusuma flavifusa

Scientific classification
- Kingdom: Animalia
- Phylum: Arthropoda
- Class: Insecta
- Order: Lepidoptera
- Family: Geometridae
- Subfamily: Geometrinae
- Genus: Cusuma; Moore, 1879

= Cusuma =

Genus of moths

Cusuma is a genus of moths in the family Geometridae.

== Species ==
- Cusuma flavifusa Hampson, 1893
- Cusuma limbata Moore, 1879
- Cusuma vilis (Walker, 1854)
