= Crypsicrocis =

Scientific classification
- Kingdom: Animalia
- Phylum: Arthropoda
- Class: Insecta
- Order: Lepidoptera
- Family: Geometridae
- Subfamily: Ennominae
- Genus: Crypsicrocis

Genus of moths

Crypsicrocis is a genus of moths in the family Geometridae.
