= Chloractis =

Scientific classification
- Kingdom: Animalia
- Phylum: Arthropoda
- Class: Insecta
- Order: Lepidoptera
- Family: Geometridae
- Subfamily: Geometrinae
- Genus: Chloractis; Warren, 1895

Genus of moths

Chloractis is a genus of moths in the family Geometridae.

== Species ==
- Chloractis pulcherrima (Butler, 1881)
