= Costignophos =

Scientific classification
- Kingdom: Animalia
- Phylum: Arthropoda
- Clade: Pancrustacea
- Class: Insecta
- Order: Lepidoptera
- Family: Geometridae
- Tribe: Gnophini
- Genus: Costignophos; Wehrli, 1951

Genus of moths

Costignophos or Charissa (Costignophos) is a genus or subgenus of moth in the family Geometridae.

== Selected species ==
- Costignophos avilarius
- Costignophos crenulata
- Costignophos italohelveticus
- Costignophos pullata
