= Coelocrossa =

Scientific classification
- Kingdom: Animalia
- Phylum: Arthropoda
- Class: Insecta
- Order: Lepidoptera
- Family: Geometridae
- Subfamily: Ennominae
- Genus: Coelocrossa; Turner, 1919

Genus of moths

Coelocrossa is a genus of moths in the family Geometridae.

== Species ==
- Coelocrossa drepanucha Turner, 1919
- Coelocrossa hypocrocea Turner, 1919
