= Conchylia =

Scientific classification
- Kingdom: Animalia
- Phylum: Arthropoda
- Class: Insecta
- Order: Lepidoptera
- Family: Geometridae
- Subfamily: Larentiinae
- Genus: Conchylia; Guenée in Boisduval & Guenée, 1857

Synonyms
- Callythria, Weymer, 1908

Genus of moths

Conchylia is a genus of moths in the family Geometridae.

== Species ==
- Conchylia actena Prout, 1917
- Conchylia albata Janse, 1934
- Conchylia alternata Warren, 1901
- Conchylia canescens Prout, 1925
- Conchylia decorata Warren, 1911
- Conchylia ditissimaria Guenée, 1858
- Conchylia frosinaria Stoll, 1790
- Conchylia gamma Prout, 1915
- Conchylia interstincta Prout, 1923
- Conchylia irene Prout, 1915
- Conchylia lamellata Prout, 1917
- Conchylia lapsicolumna Prout, 1916
- Conchylia nitidula Stoll, 1782
- Conchylia nymphula Janse, 1934
- Conchylia pactolaria Wallengren, 1872
- Conchylia rhabdocampa Prout, 1935
- Conchylia sesquifascia Prout, 1913
