= Catophoenissa =

Scientific classification
- Kingdom: Animalia
- Phylum: Arthropoda
- Class: Insecta
- Order: Lepidoptera
- Family: Geometridae
- Subfamily: Ennominae
- Genus: Catophoenissa; Warren, 1894

Genus of moths

Catophoenissa is a genus of moths in the family Geometridae.

== Species ==
- Catophoenissa baynei (Prout, 1910)
- Catophoenissa costiplaga (Prout, 1910)
- Catophoenissa dibapha (Felder & Rogenhofer, 1875)
