= Cnestrognophos =

Scientific classification
- Domain: Eukaryota
- Kingdom: Animalia
- Phylum: Arthropoda
- Class: Insecta
- Order: Lepidoptera
- Family: Geometridae
- Tribe: Gnophini
- Genus: Cnestrognophos

Genus of moths

Cnestrognophos is a genus of moth in the family Geometridae.

== Selected species ==
- Cnestrognophos mutilata
- Cnestrognophos pentheri
