= Carphoides =

Scientific classification
- Kingdom: Animalia
- Phylum: Arthropoda
- Class: Insecta
- Order: Lepidoptera
- Family: Geometridae
- Subfamily: Ennominae
- Genus: Carphoides; McDunnough, 1920

Genus of moths

Carphoides is a genus of moths in the family Geometridae.

== Species ==
- Carphoides inconspicuaria (Barnes & McDunnough, 1916)
- Carphoides incopriaria (Hulst, 1887)
- Carphoides setigera Rindge, 1958
