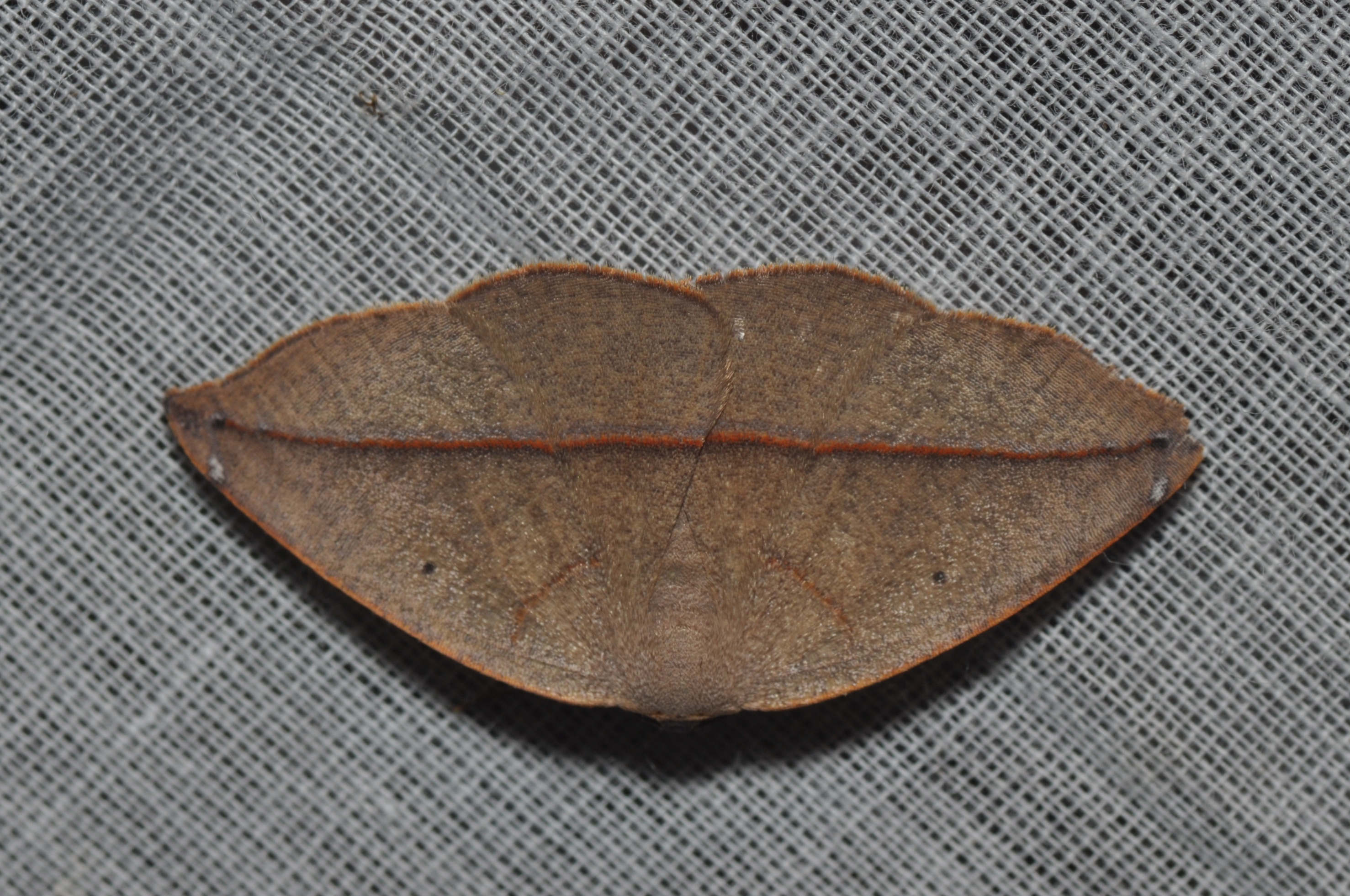

Scientific classification
- Kingdom: Animalia
- Phylum: Arthropoda
- Class: Insecta
- Order: Lepidoptera
- Family: Geometridae
- Subfamily: Ennominae
- Genus: Certima; Walker, 1860

Species
- C. discrepans Herbulot, 1986

= Certima =

Genus of moths

Certima is a genus of moths in the family Geometridae.
