= Chlorodrepana =

Scientific classification
- Kingdom: Animalia
- Phylum: Arthropoda
- Class: Insecta
- Order: Lepidoptera
- Family: Geometridae
- Subfamily: Geometrinae
- Genus: Chlorodrepana; Warren, 1899

Genus of moths

Chlorodrepana is a genus of moths in the family Geometridae.

== Species ==
- Chlorodrepana allevata Prout, 1915
- Chlorodrepana rothi Warren, 1899
