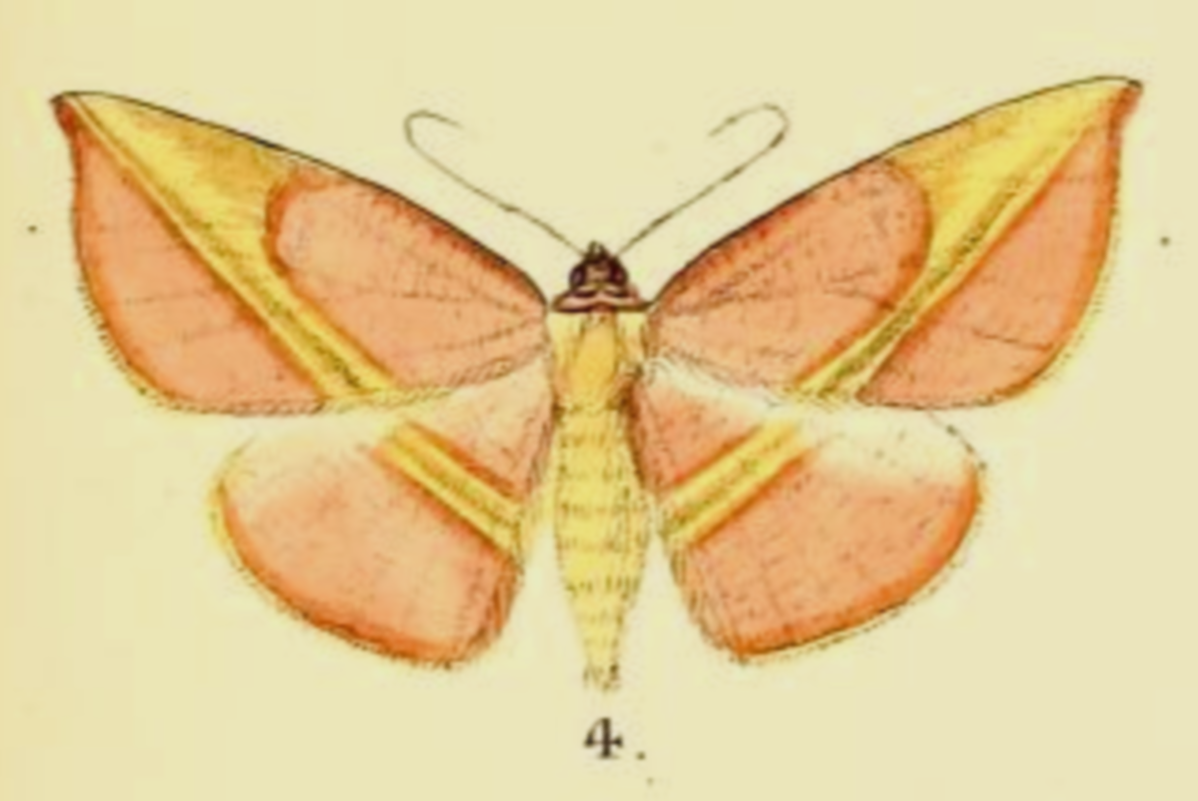
- Cimicodes sanguiflua

Scientific classification
- Kingdom: Animalia
- Phylum: Arthropoda
- Class: Insecta
- Order: Lepidoptera
- Family: Geometridae
- Subfamily: Ennominae
- Genus: Cimicodes; Guenée, [1858]

= Cimicodes =

Genus of moths

Cimicodes is a genus of moths in the family Geometridae. It has totally 13 species.

== List of species ==
- Cimicodes albicosta
- Cimicodes angustipennis
- Cimicodes clisthena
- Cimicodes clisthenata
- Cimicodes ferruginea
- Cimicodes latata
- Cimicodes manoaria
- Cimicodes nigroliturata
- Cimicodes pallicostata
- Cimicodes purpurea
- Cimicodes ruptimacula
- Cimicodes sanguiflua
- Cimicodes subapicata
