= Cheteoscelis =

Scientific classification
- Kingdom: Animalia
- Phylum: Arthropoda
- Clade: Pancrustacea
- Class: Insecta
- Order: Lepidoptera
- Family: Geometridae
- Subfamily: Geometrinae
- Genus: Cheteoscelis; Prout, 1912

Genus of moths

Cheteoscelis is a genus of moths in the family Geometridae.

== Species ==
- Cheteoscelis bistriaria (Packard, 1876)
- Cheteoscelis faseolaria (Guenée, 1857)
- Cheteoscelis graefiaria (Hulst, 1886)
- Cheteoscelis naenia Druce
- Cheteoscelis orthogramma Dyar
- Cheteoscelis pectinaria (Grossbeck, 1910)
