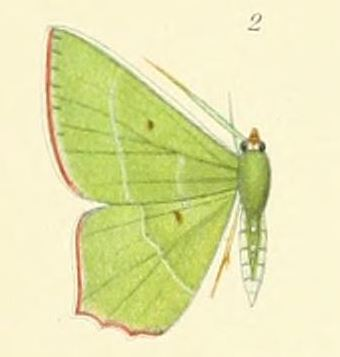
- Chrysochloroma megaloptera

Scientific classification
- Kingdom: Animalia
- Phylum: Arthropoda
- Class: Insecta
- Order: Lepidoptera
- Family: Geometridae
- Subfamily: Geometrinae
- Genus: Chrysochloroma; Warren, 1896

= Chrysochloroma =

Genus of moths

Chrysochloroma is a genus of moths in the family Geometridae.

== Species ==
- Chrysochloroma megaloptera (Lower, 1894)
