= Cypra =

Scientific classification
- Kingdom: Animalia
- Phylum: Arthropoda
- Class: Insecta
- Order: Lepidoptera
- Family: Geometridae
- Subfamily: Ennominae
- Genus: Cypra; Boisduval, 1832

Genus of moths

Cypra is a genus of moths in the family Geometridae.

== Species ==
- Cypra delicatula Boisduval, 1832
