= Capasa =

Scientific classification
- Kingdom: Animalia
- Phylum: Arthropoda
- Clade: Pancrustacea
- Class: Insecta
- Order: Lepidoptera
- Family: Geometridae
- Subfamily: Ennominae
- Genus: Capasa; Walker, 1866

Genus of moths

Capasa is a genus of moths in the family Geometridae.

== Species ==
- Capasa abstractaria (Walker, 1862)
- Capasa festivaria (Fabricius, 1794)
- Capasa flavifusata (Moore, 1887)
- Capasa hyadaria (Guenée, 1858)
- Capasa incensata (Walker, [1863])
- Capasa iris (Butler, 1880)
- Capasa lycoraria (Guenée, 1858)
- Capasa muscicolor Warren, 1893)
- Capasa nundata (Felder, 1875)
- Capasa pachiaria (Walker, 1860)
- Capasa pulchraria (Rothschild, 1894)
- Capasa pyrrhularia (Guenée, 1857)
- Capasa quadraria Warren, 1893)
- Capasa recensata (Prout, 1925)
- Capasa rufescens (Butler, 1886)
- Capasa sternaria (Guenée, 1857)
- Capasa venusa (Swinhoe, 1894)
