= Craspediopsis =

Scientific classification
- Kingdom: Animalia
- Phylum: Arthropoda
- Class: Insecta
- Order: Lepidoptera
- Family: Geometridae
- Subfamily: Sterrhinae
- Genus: Craspediopsis; Warren, 1895

Genus of moths

Craspediopsis is a genus of moths in the family Geometridae.

== Species ==
- Craspediopsis bimaculata Warren, 1895
- Craspediopsis pallivittata (Moore, [1868])
