= Chloroteras =

Scientific classification
- Kingdom: Animalia
- Phylum: Arthropoda
- Class: Insecta
- Order: Lepidoptera
- Family: Geometridae
- Subfamily: Geometrinae
- Genus: Chloroteras

Genus of moths

Chloroteras is a genus of moths in the family Geometridae.
