= Cosmogonia =

Scientific classification
- Kingdom: Animalia
- Phylum: Arthropoda
- Class: Insecta
- Order: Lepidoptera
- Family: Geometridae
- Subfamily: Geometrinae
- Genus: Cosmogonia; Warren, 1897

Genus of moths

Cosmogonia is a genus of moths in the family Geometridae.

== Species ==
- Cosmogonia decorata (Warren, 1896)
