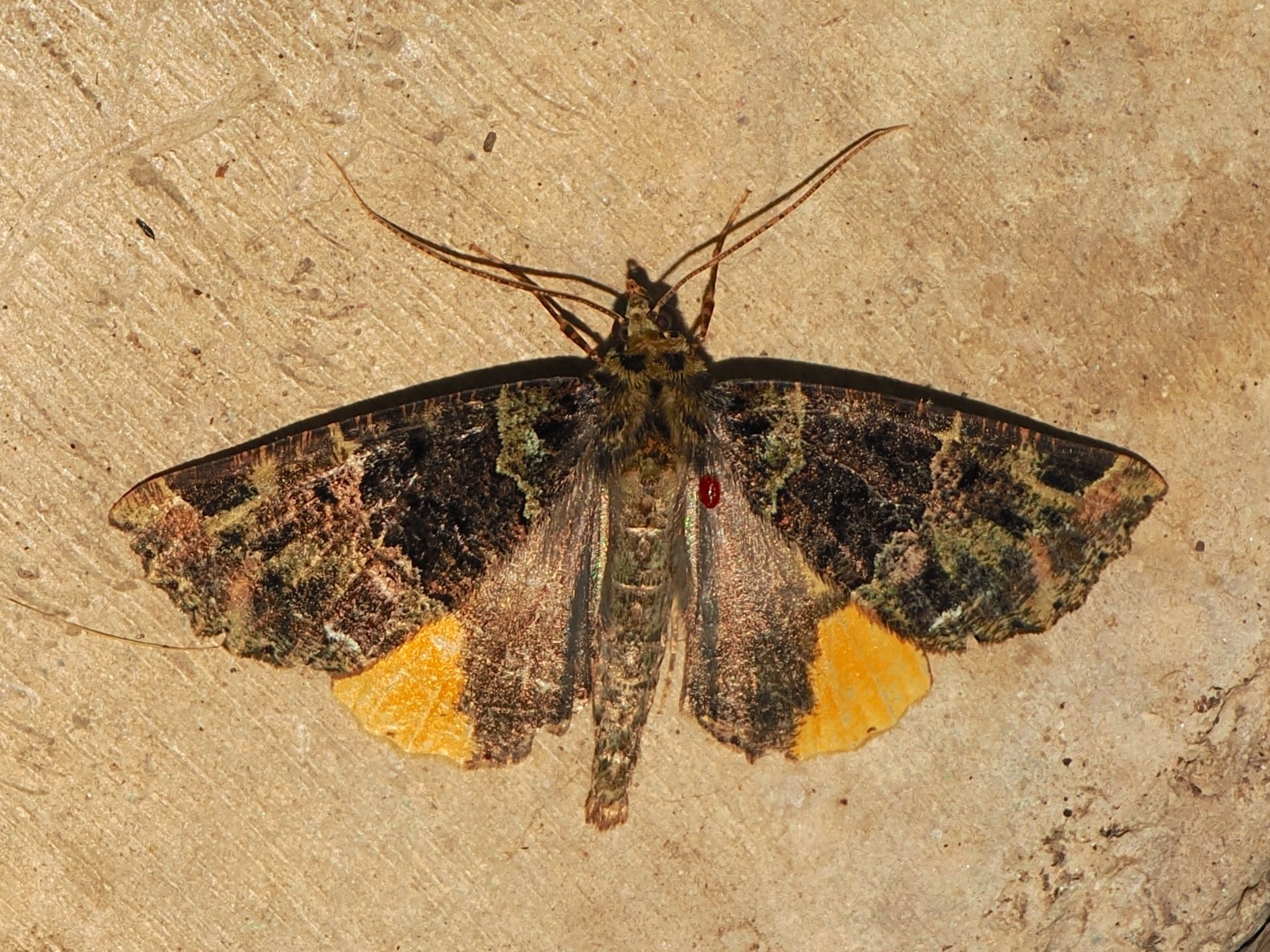

Scientific classification
- Kingdom: Animalia
- Phylum: Arthropoda
- Class: Insecta
- Order: Lepidoptera
- Family: Geometridae
- Genus: Chrysomima; Warren, 1894
- Species: C. semilutearia

Binomial name
- Chrysomima semilutearia (Felder & Rogenhofer, 1875)

= Chrysomima =

Chrysomima semilutearia

Genus of moths

Chrysomima is a genus of moths in the family Geometridae. It is monotypic, being represented by the single species Chrysomima semilutearia.
