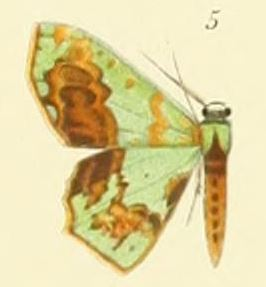
- Chloromianta ferruginata

Scientific classification
- Kingdom: Animalia
- Phylum: Arthropoda
- Class: Insecta
- Order: Lepidoptera
- Family: Geometridae
- Subfamily: Geometrinae
- Genus: Chloromianta; Warren

= Chloromianta =

Genus of moths

Chloromianta is a genus of moths in the family Geometridae.

== Species ==
- Chloromianta ferruginata Warren
- Chloromianta mianta (West)
