= Clepsiphron =

Scientific classification
- Kingdom: Animalia
- Phylum: Arthropoda
- Class: Insecta
- Order: Lepidoptera
- Family: Geometridae
- Subfamily: Ennominae
- Genus: Clepsiphron; Turner, 1922

Genus of moths

Clepsiphron is a genus of moths in the family Geometridae.

== Species ==
- Clepsiphron calycopis Turner, 1922
