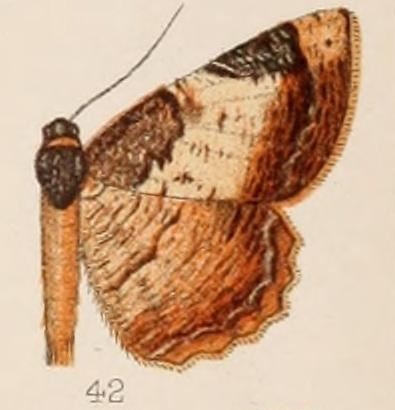

Scientific classification
- Kingdom: Animalia
- Phylum: Arthropoda
- Clade: Pancrustacea
- Class: Insecta
- Order: Lepidoptera
- Family: Geometridae
- Subfamily: Ennominae
- Genus: Cassephyra; Holloway, 1993

= Cassephyra =

Genus of moths

Cassephyra is a genus of moths in the family Geometridae.

== Species ==
- Cassephyra cyanosticta (Hampson, 1907)
- Cassephyra formosa (Debauche, 1941)
- Cassephyra lamprosticta (Hampson, 1895)
- Cassephyra plenimargo (Warren, 1903)
- Cassephyra triangulifera (Warren, 1898)
