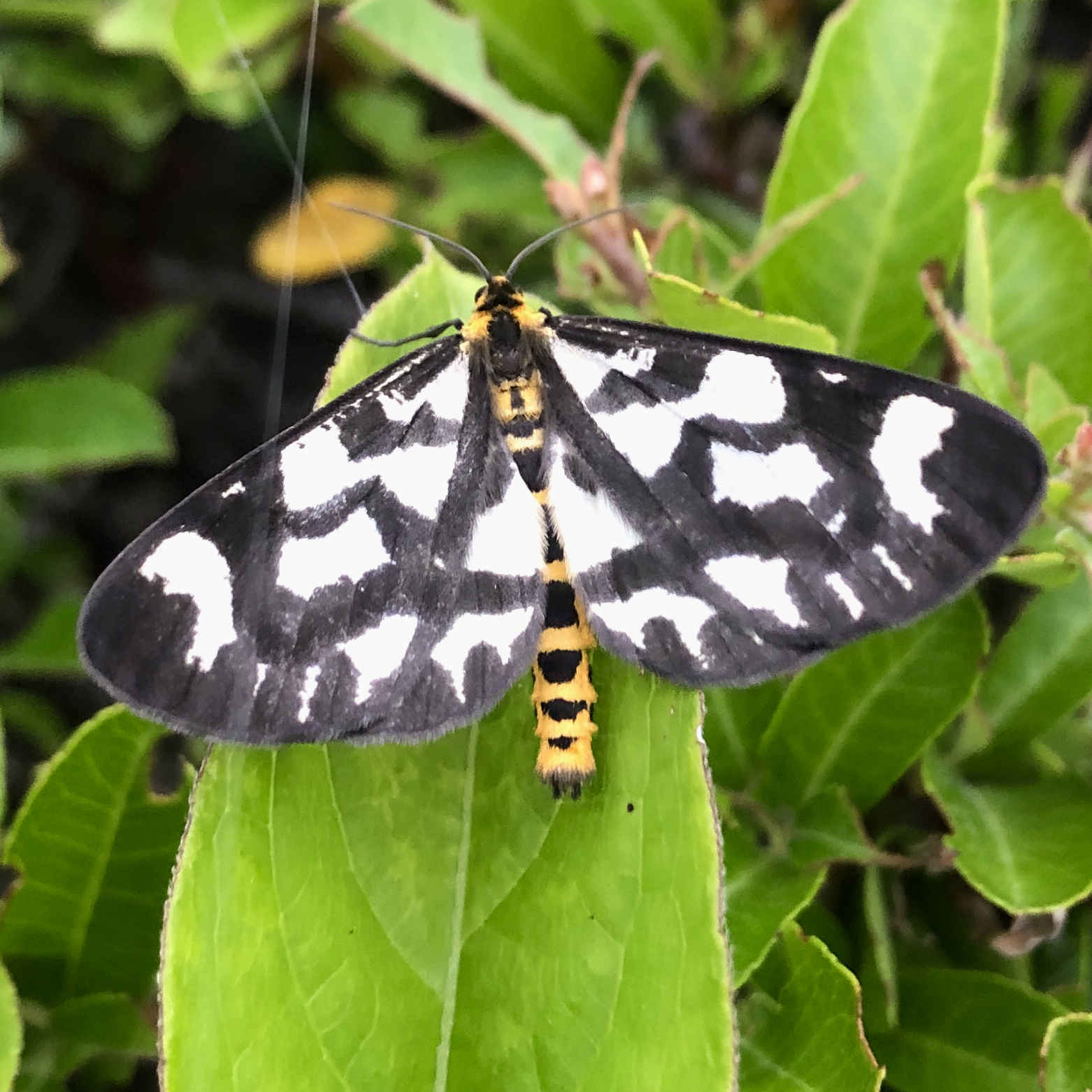
- Cystidia couaggaria

Scientific classification
- Kingdom: Animalia
- Phylum: Arthropoda
- Clade: Pancrustacea
- Class: Insecta
- Order: Lepidoptera
- Family: Geometridae
- Subfamily: Ennominae
- Genus: Cystidia; Hübner, [1819]

= Cystidia (moth) =

Genus of moths

Cystidia is a genus of moths in the family Geometridae.

== Species ==
- Cystidia couaggaria Guenée, 1857
- Cystidia indrasana (Moore, [1866])
- Cystidia stratonice (Stoll, [1782])
- Cystidia truncangulata Wehrli, 1934
