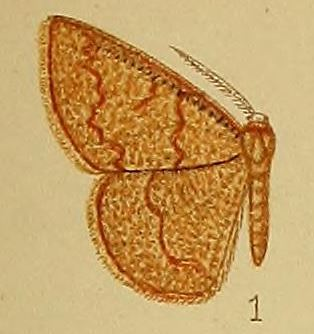

Scientific classification
- Kingdom: Animalia
- Phylum: Arthropoda
- Clade: Pancrustacea
- Class: Insecta
- Order: Lepidoptera
- Family: Geometridae
- Subfamily: Ennominae
- Genus: Cacostegania; Warren, 1901

Type species
- Cacostegania australis Warren, 1901

= Cacostegania =

Genus of moths

Cacostegania is a genus of moths in the family Geometridae discovered by William Warren in 1901.
