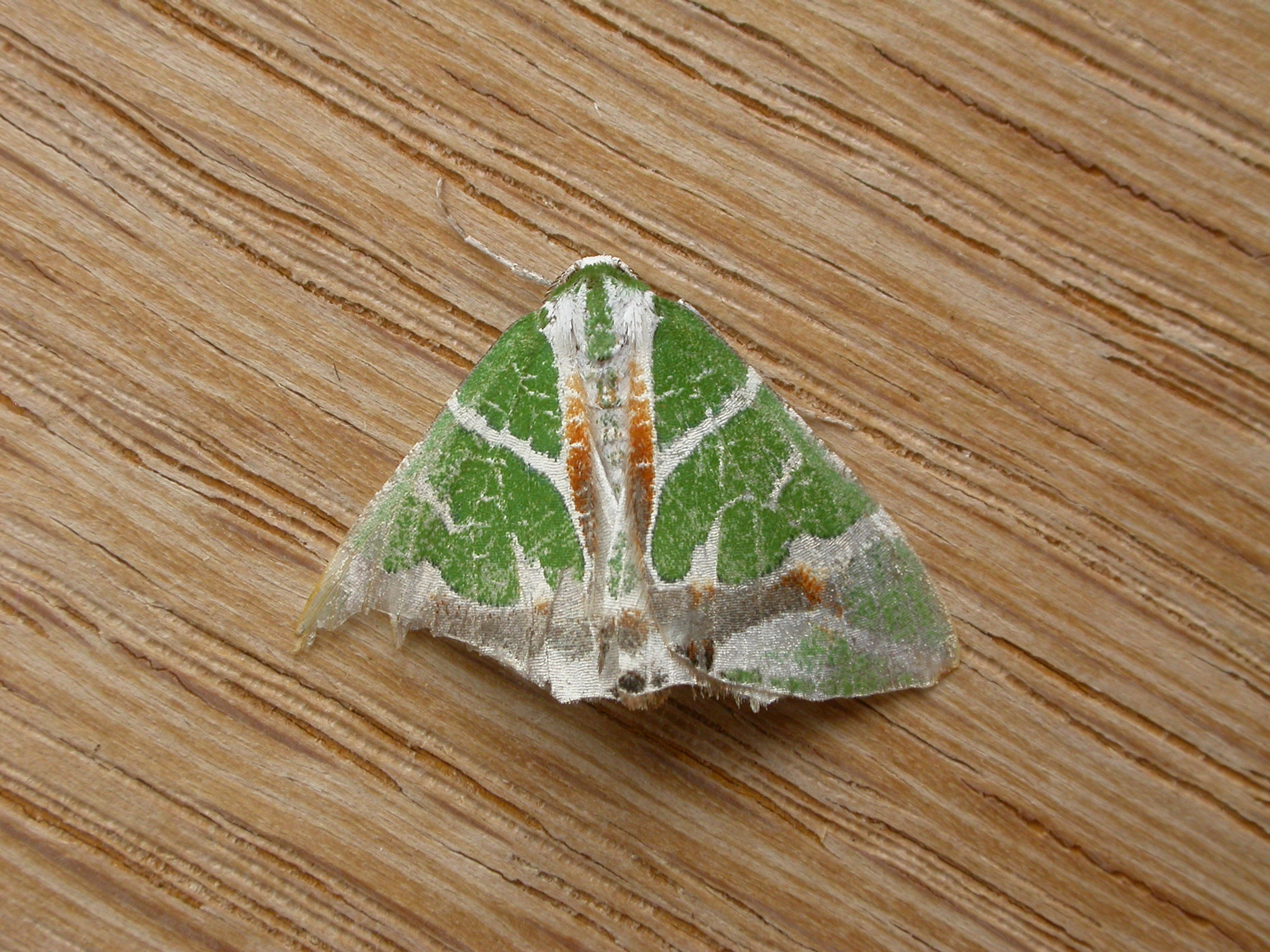
- Chlorodes boisduvalaria

Scientific classification
- Kingdom: Animalia
- Phylum: Arthropoda
- Clade: Pancrustacea
- Class: Insecta
- Order: Lepidoptera
- Family: Geometridae
- Subfamily: Geometrinae
- Genus: Chlorodes; Guenée, 1857
- Species: C. boisduvalaria

Binomial name
- Chlorodes boisduvalaria (Le Guillou, 1841)

Synonyms
- Geometra boisduvalaria Le Guillou, 1841; Chlorodes mirandaria Guenée, 1857

= Chlorodes =

Genus of moths

Chlorodes is a monotypic moth genus in the family Geometridae erected by Achille Guenée in 1857. Its only species, Chlorodes boisduvalaria, or Boisduval's emerald, first described by Élie Jean François Le Guillou in 1841, is known from Australia, including Tasmania.
