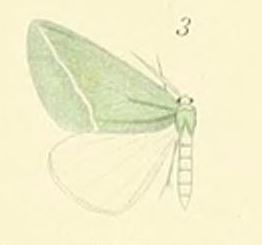
- Chlorosterrha semialba

Scientific classification
- Kingdom: Animalia
- Phylum: Arthropoda
- Clade: Pancrustacea
- Class: Insecta
- Order: Lepidoptera
- Family: Geometridae
- Subfamily: Geometrinae
- Genus: Chlorosterrha; Prout, 1912

= Chlorosterrha =

Genus of moths

Chlorosterrha is a genus of moths in the family Geometridae from Africa. The genus was erected by Louis Beethoven Prout in 1912. The species of this genus are known from Angola and South Africa.

== Species ==
- Chlorosterrha dichroma (Felder & Rogenhofer, 1875)
- Chlorosterrha monochroma L. B. Prout, 1912
- Chlorosterrha semialba (Swinhoe, 1906)

== Bibliography ==
- De Prins, J. & De Prins, W. (2018). "Chlorosterrha Prout, 1912". Afromoths.
