= Cheimoptena =

Scientific classification
- Kingdom: Animalia
- Phylum: Arthropoda
- Class: Insecta
- Order: Lepidoptera
- Family: Geometridae
- Subfamily: Ennominae
- Genus: Cheimoptena; Danilevsky, 1969

Genus of moths

Cheimoptena is a genus of moths in the family Geometridae.

== Species ==
- Cheimoptena pennigera Danilevsky, 1969
