= Chloromiza =

Scientific classification
- Kingdom: Animalia
- Phylum: Arthropoda
- Class: Insecta
- Order: Lepidoptera
- Family: Geometridae
- Subfamily: Ennominae
- Genus: Chloromiza

Genus of moths

Chloromiza is a genus of moth in the family Geometridae.
