= Cidariophanes =

Scientific classification
- Domain: Eukaryota
- Kingdom: Animalia
- Phylum: Arthropoda
- Class: Insecta
- Order: Lepidoptera
- Family: Geometridae
- Tribe: Odontoperini
- Genus: Cidariophanes; Warren, 1895

Synonyms
- Quillaca Rindge, 1983

Genus of moths

Cidariophanes is a genus of moths in the family Geometridae.
