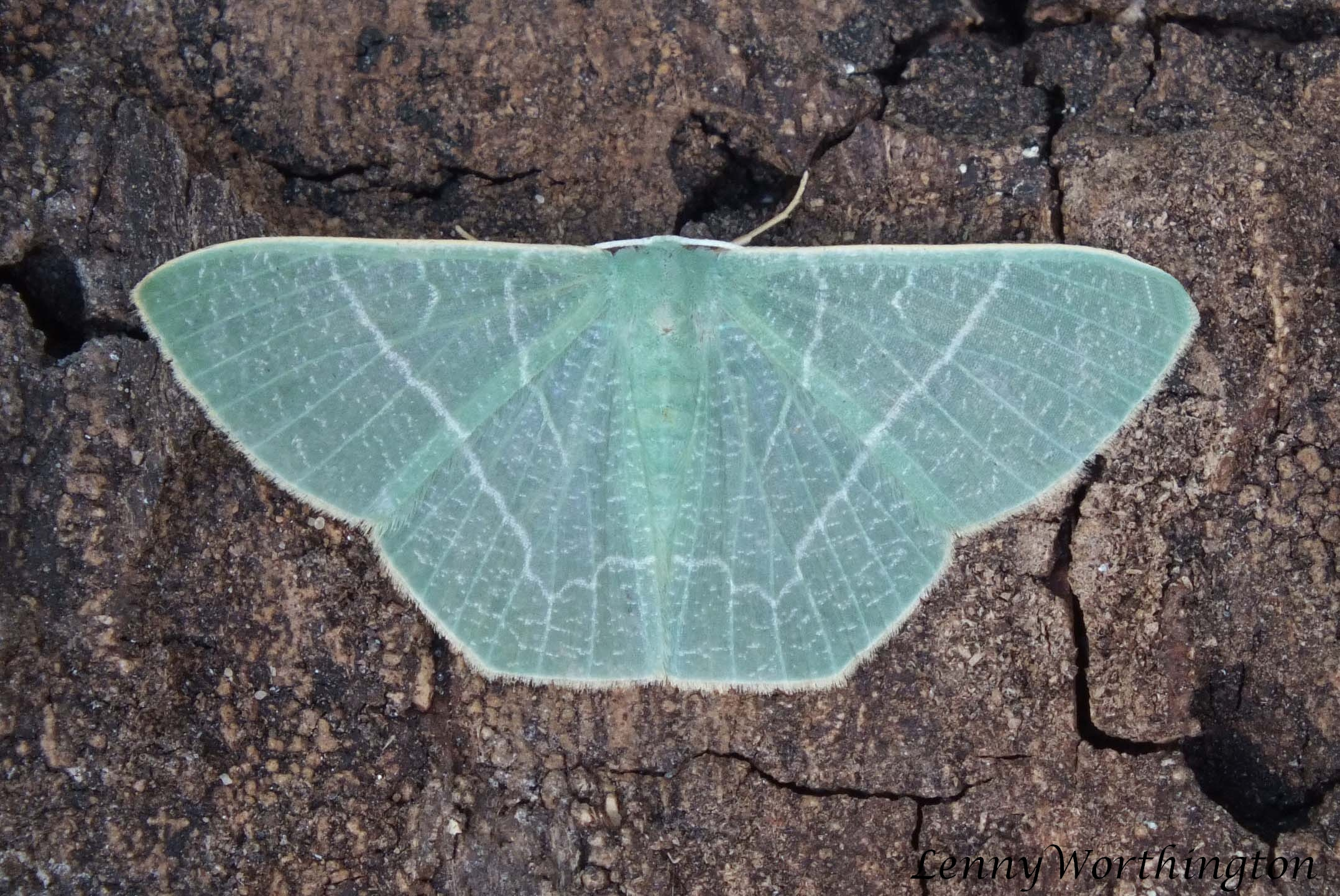

Scientific classification
- Kingdom: Animalia
- Phylum: Arthropoda
- Clade: Pancrustacea
- Class: Insecta
- Order: Lepidoptera
- Family: Geometridae
- Genus: Orothalassodes
- Species: O. falsaria

Binomial name
- Orothalassodes falsaria (Prout, 1912)

Synonyms
- Thalassodes falsaria Prout, 1912; Thalassodes falsarius; Pelagodes falsarius; Pelagodes falsaria; Thalassodes griseifimbria Prout, 1937

= Orothalassodes falsaria =

Species of moth

Orothalassodes falsaria is a species of moth of the family Geometridae. It is found in north-eastern India, Sri Lanka, China, Peninsular Malaysia, Sumatra, Borneo, Java and Bali. Records from Taiwan are misidentifications of Orothalassodes pervulgatus.

== Description ==
Antennae shaft brown, whereas rami greenish.

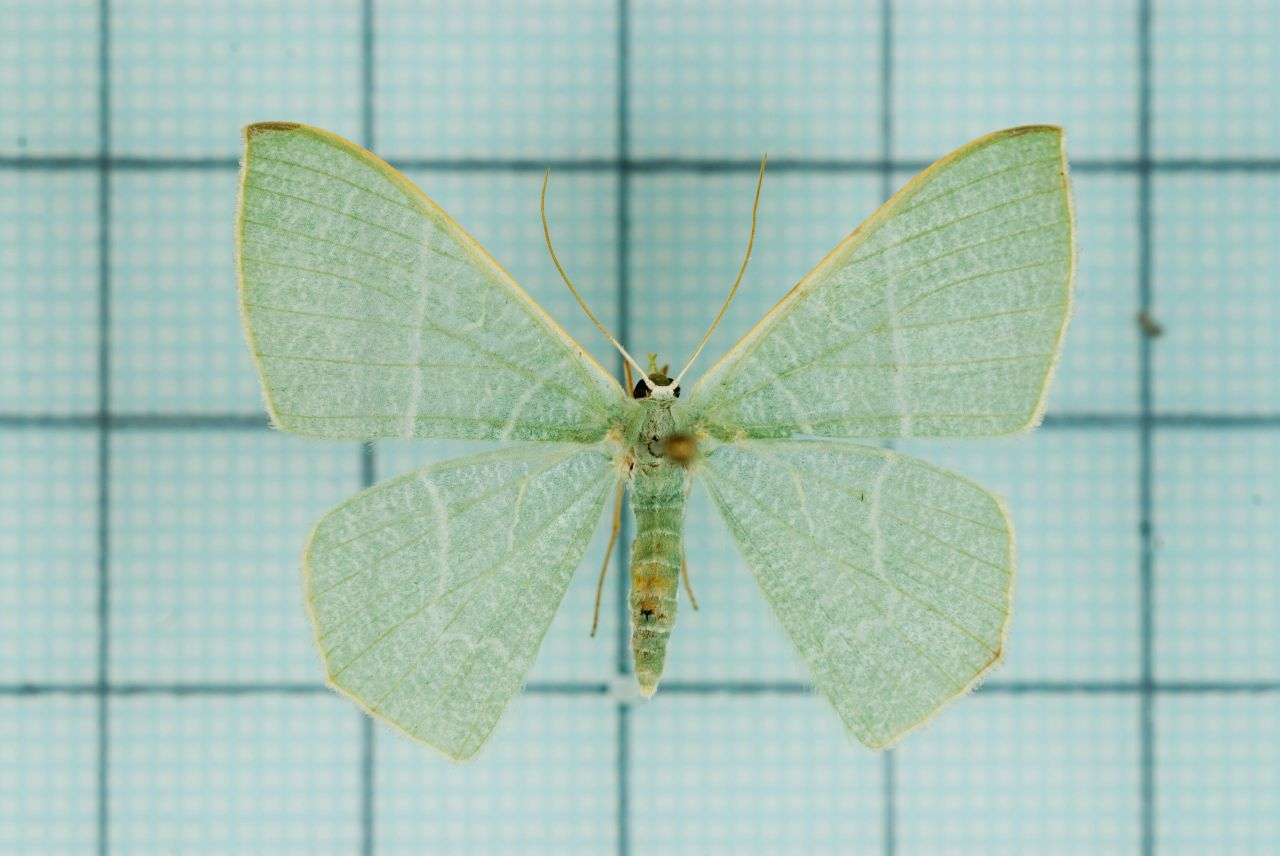
Orothalassodes pervulgatus, which was long thought to represent the same species as Orothalassodes falsaria
