= Xerochlora martinaria =

Scientific classification
- Kingdom: Animalia
- Phylum: Arthropoda
- Class: Insecta
- Order: Lepidoptera
- Family: Geometridae
- Tribe: Hemitheini
- Genus: Xerochlora
- Species: X. martinaria

Binomial name
- Xerochlora martinaria (Sperry, 1948)

Species of moth

Xerochlora martinaria is a species of emerald moth in the family Geometridae. It is found in North America.

The MONA or Hodges number for Xerochlora martinaria is 7080.
