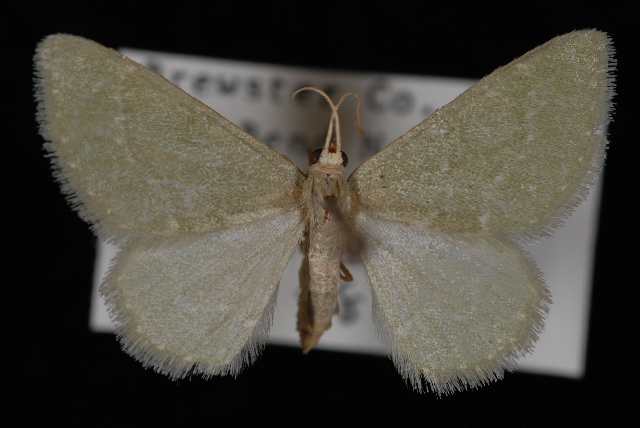

Scientific classification
- Kingdom: Animalia
- Phylum: Arthropoda
- Class: Insecta
- Order: Lepidoptera
- Family: Geometridae
- Tribe: Hemitheini
- Genus: Xerochlora
- Species: X. mesotheides

Binomial name
- Xerochlora mesotheides Ferguson, 1969

= Xerochlora mesotheides =

Species of moth

Xerochlora mesotheides is a species of emerald moth in the family Geometridae. It is found in Central America and North America.

The MONA or Hodges number for Xerochlora mesotheides is 7082.
