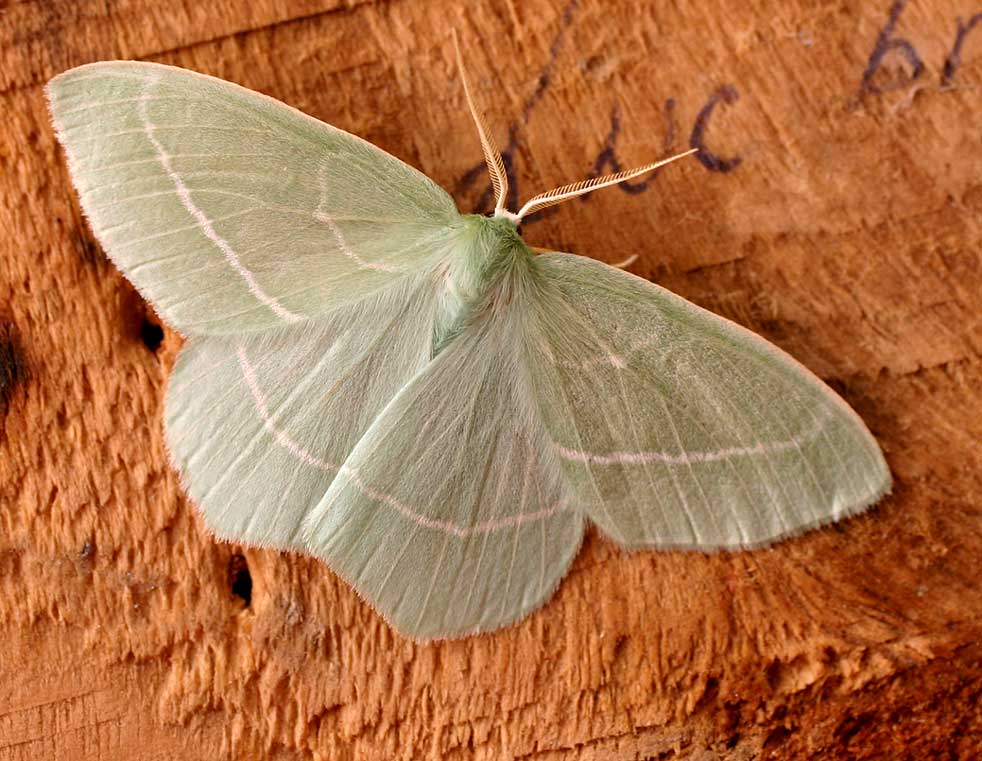
- Small emerald, Hemistola chrysoprasaria

Scientific classification
- Kingdom: Animalia
- Phylum: Arthropoda
- Class: Insecta
- Order: Lepidoptera
- Family: Geometridae
- Subfamily: Geometrinae
- Tribe: Hemitheini; Bruand, 1846

Genera
- Several, see text

Synonyms
- Chlorochromini Duponchel, 1845; Chlorochromites Duponchel, 1845; Comostolini Inoue, 1961; Hemistolini Inoue, 1961; Hemitheidae Bruand, 1846; Hemitheiti Bruand, 1846; Jodiini Inoue, 1961 (lapsus); Jodini Inoue, 1961; Microloxiini Hausmann, 1996; Thalassodini Inoue, 1961; Thalerini Herbulot, 1963; (but see text)

= Hemitheini =

Tribe of moths

Though small in absolute diversity of genera, the Hemitheini are nonetheless the largest tribes of geometer moths in the subfamily Geometrinae. Like most Geometrinae, they are small greenish "emerald moths". The tribe was first described by Charles Théophile Bruand d'Uzelle in 1846.

In some treatments the Comostolini, Hemistolini, Jodini, Microloxiini, Thalassodini and Thalerini are split off as independent tribes. But they are probably paraphyletic among themselves and with respect to the remaining Hemitheini. Consequently, until more information is available they are included in the Hemitheini here.

In other systems, the Geometrinae are defined in a more inclusive way; the Hemitheini are then ranked as a subtribe Hemitheiti.

== Selected genera and species ==
A few Geometrinae genera are not yet assigned to a tribe with certainty; some of them might belong here too.

- Albinospila - formerly in Prasinocyma
- Anoplosceles
- Aoshakuna Matsumura, 1925 - often included in Chlorissa; includes Nipponogelasma
- Aporandria
- Berta
- Chlorissa Stephens, 1831
- Chloristola
- Chlorochlamys Hulst, 1896
- Chloropteryx Hulst, 1896
- Culpinia Prout, 1912
- Comostola Meyrick, 1888
- Dyschloropsis Warren, 1895
- Episothalma
- Eretmopus
- Gelasma Warren, 1893
- Hemistola Warren, 1893
- Hemithea Duponchel, 1829
  - Common emerald, Hemithea aestivaria
- Hethemia Ferguson, 1969
- Idiochlora Warren, 1896
- Jodis Hübner, 1823
  - Jodis putata
- Maxates
- Mesothea Warren, 1901
- Microloxia Warren, 1893
- Mujiaoshakua Inoue, 1955
- Oenospila
- Olerospila
- Orothalassodes
- Pamphlebia
- Pelagodes
- Thalassodes
- Thalera Hübner, 1823
- Xerochlora Ferguson, 1969
