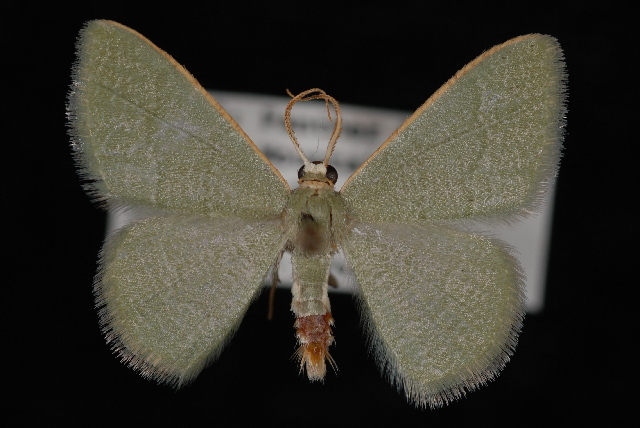

Scientific classification
- Kingdom: Animalia
- Phylum: Arthropoda
- Class: Insecta
- Order: Lepidoptera
- Family: Geometridae
- Tribe: Hemitheini
- Genus: Xerochlora
- Species: X. inveterascaria

Binomial name
- Xerochlora inveterascaria (Swett, 1907)

= Xerochlora inveterascaria =

Species of moth

Xerochlora inveterascaria is a species of emerald moth in the family Geometridae. It is found in North America.

The MONA or Hodges number for Xerochlora inveterascaria is 7079.
