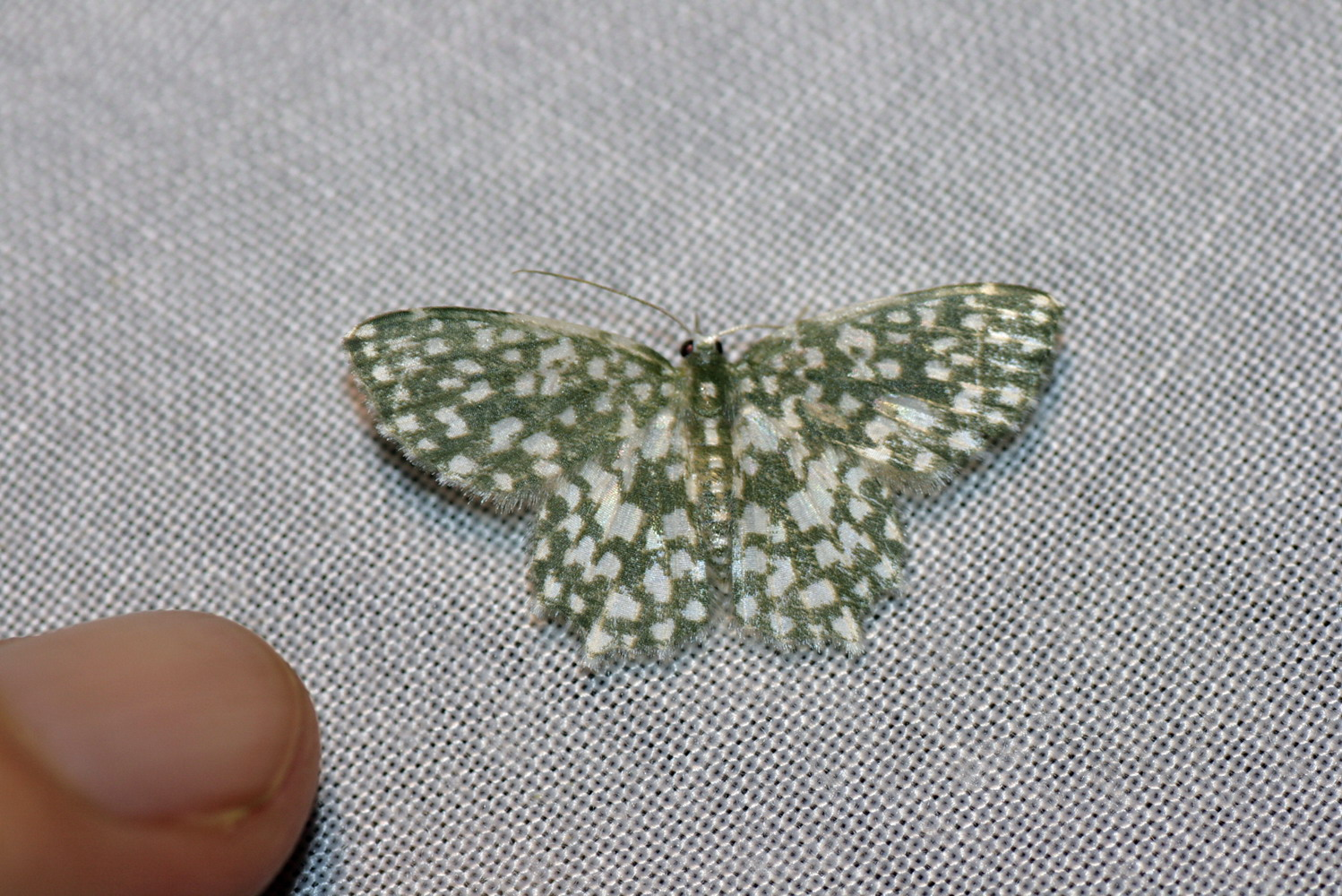
- Berta chrysolineata

Scientific classification
- Kingdom: Animalia
- Phylum: Arthropoda
- Class: Insecta
- Order: Lepidoptera
- Family: Geometridae
- Tribe: Hemitheini
- Genus: Berta; Walker, [1863]

= Berta (moth) =

Genus of moths

Berta is a genus of moths in the family Geometridae.

== Species ==
- Berta albiplaga Warren, 1893
- Berta annulifera Warren, 1896
- Berta anteplaga Prout, 1916
- Berta cercifera Holloway, 1996
- Berta chrysolineata Walker, [1863]
- Berta copiosa Prout, 1917
- Berta digitijuxta Holloway, 1996
- Berta hemisponsa Prout
- Berta philippina Prout, 1917
- Berta subrectistriga Prout
- Berta tridentijuxta Holloway, 1996
- Berta vaga (Walker, 1861)
- Berta zygophyxia Prout, 1912
