= Olerospila =

Scientific classification
- Kingdom: Animalia
- Phylum: Arthropoda
- Class: Insecta
- Order: Lepidoptera
- Family: Geometridae
- Tribe: Hemitheini
- Genus: Olerospila

Genus of moths

Olerospila is a genus of moths in the family Geometridae.
