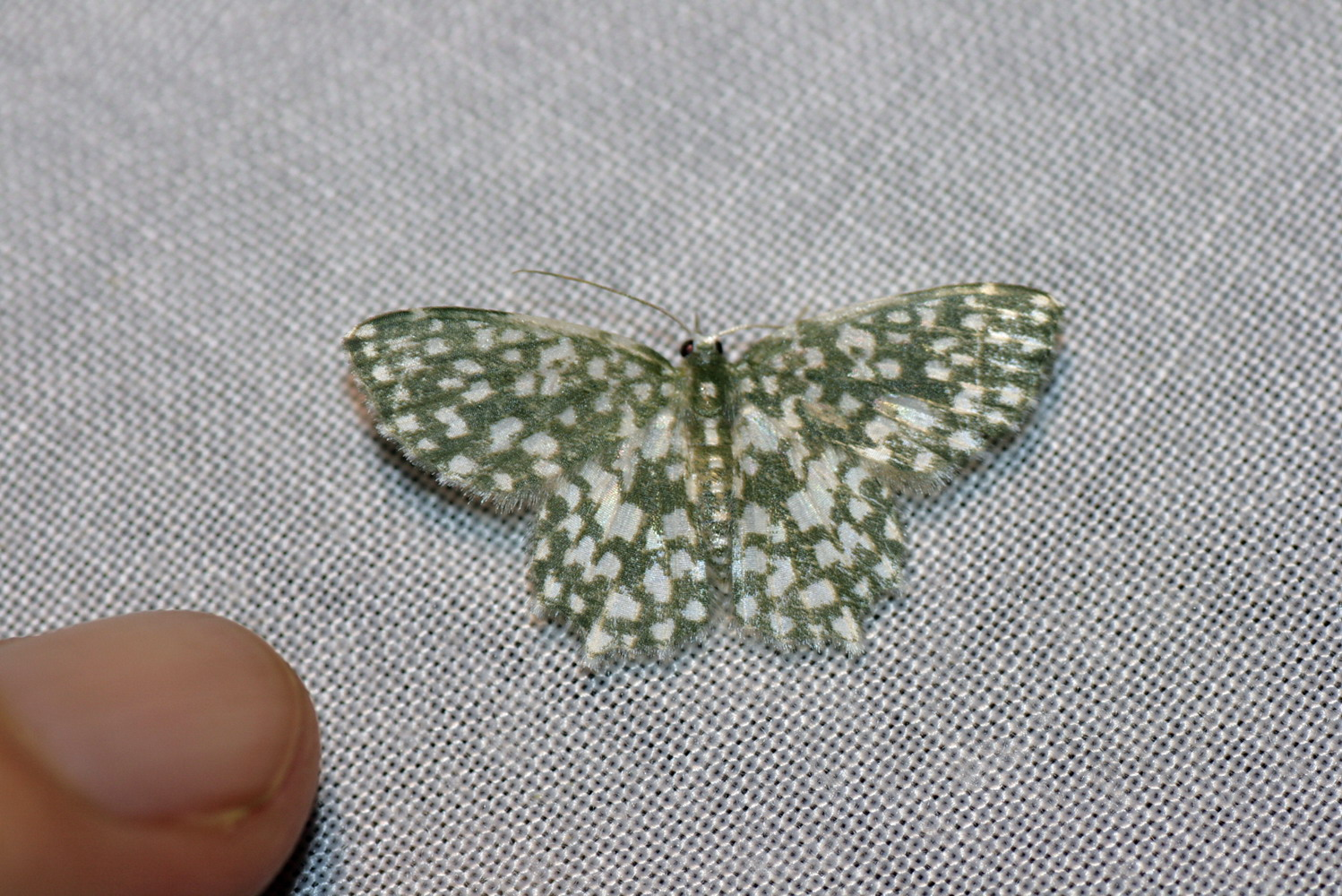

Scientific classification
- Kingdom: Animalia
- Phylum: Arthropoda
- Class: Insecta
- Order: Lepidoptera
- Family: Geometridae
- Genus: Berta
- Species: B. chrysolineata

Binomial name
- Berta chrysolineata Walker, [1863]

Synonyms
- Euchloris leucospilota Turner, 1904; Berta fenestrata Prout, 1913

= Berta chrysolineata =

Species of moth

Berta chrysolineata is a species of moth of the family Geometridae described by Francis Walker in 1863. It is widespread from the Indo-Australian tropics of India, Sri Lanka to the Solomons.

== Description ==
The wingspan is about 20–26 mm. Hindwings of male with the outer margin excised between veins 6 and 4. Veins 3 and 4 stalked. Hind tibia of the male dilated with a fold and tuft and two pairs on spurs. Hindwings of female excised. It is an olive-green moth with a rufous frons. Vertex of head whitish. Abdomen with white dorsal spots. Wings with many irregular white spots often conjoined into bands. Forewings with spots at base and end of cell. Antemedial, oblique medial, sinuous submarginal and almost marginal series of spots. Hindwings with spots on basal area and end of cell. A curved medial series, and sinuous postmedial and submarginal series. Ventral side white.

Larvae have been recorded on Ricinus communis. Other food plants may include Nephelium species.

== Subspecies ==
- Berta chrysolineata chrysolineata (Sri Lanka)
- Berta chrysolineata hainanensis Prout, 1912 (India to Seram and possibly New Guinea)
- Berta chrysolineata eccimena Prout, 1912 (Bismarck Islands)
- Berta chrysolineata leucospilota (Turner, 1904) (Australia)
- Berta chrysolineata fenestrata (Prout, 1913) (Solomon Islands)
