= Anoplosceles =

Scientific classification
- Kingdom: Animalia
- Phylum: Arthropoda
- Class: Insecta
- Order: Lepidoptera
- Family: Geometridae
- Tribe: Hemitheini
- Genus: Anoplosceles; Warren
- Species: A. nigripunctata

Binomial name
- Anoplosceles nigripunctata Warren, 1897

Monotypic genus of geometer moths

Anoplosceles is a monotypic moth genus in the family Geometridae. Its single species, Anoplosceles nigripunctata, is found in Java, Sumatra and Borneo. The species was first described by Warren in 1897.
