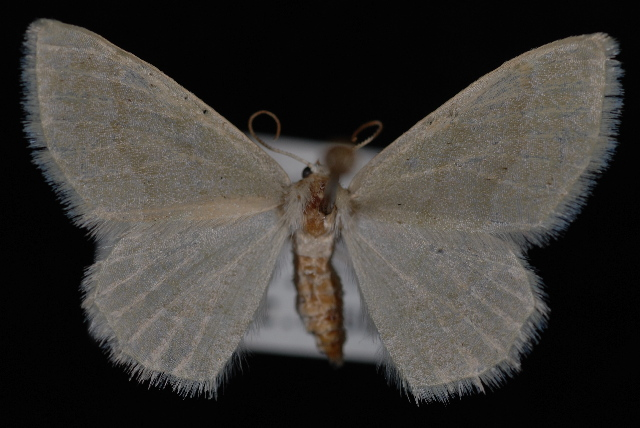
- Xerochlora viridipallens

Scientific classification
- Kingdom: Animalia
- Phylum: Arthropoda
- Class: Insecta
- Order: Lepidoptera
- Family: Geometridae
- Tribe: Hemitheini
- Genus: Xerochlora; Ferguson, 1969

= Xerochlora =

Genus of moths

Xerochlora is a genus of moths in the family Geometridae erected by Alexander Douglas Campbell Ferguson in 1969. All species are known from North America.

== Species ==
- Xerochlora viridipallens (Hulst, 1896) Colorado, New Mexico, Arizona, Texas, California
- Xerochlora inveterascaria (Swett, 1907) Arizona, Texas
- Xerochlora martinaria (Sperry, 1948) Arizona
- Xerochlora masonaria (Schaus, 1897) Arizona, New Mexico, Mexico, Guatemala, Costa Rica
- Xerochlora mesotheides Ferguson, 1969 Texas, New Mexico, Mexico
