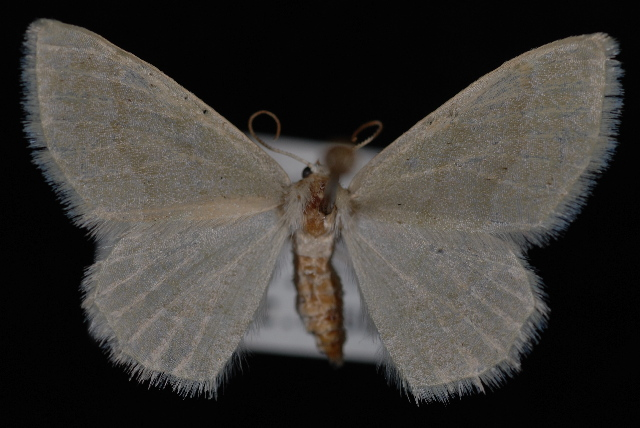

Scientific classification
- Kingdom: Animalia
- Phylum: Arthropoda
- Clade: Pancrustacea
- Class: Insecta
- Order: Lepidoptera
- Family: Geometridae
- Genus: Xerochlora
- Species: X. viridipallens

Binomial name
- Xerochlora viridipallens (Hulst, 1896)

= Xerochlora viridipallens =

Species of moth

Xerochlora viridipallens is a species of emerald moth in the family Geometridae. It is found in North America.
