= Dyschloropsis =

Scientific classification
- Kingdom: Animalia
- Phylum: Arthropoda
- Class: Insecta
- Order: Lepidoptera
- Family: Geometridae
- Tribe: Hemitheini
- Genus: Dyschloropsis; Warren, 1895

Genus of moths

Dyschloropsis is a genus of moths in the family Geometridae.

== Species ==
- Dyschloropsis impararia (Guenée, 1857)
