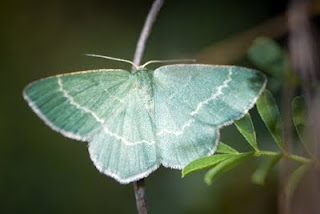

Scientific classification
- Kingdom: Animalia
- Phylum: Arthropoda
- Clade: Pancrustacea
- Class: Insecta
- Order: Lepidoptera
- Family: Geometridae
- Genus: Chlorissa
- Species: C. cloraria

Binomial name
- Chlorissa cloraria (Hübner, [1813])

Synonyms
- Geometra cloraria Hübner, [1813]; Geometra chlorata Treitschke, 1825; Geometra porrinata Zeller, 1848; Geometra porrinaria Heydenreich, 1851; Nemoria prasinata Walker, [1863]

= Chlorissa cloraria =

Southern grass emerald

Species of moth

Chlorissa cloraria, the southern grass emerald, is a species of moth in the family Geometridae. It is found in most of Europe, except Ireland, Great Britain, the Netherlands, Denmark and northern Russia.

The wingspan is 18–20 mm. Adults are on wing in May and June.

The larvae are polyphagous and feed on various trees, shrubs and low plants, including Corylus avellana and Crataegus species. Larvae can be found from June to September.
