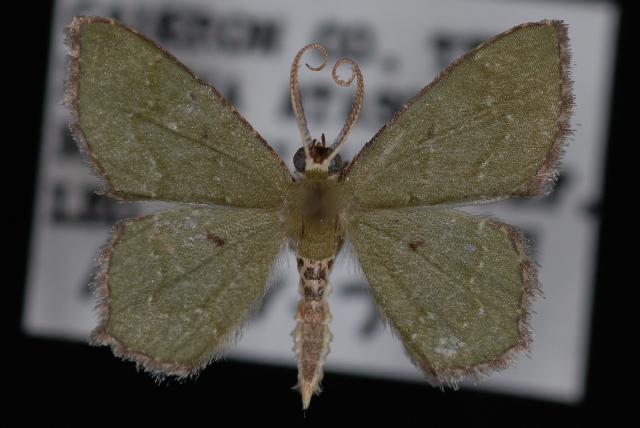

Scientific classification
- Kingdom: Animalia
- Phylum: Arthropoda
- Class: Insecta
- Order: Lepidoptera
- Family: Geometridae
- Genus: Chloropteryx
- Species: C. nordicaria

Binomial name
- Chloropteryx nordicaria (Schaus, 1901)

= Chloropteryx nordicaria =

Species of moth

Chloropteryx nordicaria is a species of emerald moth in the family Geometridae. It is found in Central America and North America.

The MONA or Hodges number for Chloropteryx nordicaria is 7076.
