= Oenospila kopperi =

Scientific classification
- Kingdom: Animalia
- Phylum: Arthropoda
- Class: Insecta
- Order: Lepidoptera
- Family: Geometridae
- Genus: Oenospila
- Species: O. kopperi

Binomial name
- Oenospila kopperi Hausmann & Sommerer, 2001

Species of moth

Oenospila kopperi is a moth species in the geometrid genus Oenospila. It is found on Sumatra in montane forests.

== Description ==
Oenospila kopperi has bright green wings, with a white costa on the forewing and a black triangular mark halfway on the inner margin of the hindwing. It has a wingspan of 26–29 mm. It is similar in external appearance to other species of genus Oenospila, several of which are similarly marked and of similar size, and can be reliably separated from these only by the male genitalia.
