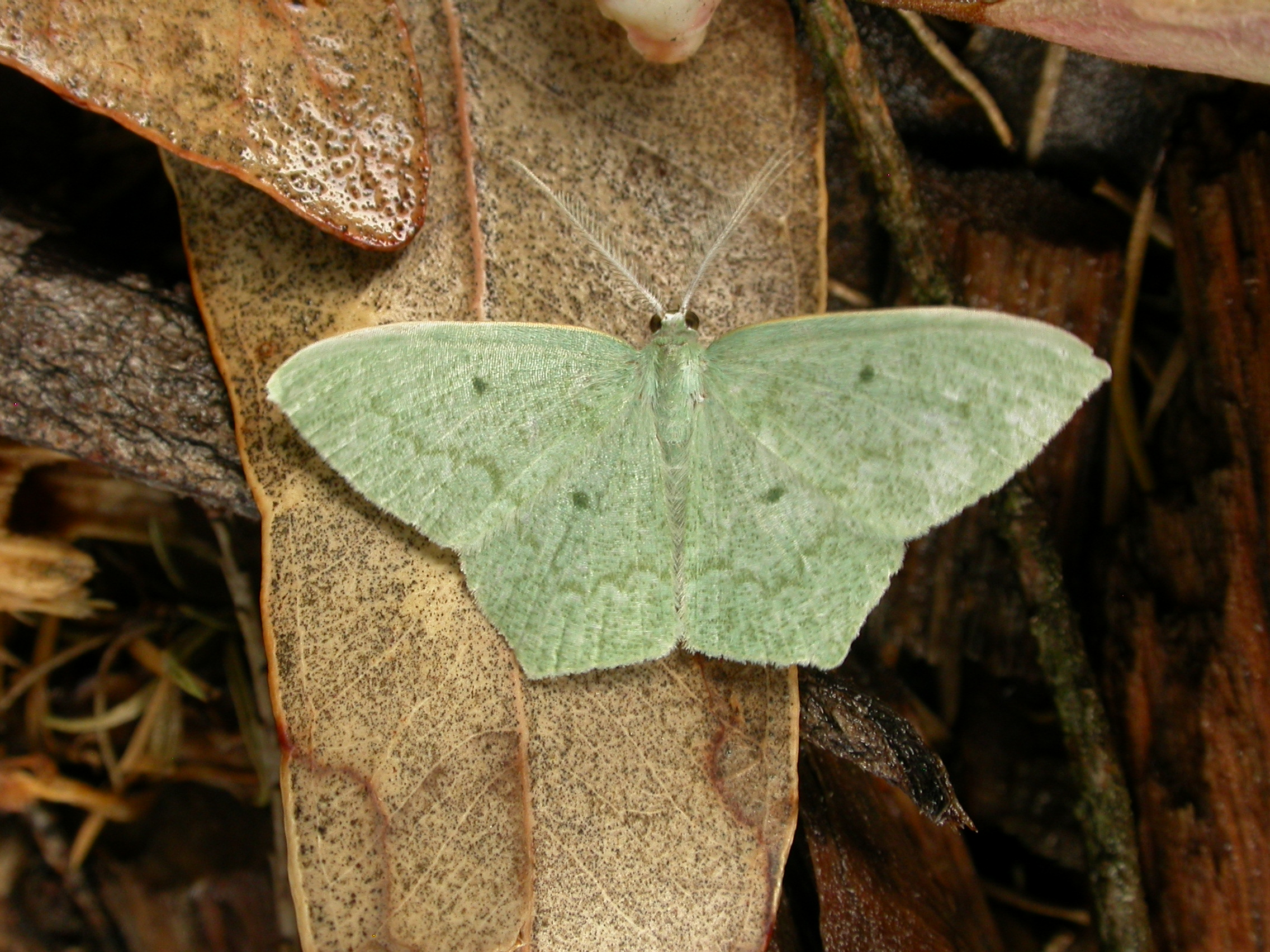

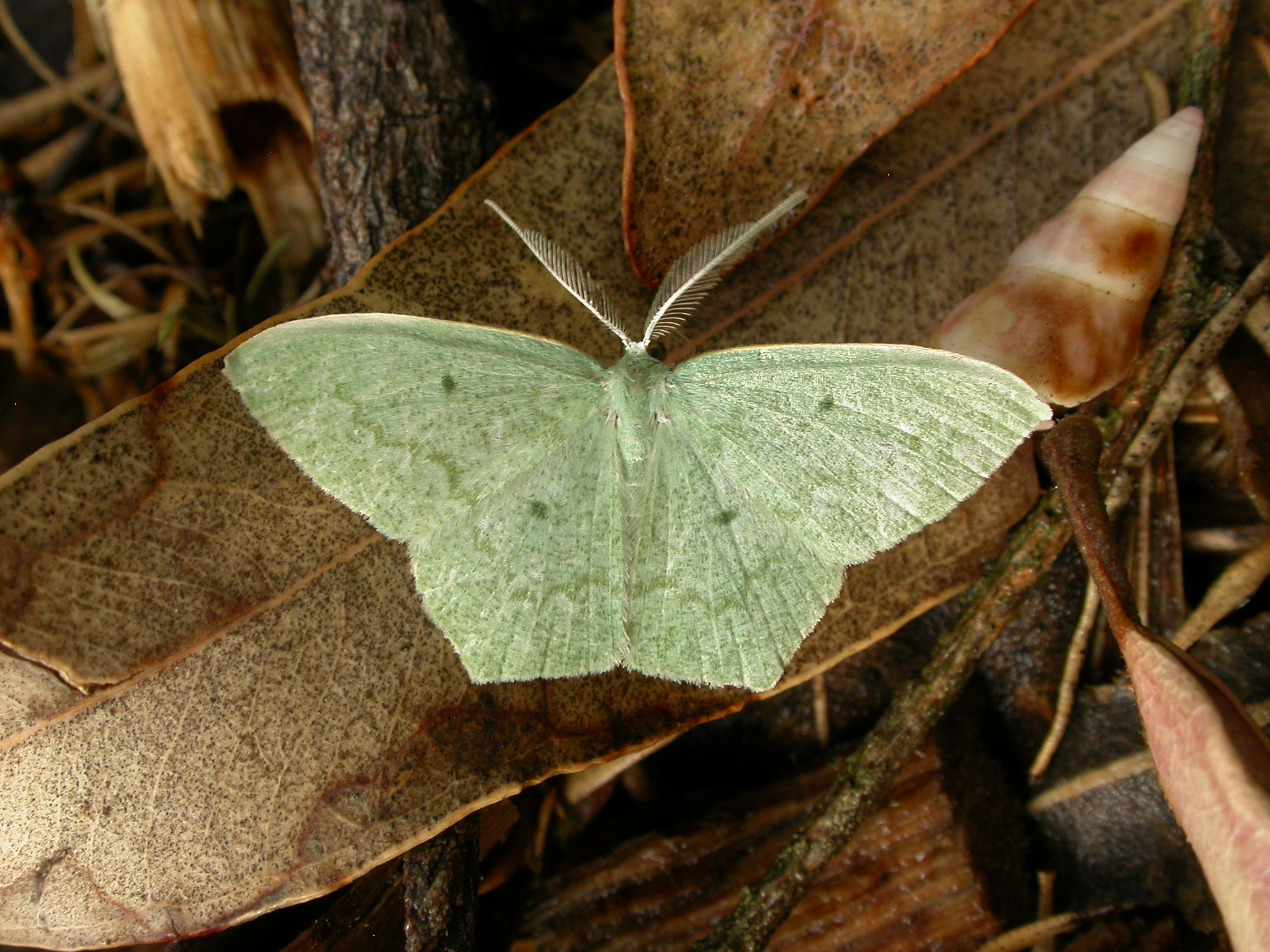

Scientific classification
- Kingdom: Animalia
- Phylum: Arthropoda
- Class: Insecta
- Order: Lepidoptera
- Family: Geometridae
- Genus: Maxates
- Species: M. centrophylla

Binomial name
- Maxates centrophylla (Meyrick, 1888)

Synonyms
- Iodis centrophylla Meyrick, 1888; Gelasma centrophylla

= Maxates centrophylla =

Species of moth

Maxates centrophylla is a moth of the family Geometridae. It is known from Australia, including Tasmania.

The larvae have been recorded feeding on Aotus ericoides.
