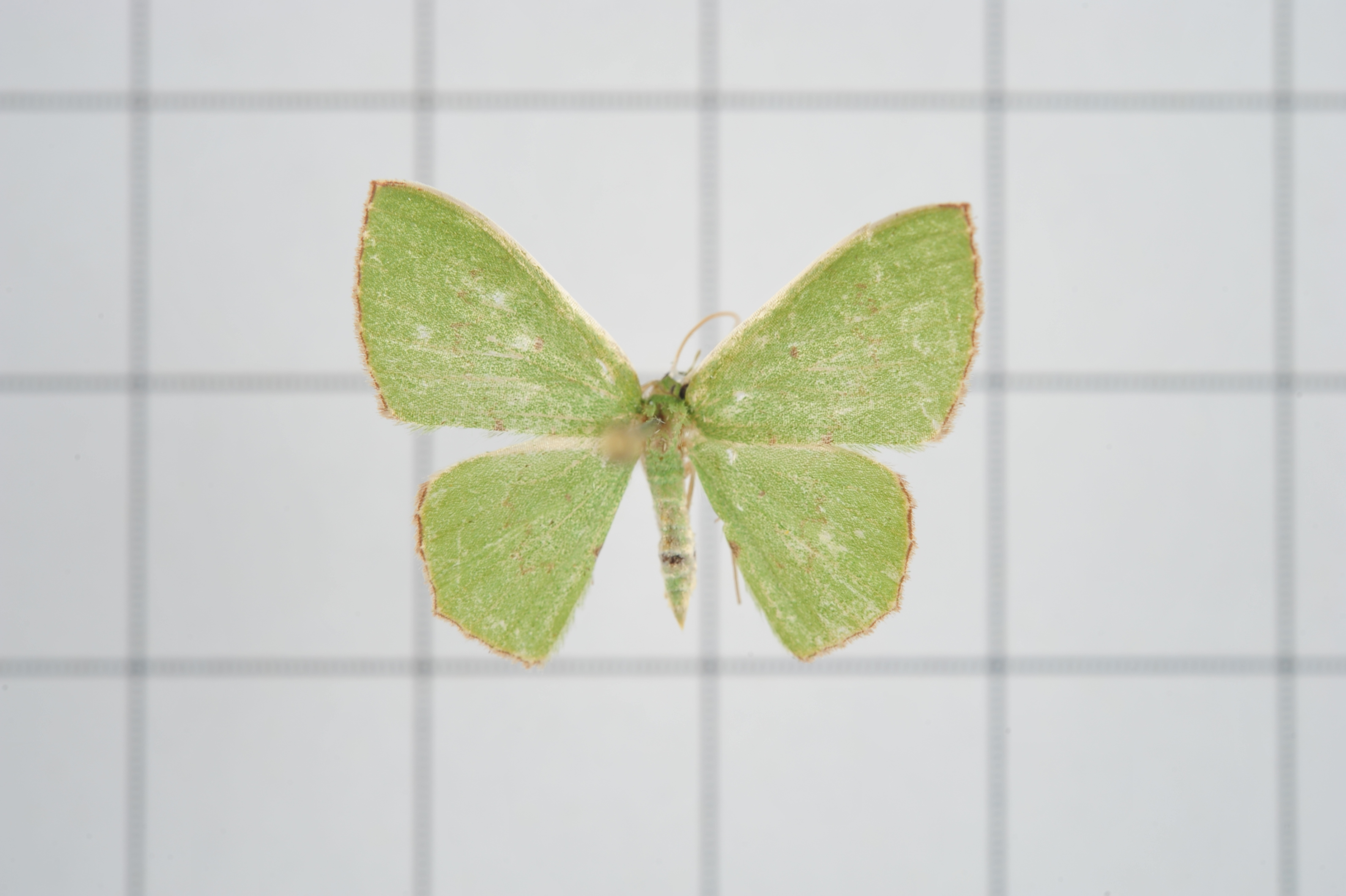

Scientific classification
- Kingdom: Animalia
- Phylum: Arthropoda
- Class: Insecta
- Order: Lepidoptera
- Family: Geometridae
- Genus: Oenospila
- Species: O. flavifusata

Binomial name
- Oenospila flavifusata (Walker, 1861)

Synonyms
- Thalera flavifusata Walker, 1861; Thalassodes sinuata Moore, 1867

= Oenospila flavifusata =

Species of moth

Oenospila flavifusata is a moth of the family Geometridae. It is found in Oriental tropics to Sundaland.

Generally a green colored moth. Costa whitish and dentate fasciae is dark. Caterpillar yellowish with a dorsal, slender, red double line. Head bifid. Pupation occurs in a cocoon made between two leaves spun together. Host plants include Anacardium, Barringtonia, Memecylon, Eugenia, Syzygium, Nephelium, Chrysophyllum, and recently caterpillars found from Garcinia xanthochymus.

One subspecies recognized.

- Oenospila flavifusata moniliata Warren, 1912
