= Eretmopus =

Scientific classification
- Kingdom: Animalia
- Phylum: Arthropoda
- Class: Insecta
- Order: Lepidoptera
- Family: Geometridae
- Tribe: Hemitheini
- Genus: Eretmopus; Turner, 1910

Genus of moths

Eretmopus is a genus of moths in the family Geometridae erected by Turner in 1910.

== Species ==
- Eretmopus discissa Walker
- Eretmopus marinaria (Guenée, 1857)
