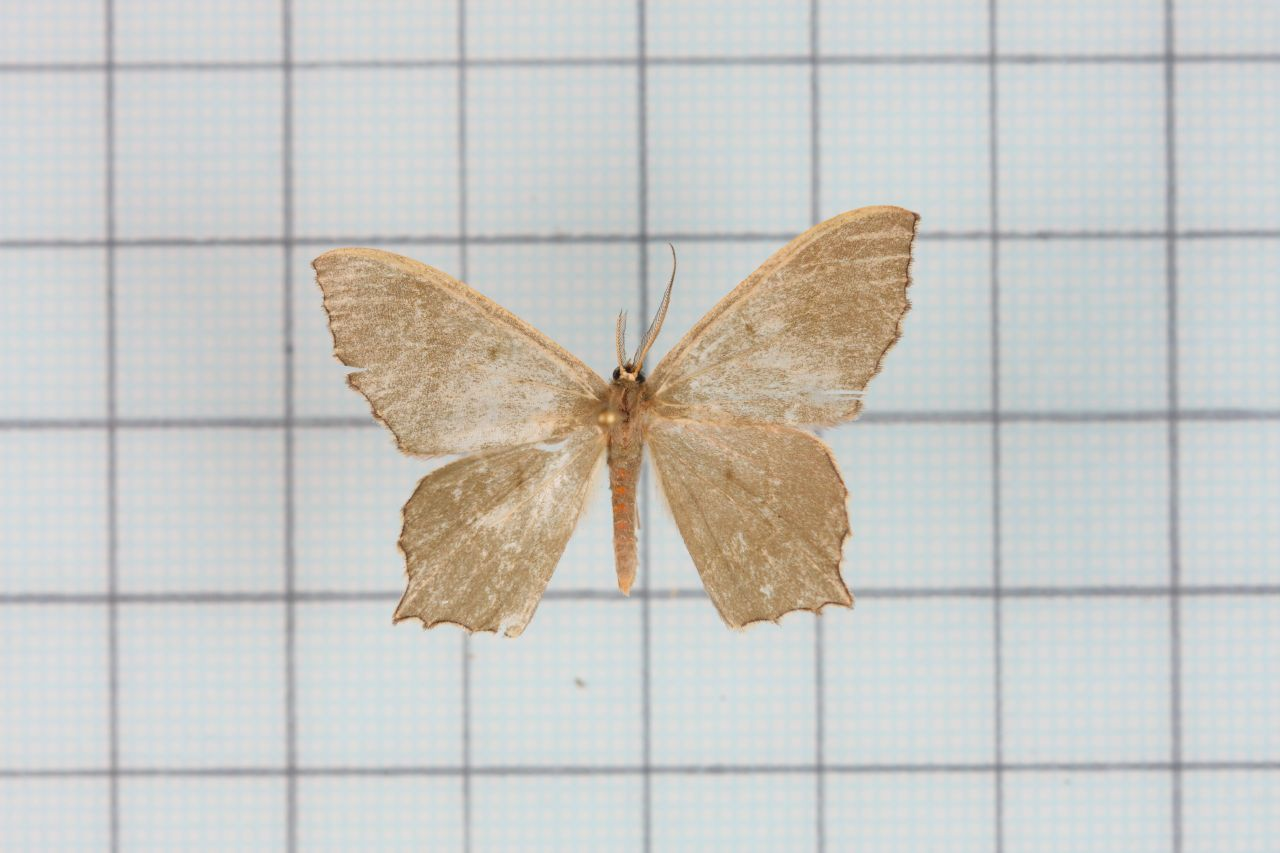

Scientific classification
- Kingdom: Animalia
- Phylum: Arthropoda
- Class: Insecta
- Order: Lepidoptera
- Family: Geometridae
- Genus: Maxates
- Species: M. sinuolata

Binomial name
- Maxates sinuolata (Inoue, 1989)

Synonyms
- Gelasma sinuolata Inoue, 1989

= Maxates sinuolata =

Species of moth

Maxates sinuolata is a moth in the family Geometridae. It was first described by Inoue in 1989. It is found in Taiwan.
