= Maxates dissimulata =

Scientific classification
- Kingdom: Animalia
- Phylum: Arthropoda
- Clade: Pancrustacea
- Class: Insecta
- Order: Lepidoptera
- Family: Geometridae
- Genus: Maxates
- Species: M. dissimulata

Binomial name
- Maxates dissimulata (Walker, 1861)

Synonyms
- Gelasma dissimulata Walker, 1861; Thalssodes dissimulata Walker, 1861; Thalerura marginata Warren, 1894

Species of moth

Maxates dissimulata is a moth of the family Geometridae. It is found in Bhutan.
