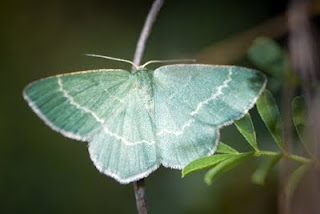
- Chlorissa cloraria

Scientific classification
- Kingdom: Animalia
- Phylum: Arthropoda
- Class: Insecta
- Order: Lepidoptera
- Family: Geometridae
- Tribe: Hemitheini
- Genus: Chlorissa; Stephens, 1831

Synonyms
- Phaiogramma Gumppenberg, 1887; Aoshakuna Matsumura, 1925

= Chlorissa =

Genus of moths

Chlorissa is a genus of moths in the family Geometridae erected by James Francis Stephens in 1831.

== Species ==
- Chlorissa albistrigulata Warren, 1897
- Chlorissa amphitritaria (Oberthür, 1879)
- Chlorissa anadema (Prout, 1930)
- Chlorissa arkitensis Viidalepp, 1988
- Chlorissa asphaleia Wiltshire, 1966
- Chlorissa cloraria (Hübner, [1813])
- Chlorissa discessa Walker, 1861
- Chlorissa etruscaria (Zeller, 1849)
- Chlorissa faustinata (Millière, 1868)
- Chlorissa gelida (Butler, 1889)
- Chlorissa gigantaria (Staudinger, 1892)
- Chlorissa macrotyro Inoue, 1954
- Chlorissa obliterata (Walker, 1863)
- Chlorissa pretiosaria (Staudinger, 1877)
- Chlorissa rubrifrons (Warren, 1894)
- Chlorissa sachalinensis (Matsumura, 1925)
- Chlorissa talvei Viidalepp, 1988
- Chlorissa vermiculata Warren, 1897
- Chlorissa viridata (Linnaeus, 1758) – small grass emerald
