= Oenospila =

Scientific classification
- Kingdom: Animalia
- Phylum: Arthropoda
- Clade: Pancrustacea
- Class: Insecta
- Order: Lepidoptera
- Family: Geometridae
- Tribe: Hemitheini
- Genus: Oenospila; C. Swinhoe, 1892

Genus of moths

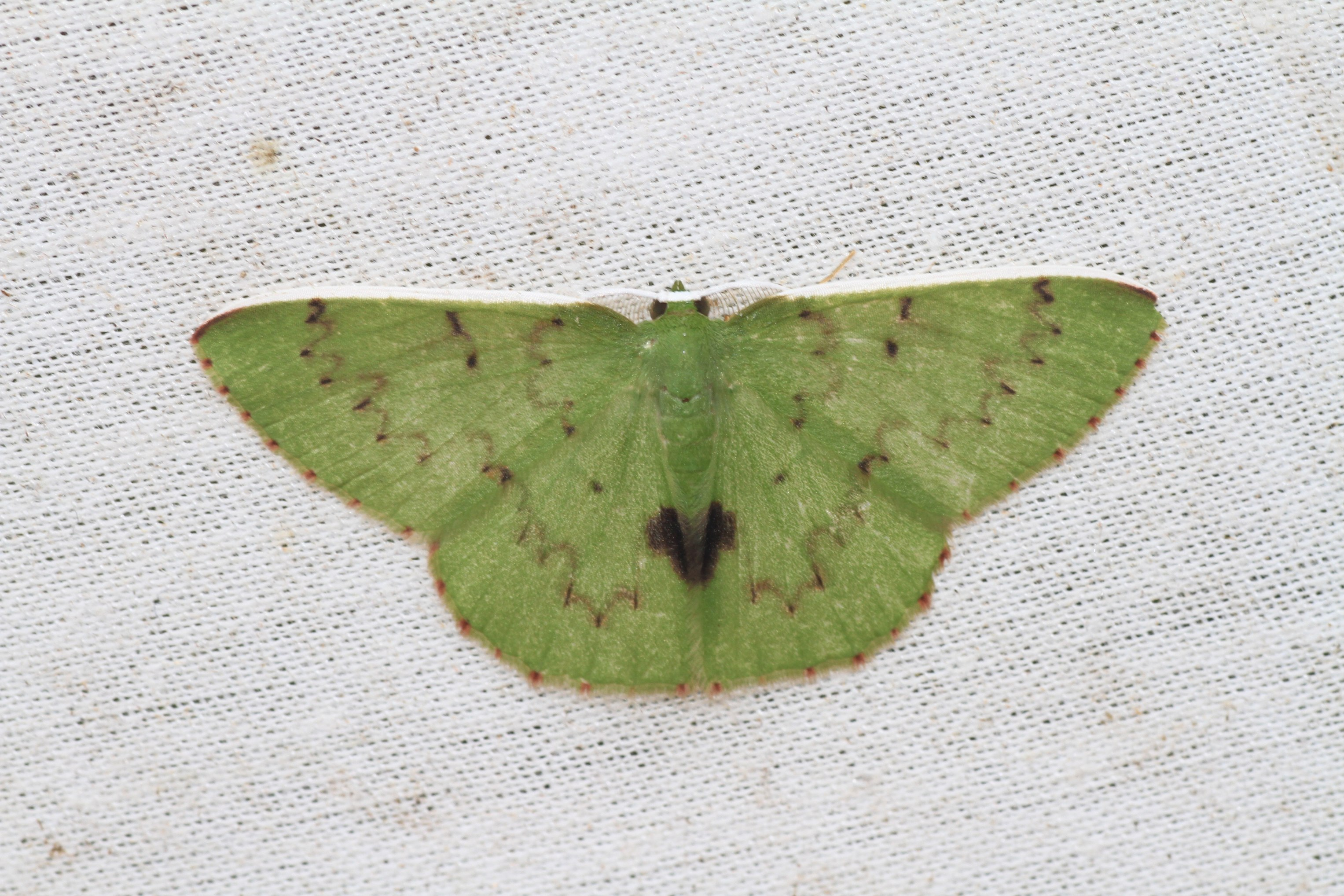
Oenospila altistrix

Oenospila is a genus of moths in the family Geometridae erected by Charles Swinhoe in 1892.

== Species ==
- Oenospila altistrix
- Oenospila flavifusata
- Oenospila flavilinea
- Oenospila gemmans
- Oenospila kopperi
- Oenospila microstrix
- Oenospila moniliata
- Oenospila rufinotata
- Oenospila stellata
