= Maxates acutissima =

Scientific classification
- Kingdom: Animalia
- Phylum: Arthropoda
- Class: Insecta
- Order: Lepidoptera
- Family: Geometridae
- Genus: Maxates
- Species: M. acutissima

Binomial name
- Maxates acutissima (Walker, 1861)

Synonyms
- Gelasma acutissima Walker, 1861; Thalera acutissima Walker, 1861

Species of moth

Maxates acutissima is a moth of the family Geometridae first described by Francis Walker in 1861. It is found in India and Sri Lanka.

Two subspecies are recognized.

- Maxates acutissima goniaria Felder, 1875
- Maxates acutissima perplexata Prout, 1933
