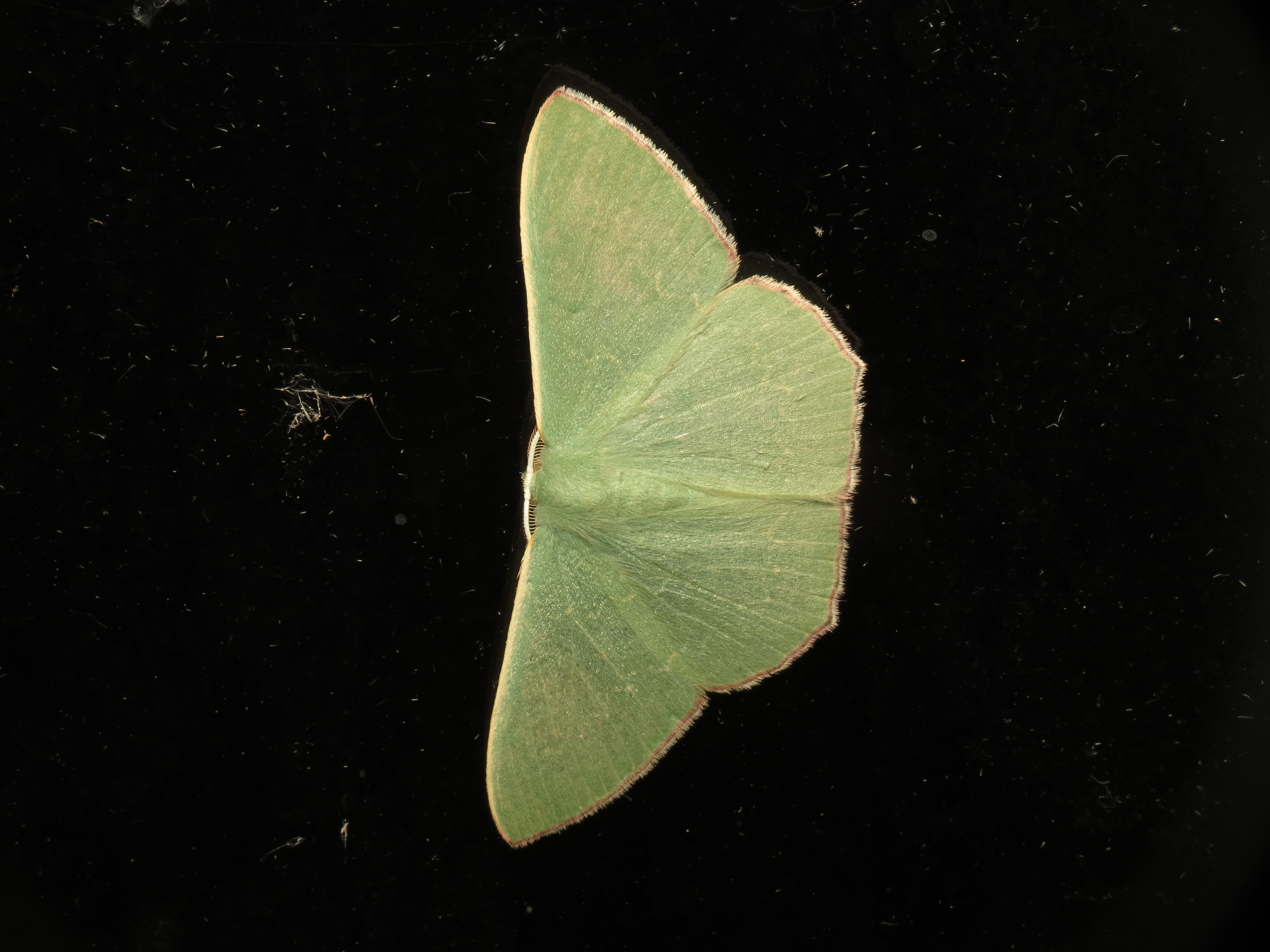

Scientific classification
- Kingdom: Animalia
- Phylum: Arthropoda
- Class: Insecta
- Order: Lepidoptera
- Family: Geometridae
- Genus: Prasinocyma
- Species: P. semicrocea

Binomial name
- Prasinocyma semicrocea (Walker, 1861)

Synonyms
- Geometra semicrocea Walker, 1861; Chlorochroma intermixta Walker, 1861; Chlorochroma decisissima Walker, 1861; Iodis subalpina T.P. Lucas, 1888

= Prasinocyma semicrocea =

Species of moth

Prasinocyma semicrocea, the common gum emerald, is a moth of the family Geometridae. The species was first described by Francis Walker in 1861. It is found in Australia.
