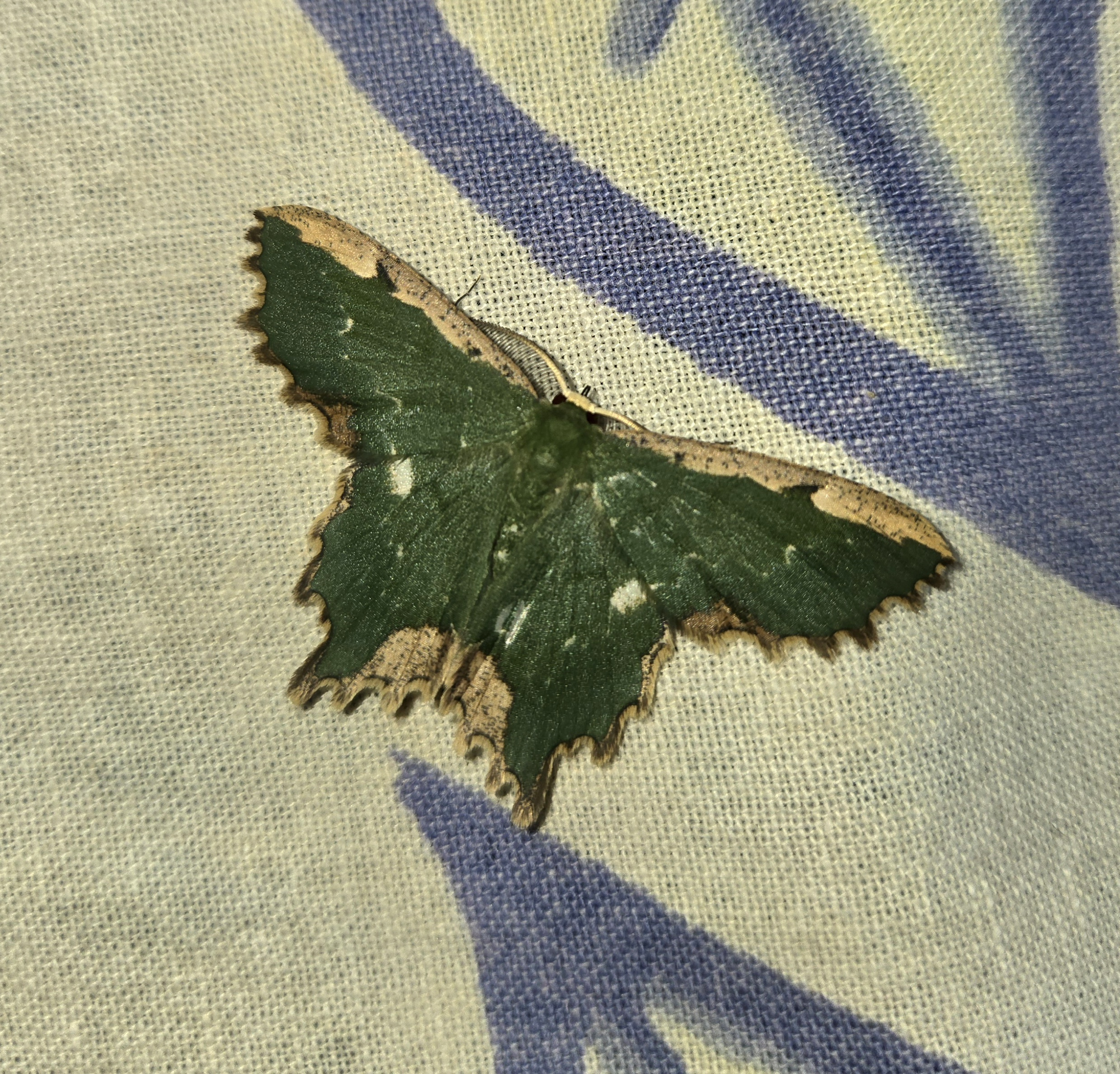
- From Kerala

Scientific classification
- Kingdom: Animalia
- Phylum: Arthropoda
- Clade: Pancrustacea
- Class: Insecta
- Order: Lepidoptera
- Family: Geometridae
- Genus: Maxates
- Species: M. coelataria

Binomial name
- Maxates coelataria Walker, 1861

Synonyms
- Thalassodes coelataria Walker, 1861; Maxates coelataria trychera Prout, 1933

= Maxates coelataria =

Species of moth

Maxates coelataria is a moth of the family Geometridae first described by Francis Walker in 1861. It is found in Sri Lanka and from the Indian subregion to Sundaland.

Sundaland population is classified as a subspecies - Maxates coelataria trychera Prout, 1933.
