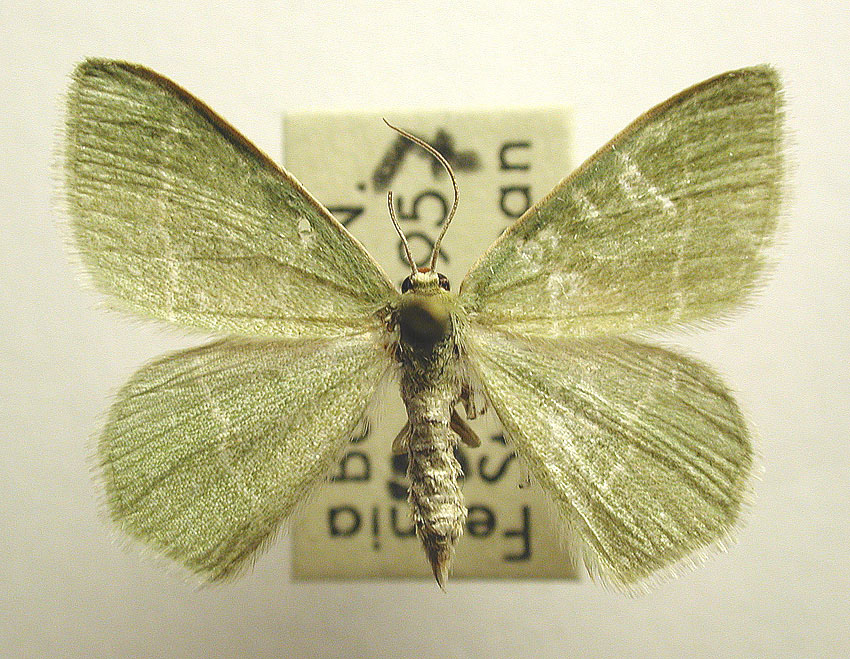

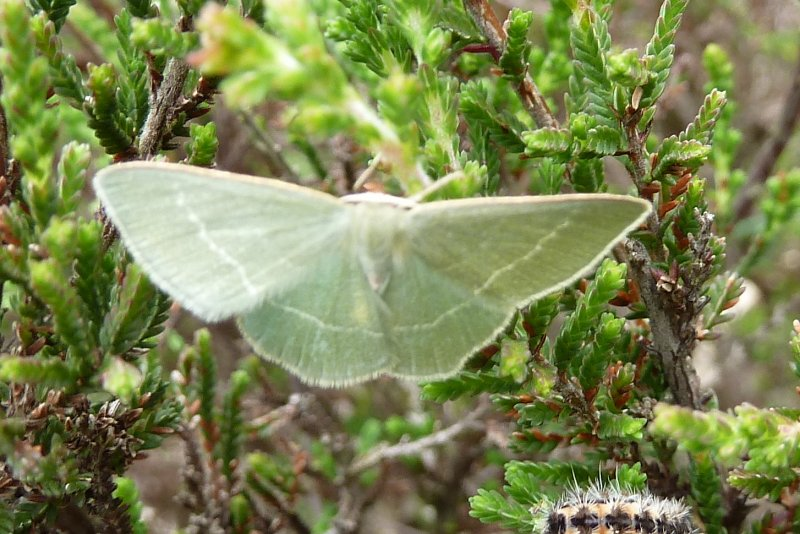

Scientific classification
- Kingdom: Animalia
- Phylum: Arthropoda
- Class: Insecta
- Order: Lepidoptera
- Family: Geometridae
- Genus: Chlorissa
- Species: C. viridata

Binomial name
- Chlorissa viridata (Linnaeus, 1758)

Synonyms
- Phalaena (Geometra) viridata Linnaeus, 1758; Phalaena volutata Fabricius, 1775; Phalaena herbacea Fourcroy, 1785; Geometra prasinata Werneburg, 1864; Geometra viridaria

= Chlorissa viridata =

Small grass emerald

Species of moth

Chlorissa viridata, the small grass emerald, is a moth of the family Geometridae. The species was first described by Carl Linnaeus in his 1758 10th edition of Systema Naturae. It is found from western Europe to the eastern Palearctic.

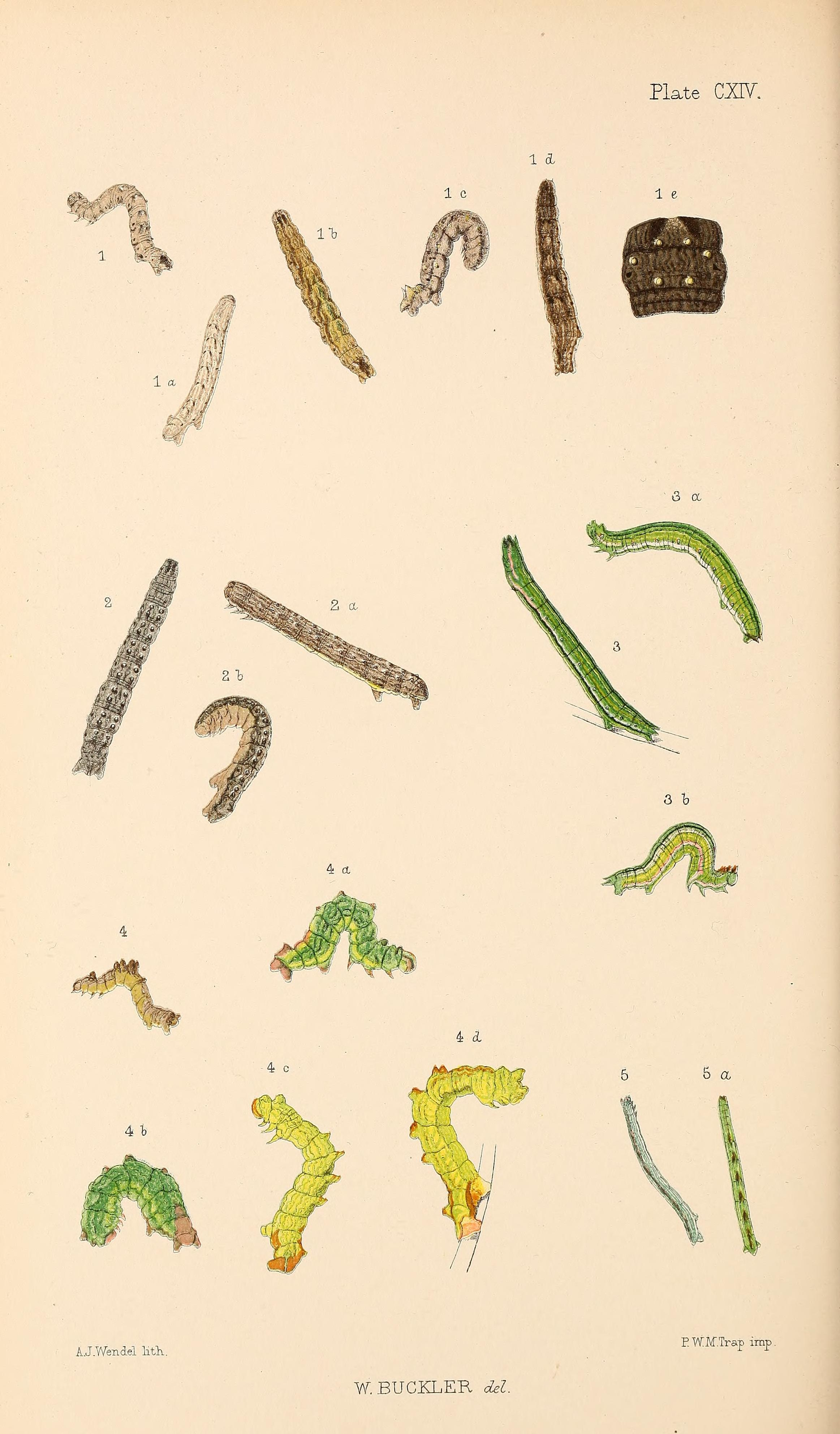
Figs. 5,5a Larva after final moult

== Technical description and variation ==
The base colour of the forewings is green, but soon fades to yellow. Face red-brown, fillet white, crown light green. Antennae in male filiform. Forewings light green; costal edge whitish - ochreous; first line faint, curved; second nearly straight, whitish; cilia white, basal half pale greenish. Hindwings as forewings, but first line absent; termen very obtusely angulated. Larva pale green, with purplish dorsal sometimes connected marks; subdorsal line whitish; lateral ridge pale yellow; head purplish. The wingspan is 24–27 mm.

== Biology ==
The larvae feed on Calluna vulgaris, Betula and Salix species (including Salix repens). Other recorded food plants include Empetrum nigrum, Myrica gale, Vaccinium uliginosum, Quercus, Potentilla, Galium, Hieracium, Artemisia, Ononis, Clematis, Prunus, Crataegus, Corylus, Rubus, Erica, Ulex, Genista, Lotus corniculatus, Crataegus and Ledum palustre. Larvae can be found from July to August. The species overwinters as a pupa.

== Etymology ==
The scientific name viridata refers to the green colour of the wings (viridis means green).

== Subspecies ==
- Chlorissa viridata viridata (central and southern Europe)
- Chlorissa viridata melinaria (Herrich-Schäffer, 1856) (southern Urals)
- Chlorissa viridata insigniata (Staudinger, 1901) (mountains of central Asia)
