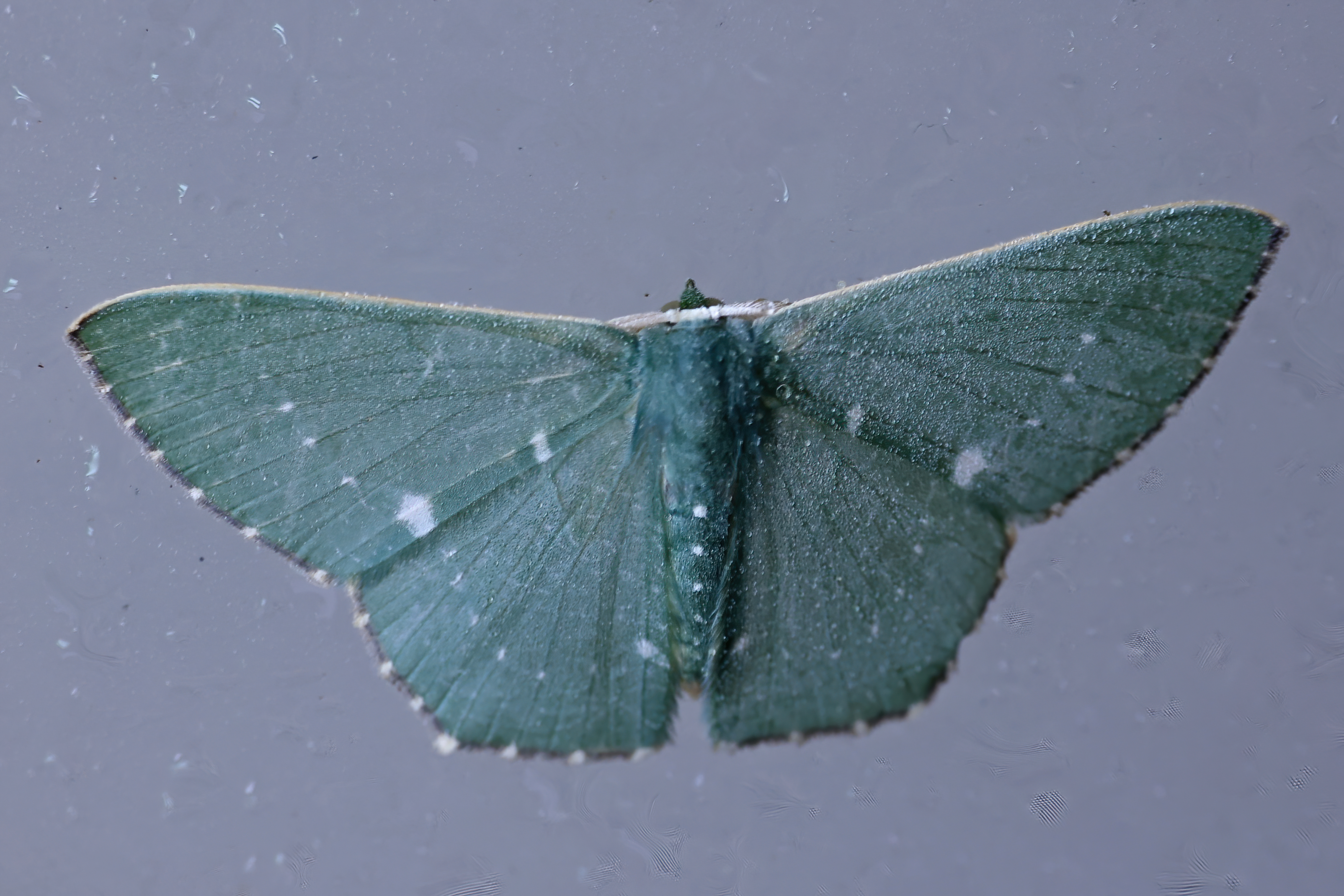
- Orothalassodes hypocrites

Scientific classification
- Kingdom: Animalia
- Phylum: Arthropoda
- Clade: Pancrustacea
- Class: Insecta
- Order: Lepidoptera
- Family: Geometridae
- Subfamily: Geometrinae
- Tribe: Hemitheini
- Genus: Orothalassodes; J.D. Holloway, 1996

= Orothalassodes =

Genus of moths

Orothalassodes is a genus of moths in the family Geometridae. Members of the genus are found primarily in Southeast Asia.

== Species ==
- Orothalassodes absimilis (Warren)
- Orothalassodes aptifimbria (Prout)
- Orothalassodes curiosa (Swinhoe, 1902)
- Orothalassodes falsaria (Prout, 1912)
- Orothalassodes floccosa (Prout, 1917)
- Orothalassodes glabrosa Holloway, 1996
- Orothalassodes hypocrites (Prout, 1912)
- Orothalassodes leucoceraea (Prout, 1925)
- Orothalassodes leucospilota (Moore)
- Orothalassodes luculentus (Inoue, 2006)
- Orothalassodes masuii (Inoue, 2006)
- Orothalassodes mirificus (Inoue, 2006)
- Orothalassodes pantascia (West, 1930)
- Orothalassodes pervulgatus (Inoue, 2005)
- Orothalassodes philippinus (Inoue, 2006)
- Orothalassodes retaka (Holloway, 1996)
- Orothalassodes simplex (Warren)
- Orothalassodes vivida (Prout)
