= Albinospila =

Scientific classification
- Kingdom: Animalia
- Phylum: Arthropoda
- Clade: Pancrustacea
- Class: Insecta
- Order: Lepidoptera
- Family: Geometridae
- Subfamily: Geometrinae
- Tribe: Hemitheini
- Genus: Albinospila; Holloway, 1996

Genus of geometer moths

Albinospila is a genus of moths in the family Geometridae.

== Species ==
- Albinospila floresaria (Walker, 1866)
- Albinospila laticostata Warren
- Albinospila ornatifimbria Warren
- Albinospila oxycentra Meyrick
- Albinospila rhodostigma Warren
- Albinospila syntyche Prout
