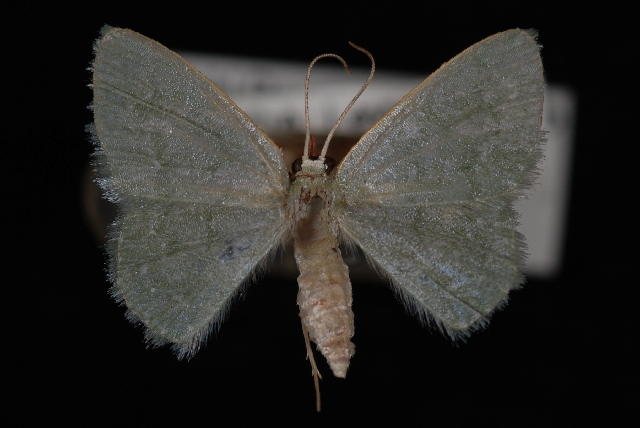
- Chloropteryx paularia

Scientific classification
- Kingdom: Animalia
- Phylum: Arthropoda
- Clade: Pancrustacea
- Class: Insecta
- Order: Lepidoptera
- Family: Geometridae
- Tribe: Hemitheini
- Genus: Chloropteryx; Hulst, 1896

= Chloropteryx =

Genus of moths

Chloropteryx is a genus of moths in the family Geometridae.

== Species ==
- Chloropteryx nordicaria (Schaus, 1901)
- Chloropteryx paularia (Möschler, 1886)
- Chloropteryx tepperaria (Hulst, 1886) - angle-winged emerald moth
