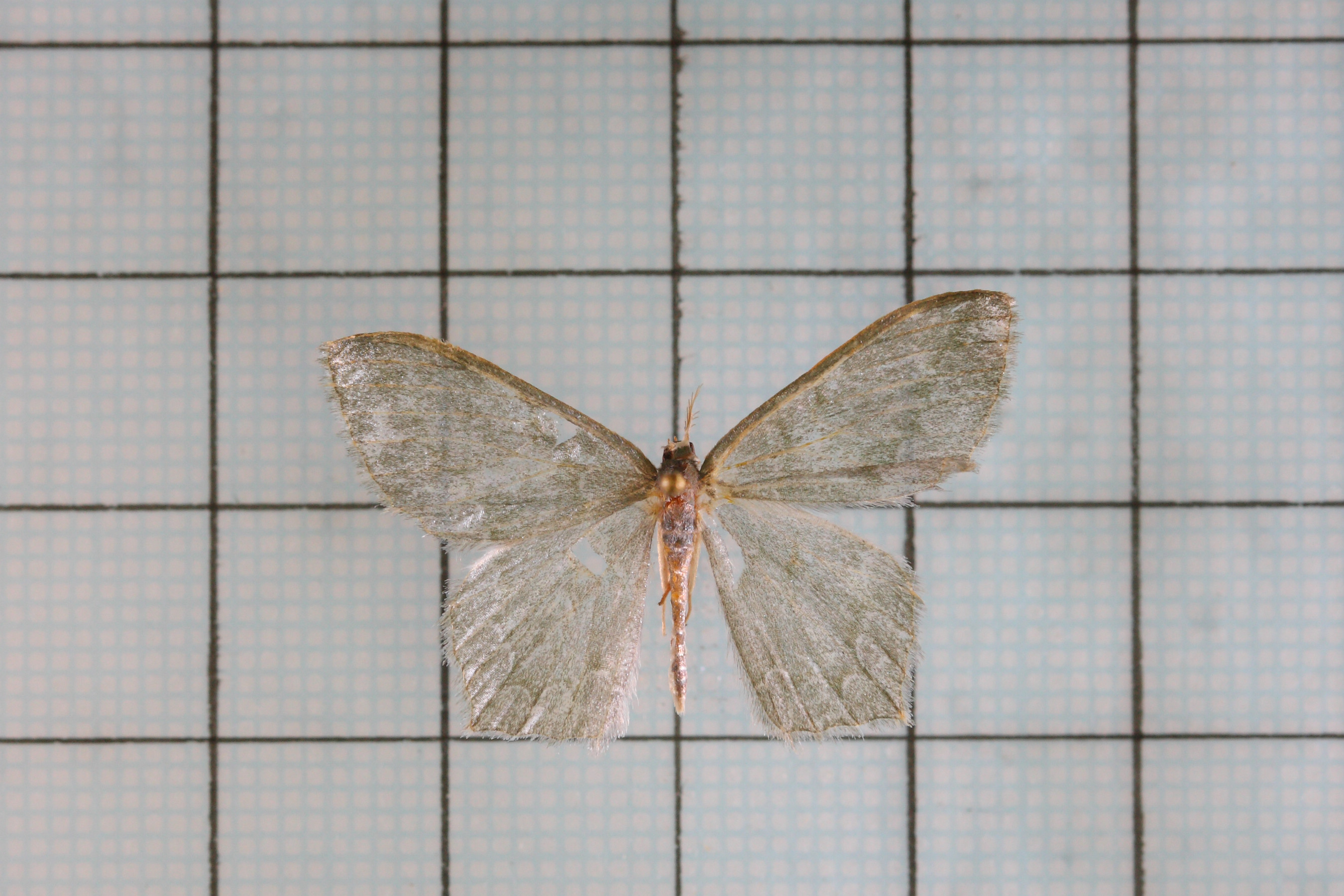

Scientific classification
- Kingdom: Animalia
- Phylum: Arthropoda
- Class: Insecta
- Order: Lepidoptera
- Family: Geometridae
- Genus: Maxates
- Species: M. glaucaria

Binomial name
- Maxates glaucaria (Walker, 1866)

Synonyms
- Thalera glaucaria Walker, 1866

= Maxates glaucaria =

Species of moth

Maxates glaucaria is a moth in the family Geometridae. It is found in Taiwan.
