= Culpinia =

Scientific classification
- Kingdom: Animalia
- Phylum: Arthropoda
- Clade: Pancrustacea
- Class: Insecta
- Order: Lepidoptera
- Family: Geometridae
- Tribe: Hemitheini
- Genus: Culpinia; Prout, 1912

Genus of moths

Culpinia is a genus of moths in the family Geometridae.

== Species ==
- Culpinia diffusa (Walker, 1861)
