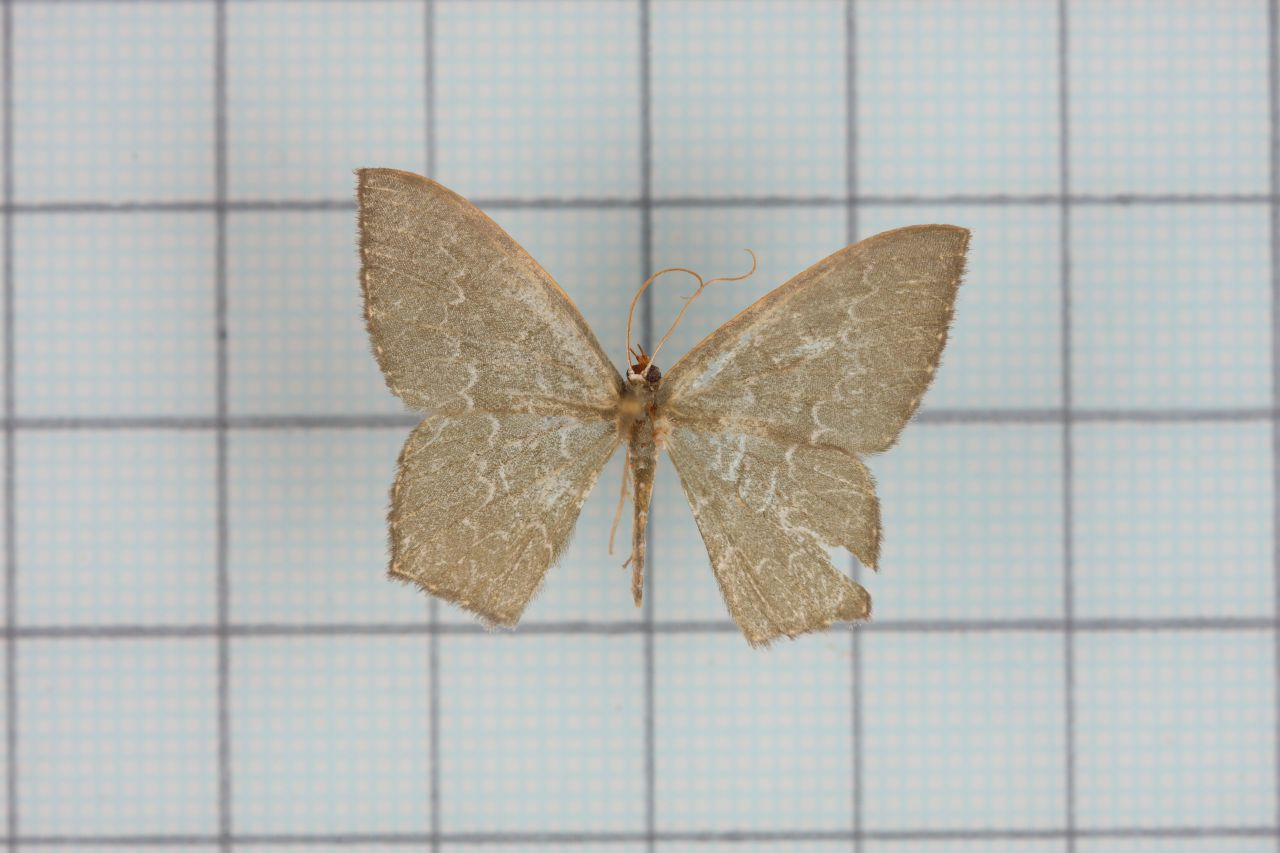

Scientific classification
- Kingdom: Animalia
- Phylum: Arthropoda
- Class: Insecta
- Order: Lepidoptera
- Family: Geometridae
- Genus: Maxates
- Species: M. lactipuncta

Binomial name
- Maxates lactipuncta (Inoue, 1989)

Synonyms
- Gelasma lactipuncta Inoue, 1989; Maxates lactipuncta; Gelasma latipuncta

= Maxates lactipuncta =

Species of moth

Maxates lactipuncta is a moth in the family Geometridae. It is found in Taiwan.
