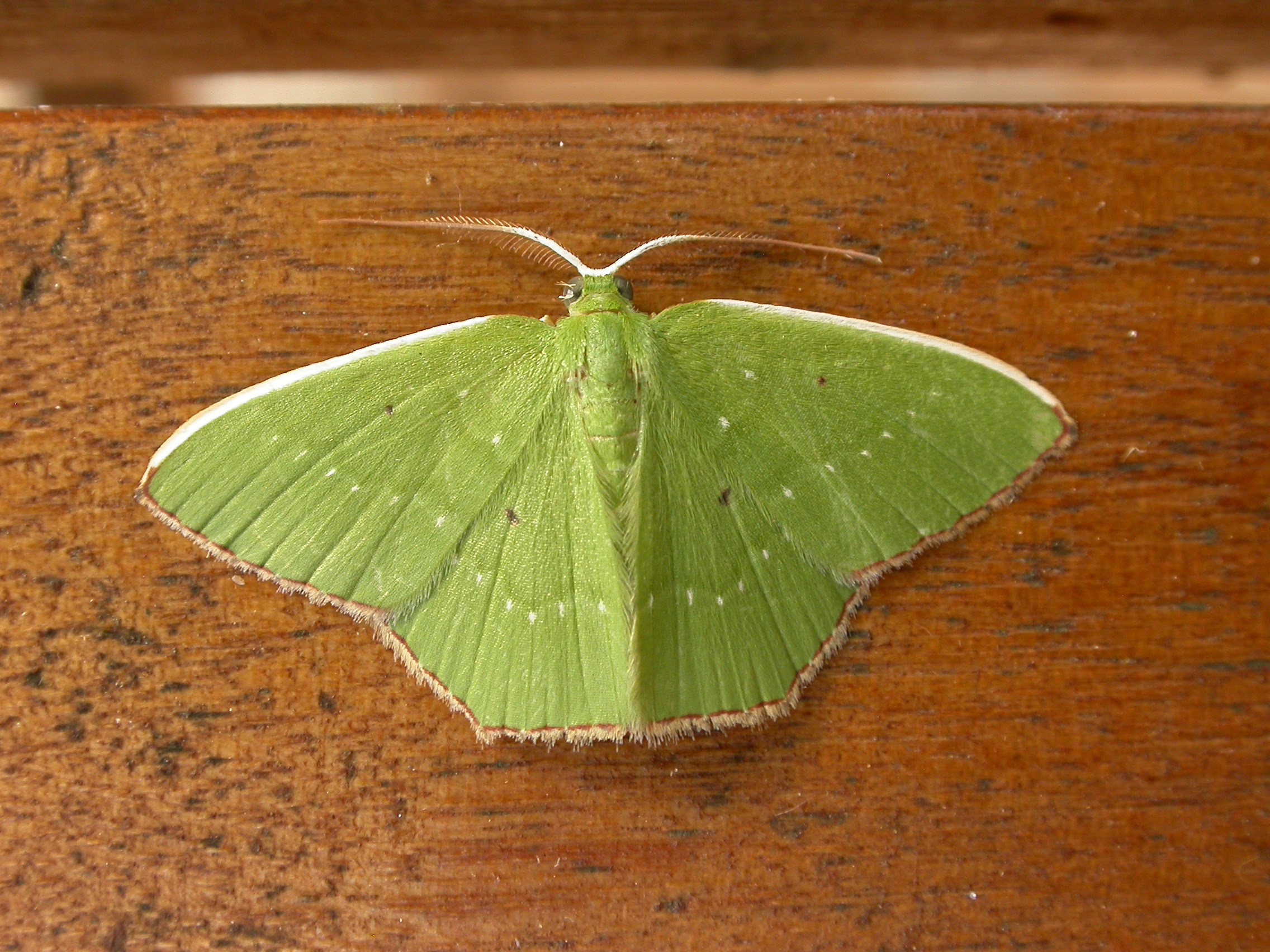

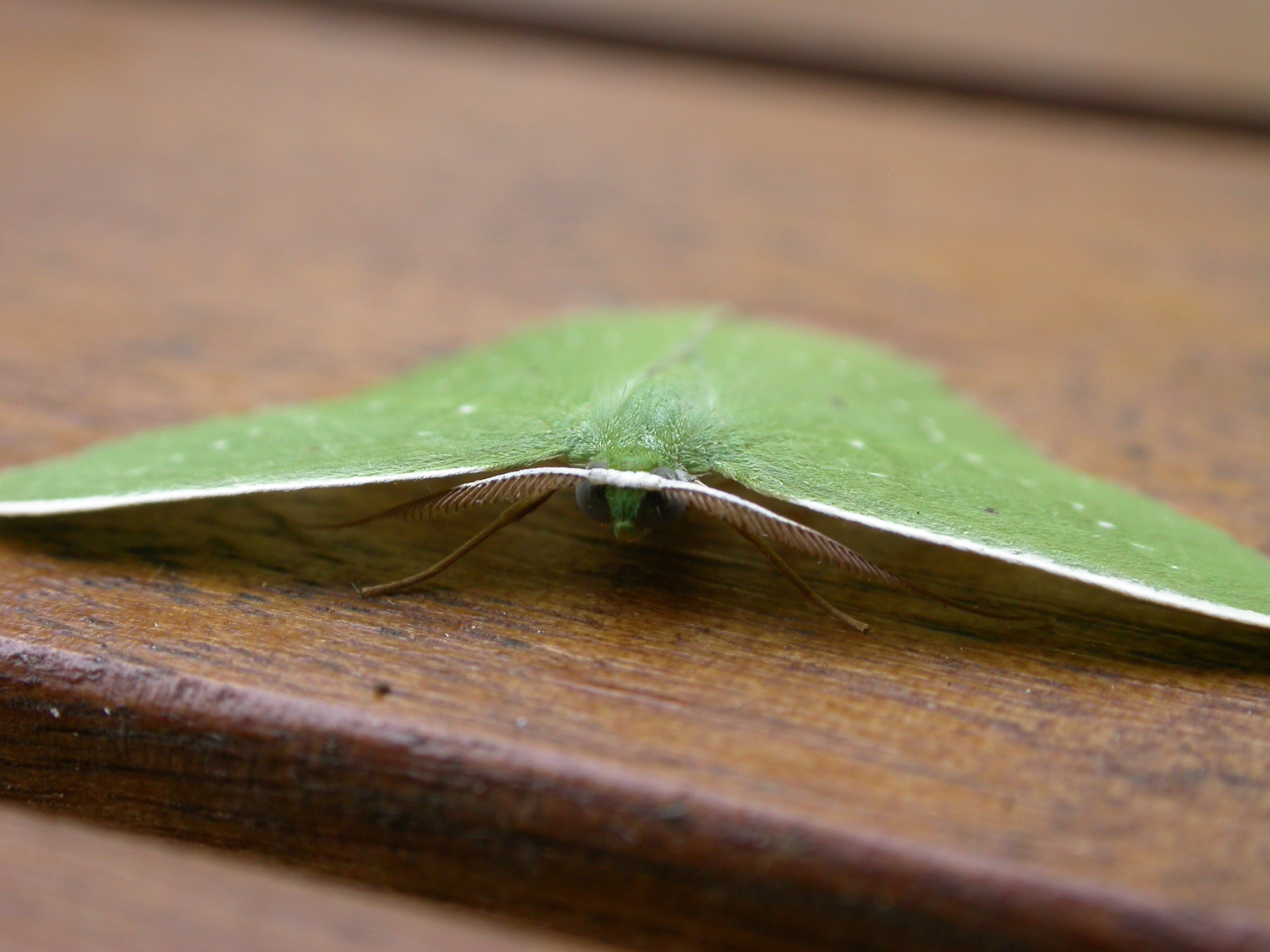

Scientific classification
- Kingdom: Animalia
- Phylum: Arthropoda
- Class: Insecta
- Order: Lepidoptera
- Family: Geometridae
- Genus: Albinospila
- Species: A. floresaria

Binomial name
- Albinospila floresaria (Walker, 1866)

Synonyms
- Geometra floresaria Walker, 1866; Prasinocyma floresaria; Iodis oxycentra Meyrick, 1888

= Albinospila floresaria =

Species of moth

Albinospila floresaria is a species of moth of the family Geometridae first described by Francis Walker in 1866. It is found in the north-eastern Himalayas, as well as on Sumatra, Borneo, Java, Bali, the Philippines, Sulawesi and the Lesser Sundas and in Australia (including Queensland).
