= Orothalassodes leucospilota =

Scientific classification
- Kingdom: Animalia
- Phylum: Arthropoda
- Class: Insecta
- Order: Lepidoptera
- Family: Geometridae
- Genus: Orothalassodes
- Species: O. leucospilota

Binomial name
- Orothalassodes leucospilota (Moore, 1887)

Synonyms
- Thalassodes leucospilota Moore, 1887

Species of moth

Orothalassodes leucospilota is a moth of the family Geometridae first described by Frederic Moore in 1887. It is found in Sri Lanka.
