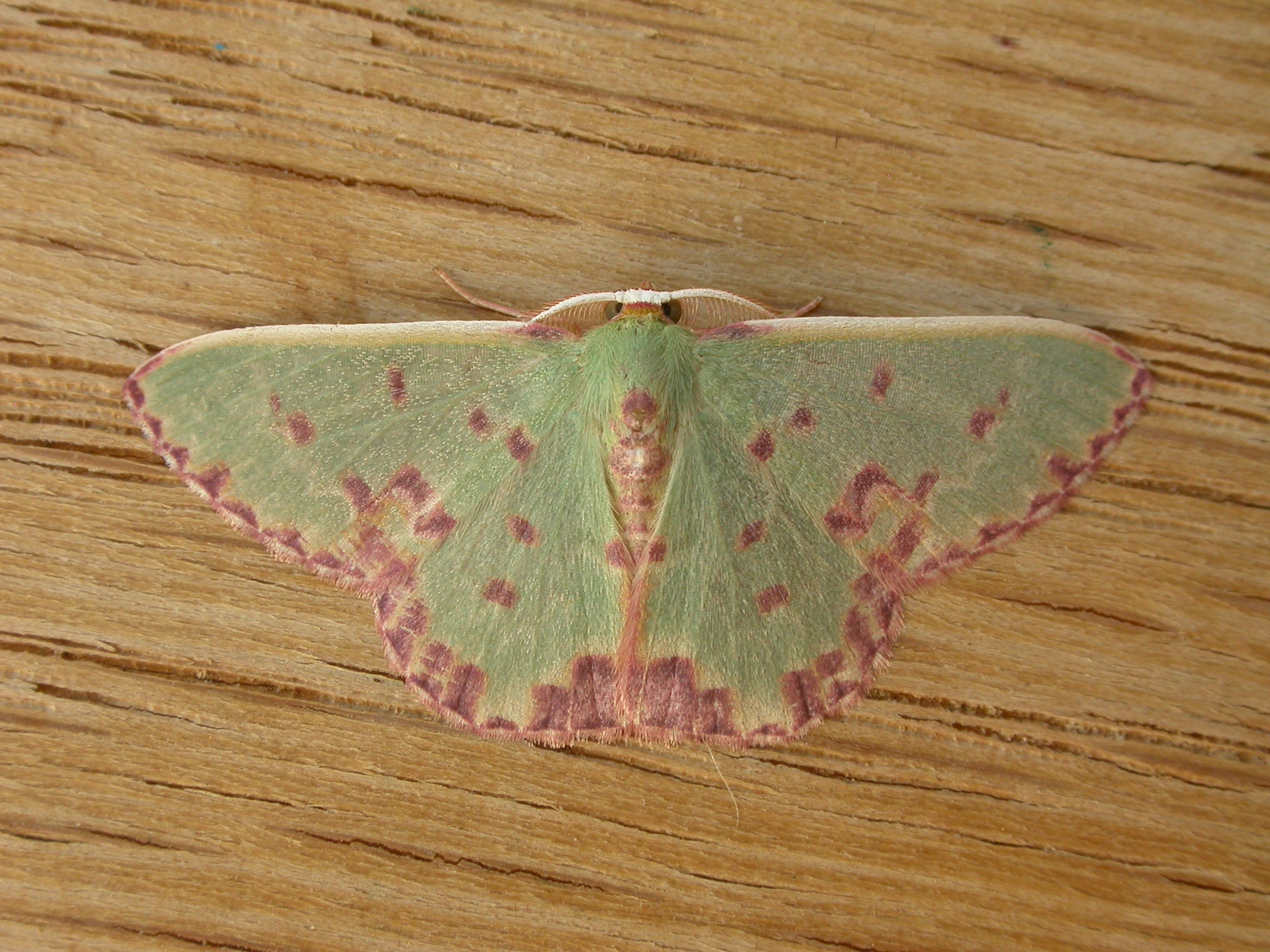

Scientific classification
- Kingdom: Animalia
- Phylum: Arthropoda
- Class: Insecta
- Order: Lepidoptera
- Family: Geometridae
- Tribe: Hemitheini
- Genus: Prasinocyma; Warren, 1897

Type species
- Prasinocyma vermicularia (Guenée, 1857)

Synonyms
- Endemia Warren, 1903; Pauresthes Warren, 1903; Poecilostigma Warren, 1903; Pyrrhaspis Warren, 1903

= Prasinocyma =

Genus of moths

Prasinocyma is a genus of moths in the family Geometridae.

== Selected species ==
- Prasinocyma absimilis Warren, 1901
- Prasinocyma acutipennis Wiltshire, 1994
- Prasinocyma aetheraea Debauche, 1937
- Prasinocyma agglomerata Herbulot, 1996
- Prasinocyma albicosta Walker, 1861
- Prasinocyma albinotata Prout, 1915
- Prasinocyma albiseriata Warren, 1906
- Prasinocyma albisticta Warren, 1901
- Prasinocyma albivenata Herbulot, 1983
- Prasinocyma allocraspeda Prout, 1924
- Prasinocyma amharensis Hausmann, Sciarretta & Parisi, 2016
- Prasinocyma ampla Warren, 1904
- Prasinocyma anadyomene Townsend, 1952
- Prasinocyma angiana Joicey & Talbot, 1917
- Prasinocyma angolica Prout, 1930
- Prasinocyma angulifera Hausmann, Sciarretta & Parisi, 2016
- Prasinocyma angulilinea Warren, 1912
- Prasinocyma annexa Prout, 1924
- Prasinocyma anomoea Turner, 1910
- Prasinocyma aquamarina Hausmann, Sciarretta & Parisi, 2016
- Prasinocyma arabica Wiltshire, 1982
- Prasinocyma bamenda Herbulot, 1982
- Prasinocyma batesi
- Prasinocyma baumgaertneri Hausmann, Sciarretta & Parisi, 2016
- Prasinocyma beryllaria Hausmann, Sciarretta & Parisi, 2016
- Prasinocyma bicolor Warren, 1907
- Prasinocyma bifimbriata Prout, 1912
- Prasinocyma bilobata D. S. Fletcher, 1978
- Prasinocyma bipunctata Prout, 1913
- Prasinocyma bongaensis Hausmann, Sciarretta & Parisi, 2016
- Prasinocyma caecata D. S. Fletcher, 1958
- Prasinocyma caeruleotincta Prout, 1912
- Prasinocyma camerunalta Herbulot, 1986
- Prasinocyma candida Prout, 1923
- Prasinocyma caniola Warren, 1903
- Prasinocyma cellularia (Guenée, 1862)
- Prasinocyma centralis Prout, 1915
- Prasinocyma chloroprosopa Prout, 1913
- Prasinocyma coerulea Warren, 1903
- Prasinocyma congrua Walker, 1869
- Prasinocyma consobrina Warren, 1912
- Prasinocyma convergens Warren, 1907
- Prasinocyma corolla Prout, 1913
- Prasinocyma corrugata D. S. Fletcher, 1958
- Prasinocyma crenulata D. S. Fletcher, 1958
- Prasinocyma croca D. S. Fletcher, 1978
- Prasinocyma crossota Meyrick, 1888
- Prasinocyma debilis Prout, 1913
- Prasinocyma decisissima Walker, 1861
- Prasinocyma delicataria Möschler, 1887
- Prasinocyma dentatilineata Prout, 1913
- Prasinocyma deviata Prout, 1913
- Prasinocyma differens (Warren, 1902)
- Prasinocyma dioscorodes Prout, 1913
- Prasinocyma discata Warren, 1906
- Prasinocyma discipuncta Hausmann, Sciarretta & Parisi, 2016
- Prasinocyma discoprivata Prout, 1913
- Prasinocyma dohertyi Warren, 1903
- Prasinocyma dorsipunctata Warren, 1911
- Prasinocyma edwardsi D. S. Fletcher, 1958
- Prasinocyma eichhhorni Prout, 1926
- Prasinocyma eichhorni Prout, 1920
- Prasinocyma eremica Wiltshire, 1980
- Prasinocyma exililinea Warren, 1906
- Prasinocyma fallax Hausmann, Sciarretta & Parisi, 2016
- Prasinocyma flavilimes Warren, 1906
- Prasinocyma florediscata Warren, 1907
- Prasinocyma fragilis Warren, 1903
- Prasinocyma fraterna Warren, 1907
- Prasinocyma furcata D. S. Fletcher, 1963
- Prasinocyma fusca Hausmann, Sciarretta & Parisi, 2016
- Prasinocyma gajdacsi Prout, 1930
- Prasinocyma geminata Prout, 1913
- Prasinocyma geminipuncta Warren, 1906
- Prasinocyma gemmatimargo Prout, 1915
- Prasinocyma gemmifera Hausmann, Sciarretta & Parisi, 2016
- Prasinocyma geometrica Prout, 1913
- Prasinocyma germinaria (Guenée, 1857)
- Prasinocyma getachewi Hausmann, Sciarretta & Parisi, 2016
- Prasinocyma glauca Warren, 1907
- Prasinocyma hadrata (Felder, 1875)
- Prasinocyma hailei Debauche, 1937
- Prasinocyma hiaraka Viette, 1981
- Prasinocyma ibandana Debauche, 1941
- Prasinocyma idiotica Prout, 1930
- Prasinocyma immaculata (Thunberg, 1784)
- Prasinocyma inconspicuata D. S. Fletcher, 1958
- Prasinocyma indentilinea Warren, 1912
- Prasinocyma indistincta Warren, 1903
- Prasinocyma infirma Prout, 1913
- Prasinocyma inornata D. S. Fletcher, 1958
- Prasinocyma intermedia Warren, 1907
- Prasinocyma inturbida Prout, 1924
- Prasinocyma inversicaulis Prout, 1913
- Prasinocyma iosticta (Meyrick, 1888)
- Prasinocyma iseres Turner, 1922
- Prasinocyma jefferyi Prout, 1930
- Prasinocyma laticostata Warren, 1906
- Prasinocyma latistriga Warren, 1906
- Prasinocyma leucocycla Herbulot, 1982
- Prasinocyma leucophracta Prout, 1932
- Prasinocyma leveneorum Hausmann, Sciarretta & Parisi, 2016
- Prasinocyma limpida Prout, 1922
- Prasinocyma lindemannae D. S. Fletcher, 1958
- Prasinocyma loveridgei Prout, 1926
- Prasinocyma lutulenta Hausmann, Sciarretta & Parisi, 2016
- Prasinocyma magica Hausmann, Sciarretta & Parisi, 2016
- Prasinocyma marginepunctata Warren, 1903
- Prasinocyma marina Warren, 1907
- Prasinocyma megacydes Prout, 1930
- Prasinocyma melanostigma Herbulot, 1996
- Prasinocyma minutapuncta Warren, 1903
- Prasinocyma monikae Hausmann, Sciarretta & Parisi, 2016
- Prasinocyma nandiensis Prout, 1930
- Prasinocyma neavei Prout, 1912
- Prasinocyma neglecta Prout, 1921
- Prasinocyma nereis Townsend, 1952
- Prasinocyma nictata Prout, 1913
- Prasinocyma nigrimacula Prout, 1915
- Prasinocyma nigripunctata (Warren, 1897)
- Prasinocyma niphobola Prout, 1930
- Prasinocyma niphosporas Prout, 1930
- Prasinocyma nivisparsa (Butler, 1882)
- Prasinocyma nonyma Prout, 1926
- Prasinocyma oblita Prout, 1930
- Prasinocyma obsoleta Warren, 1906
- Prasinocyma oculata Prout, 1915
- Prasinocyma ocyptera Meyrick, 1888
- Prasinocyma ornatifimbria Warren, 1903
- Prasinocyma oxybeles Prout, 1913
- Prasinocyma oxycentra (Meyrick, 1888)
- Prasinocyma pallidulata (Mabille 1880)
- Prasinocyma panchlora Prout, 1913
- Prasinocyma pavlitzkiae D. S. Fletcher, 1958
- Prasinocyma pedicata D. S. Fletcher, 1956
- Prasinocyma periculosa Warren, 1903
- Prasinocyma perineti Viette, 1981
- Prasinocyma peristicta West, 1930
- Prasinocyma permagna Herbulot, 1982
- Prasinocyma permitis Prout, 1932
- Prasinocyma perpolluta Prout, 1913
- Prasinocyma perpulverata Prout, 1916
- Prasinocyma philocala Prout, 1924
- Prasinocyma phoenicogramma Prout, 1913
- Prasinocyma phyllosa (Pagenstecher, 1886)
- Prasinocyma pictifimbria Warren, 1904
- Prasinocyma polluta Warren, 1903
- Prasinocyma pomonae Warren, 1912
- Prasinocyma pratti Prout, 1924
- Prasinocyma pulchraria Swinhoe, 1904
- Prasinocyma pumilata D. S. Fletcher, 1956
- Prasinocyma punctifimbria Warren, 1904
- Prasinocyma punctilligera Warren, 1906
- Prasinocyma punctulata Warren, 1903
- Prasinocyma pupillata (Warren, 1902)
- Prasinocyma rhodocosma (Meyrick, 1888)
- Prasinocyma rhodocycla Prout, 1917
- Prasinocyma rhodostigma Prout, 1916
- Prasinocyma robusta Hausmann, Sciarretta & Parisi, 2016
- Prasinocyma rubrimacula (Warren, 1899)
- Prasinocyma rudipunctata Prout, 1924
- Prasinocyma ruficollis Prout, 1913
- Prasinocyma ruficosta Warren, 1906
- Prasinocyma ruficulmen Prout, 1913
- Prasinocyma rufimargo Warren, 1912
- Prasinocyma rufistriga Warren, 1906
- Prasinocyma rugistrigula Prout, 1912
- Prasinocyma salutaria (Swinhoe, 1904)
- Prasinocyma sanguinicosta Prout, 1912
- Prasinocyma scintillans Warren, 1906
- Prasinocyma semicincta Herbulot, 1982
- Prasinocyma semicrocea Walker, 1861
- Prasinocyma seminivea Warren, 1906
- Prasinocyma septentrionalis Hausmann, Sciarretta & Parisi, 2016
- Prasinocyma serratilinea Warren, 1912
- Prasinocyma shoa
- Prasinocyma signifera Warren, 1903
- Prasinocyma simiaria (Guenée, 1857)
- Prasinocyma simplex Warren, 1912
- Prasinocyma simpliciata D. S. Fletcher, 1958
- Prasinocyma sororcula Warren, 1907
- Prasinocyma stefani Hausmann, Sciarretta & Parisi, 2016
- Prasinocyma stictimargo (Warren, 1902)
- Prasinocyma stictoloma Prout, 1928
- Prasinocyma syntyche Prout, 1913
- Prasinocyma tandi Bethune-Baker, 1913
- Prasinocyma tenera Warren, 1903
- Prasinocyma tetracosmia Prout, 1930
- Prasinocyma tranquilla Prout, 1917
- Prasinocyma transita Prout, 1930
- Prasinocyma trematerrai Hausmann, Sciarretta & Parisi, 2016
- Prasinocyma triangulata D. S. Fletcher, 1958
- Prasinocyma tricolorifrons (Prout, 1913)
- Prasinocyma trifilifimbria Prout, 1915
- Prasinocyma triglena Prout, 1930
- Prasinocyma tripuncta Prout, 1913
- Prasinocyma tryphera Prout, 1924
- Prasinocyma turlini Herbulot, 1982
- Prasinocyma vagabunda Warren, 1903
- Prasinocyma vagilinea Prout, 1911
- Prasinocyma vagrans Prout, 1913
- Prasinocyma venata Prout, 1913
- Prasinocyma vermicularia (Guenée, 1857)
- Prasinocyma vestigiata Warren, 1906
- Prasinocyma votiva Prout, 1913
