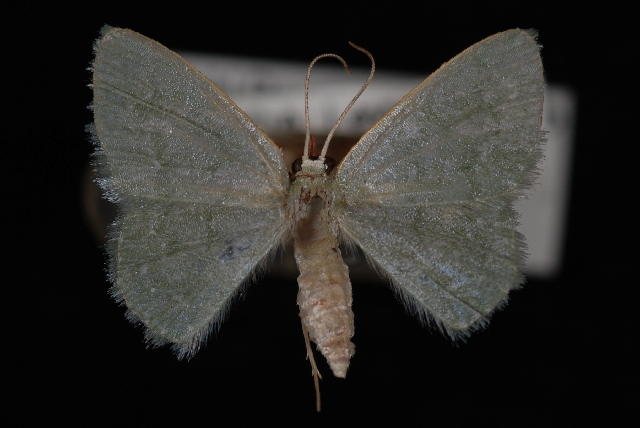

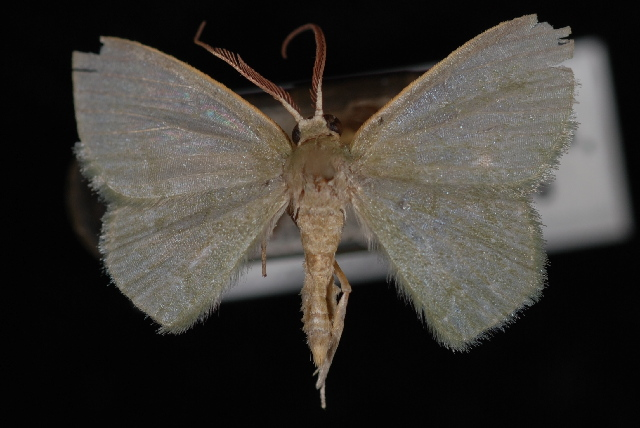

Scientific classification
- Kingdom: Animalia
- Phylum: Arthropoda
- Class: Insecta
- Order: Lepidoptera
- Family: Geometridae
- Genus: Chloropteryx
- Species: C. paularia

Binomial name
- Chloropteryx paularia (Möschler, 1886)

Synonyms
- Nemoria paularia Möschler, 1886; Aplodes punctata Warren, 1904

= Chloropteryx paularia =

Species of moth

Chloropteryx paularia is a moth of the family Geometridae first described by Heinrich Benno Möschler in 1886. The wingspan is about 16 mm.

It is found in the U.S. state of Florida, as well as in the Greater Antilles.

The larvae feed on Myrica cerifera.
