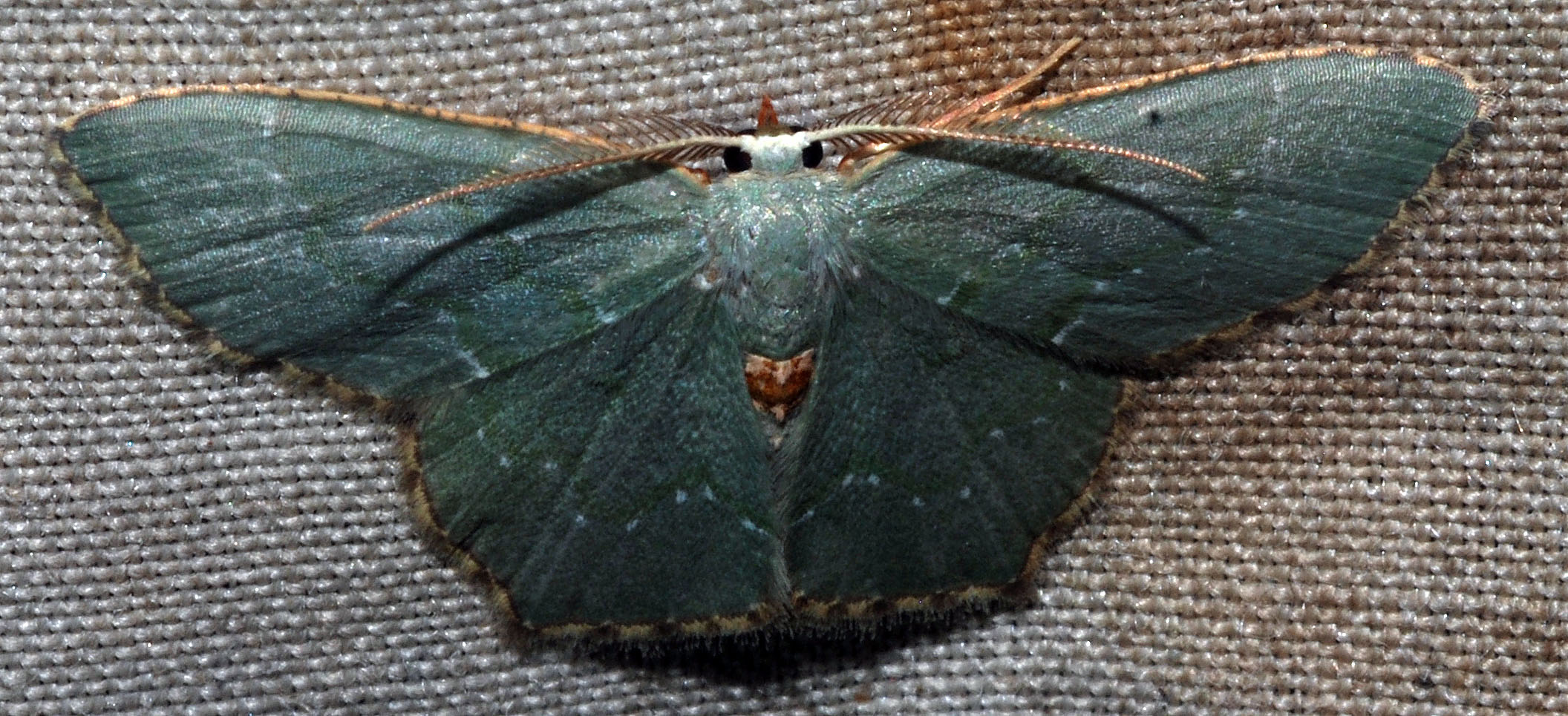

Scientific classification
- Domain: Eukaryota
- Kingdom: Animalia
- Phylum: Arthropoda
- Class: Insecta
- Order: Lepidoptera
- Family: Geometridae
- Genus: Chloropteryx
- Species: C. tepperaria

Binomial name
- Chloropteryx tepperaria (Hulst, 1886)

Synonyms
- Nemoria tepperaria Hulst, 1886

= Chloropteryx tepperaria =

Species of moth

Chloropteryx tepperaria, the angle-winged emerald moth, is a moth of the family Geometridae. The species was first described by George Duryea Hulst in 1886 and it is found in the southeastern United States.

== Description ==
=== Adults ===
Like many emerald moths, adults have green wings and a green body with a white area between the eyes. The hindwings have a pointed outer margin, motivating the descriptive English name "angle-winged emerald". Forewings and hindwings each have antemedial and postmedial lines of disconnected, white spots and tan and brown, checkered terminal and costal lines.

== Range ==
The species' range extends from Texas and Oklahoma in the west to Florida and Pennsylvania in the east.

== Life cycle ==
=== Adults ===
Adults have been reported from March to October north of Florida and year-round in Florida.
