= Episothalma =

Scientific classification
- Kingdom: Animalia
- Phylum: Arthropoda
- Class: Insecta
- Order: Lepidoptera
- Family: Geometridae
- Tribe: Hemitheini
- Genus: Episothalma; Swinhoe, 1893

Genus of moths

Episothalma is a genus of moths in the family Geometridae erected by Swinhoe in 1893.

== Species ==
- Episothalma robustraria (Guenée, 1857)
- Episothalma cognataria Swinhoe, 1903
