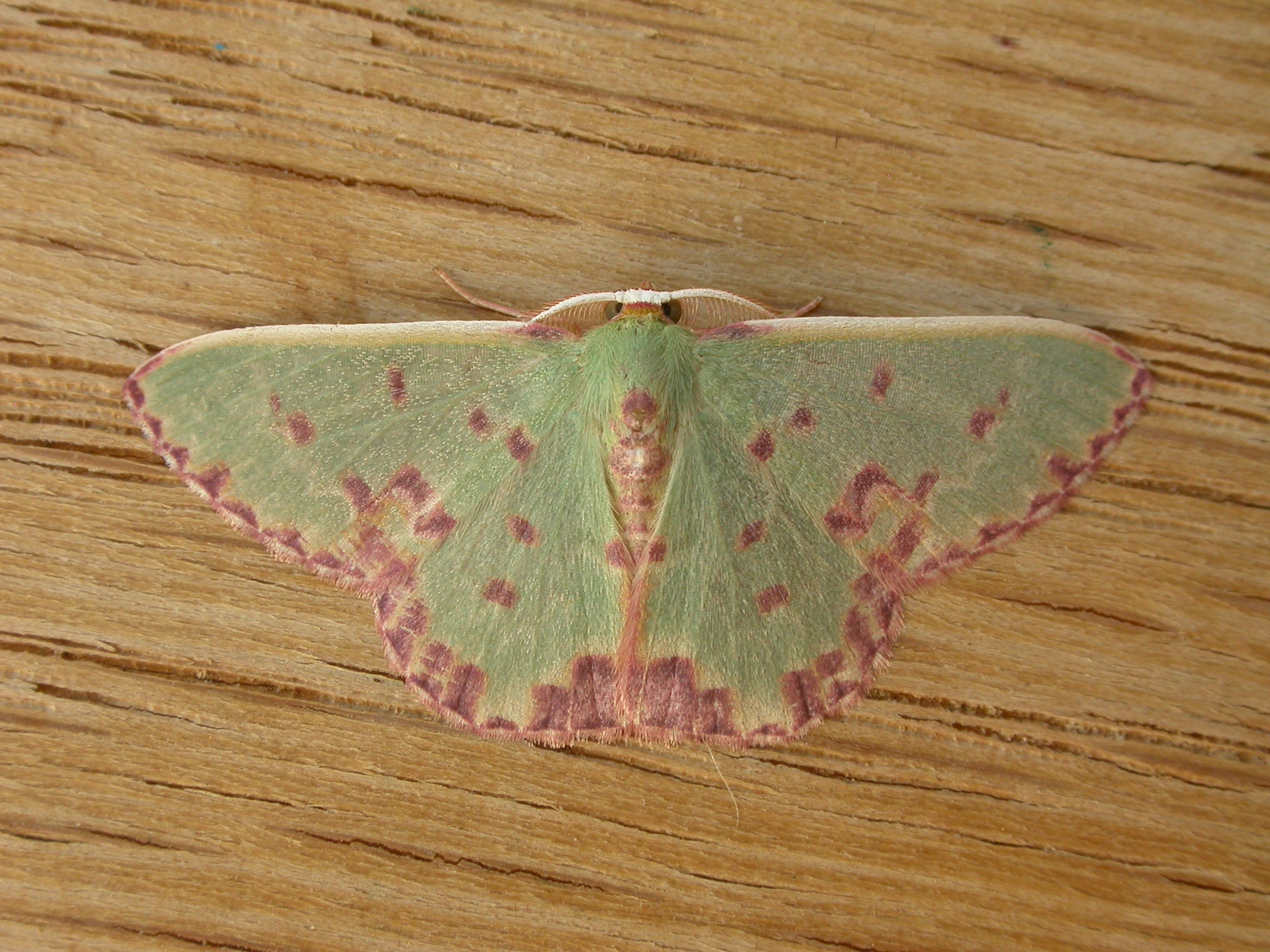

Scientific classification
- Kingdom: Animalia
- Phylum: Arthropoda
- Class: Insecta
- Order: Lepidoptera
- Family: Geometridae
- Genus: Prasinocyma
- Species: P. rhodocosma

Binomial name
- Prasinocyma rhodocosma (Meyrick, 1888)

Synonyms
- Iodis rhodocosma Meyrick, 1888

= Prasinocyma rhodocosma =

Species of moth

Prasinocyma rhodocosma, the northern emerald, is a species of moth of the family Geometridae first described by Edward Meyrick in 1888. It is found in Australia in northern Western Australia, the Northern Territory, Queensland and New South Wales.

The wingspan is about 30 mm.

The larvae feed on young shoots and leaves of Eucalyptus species
