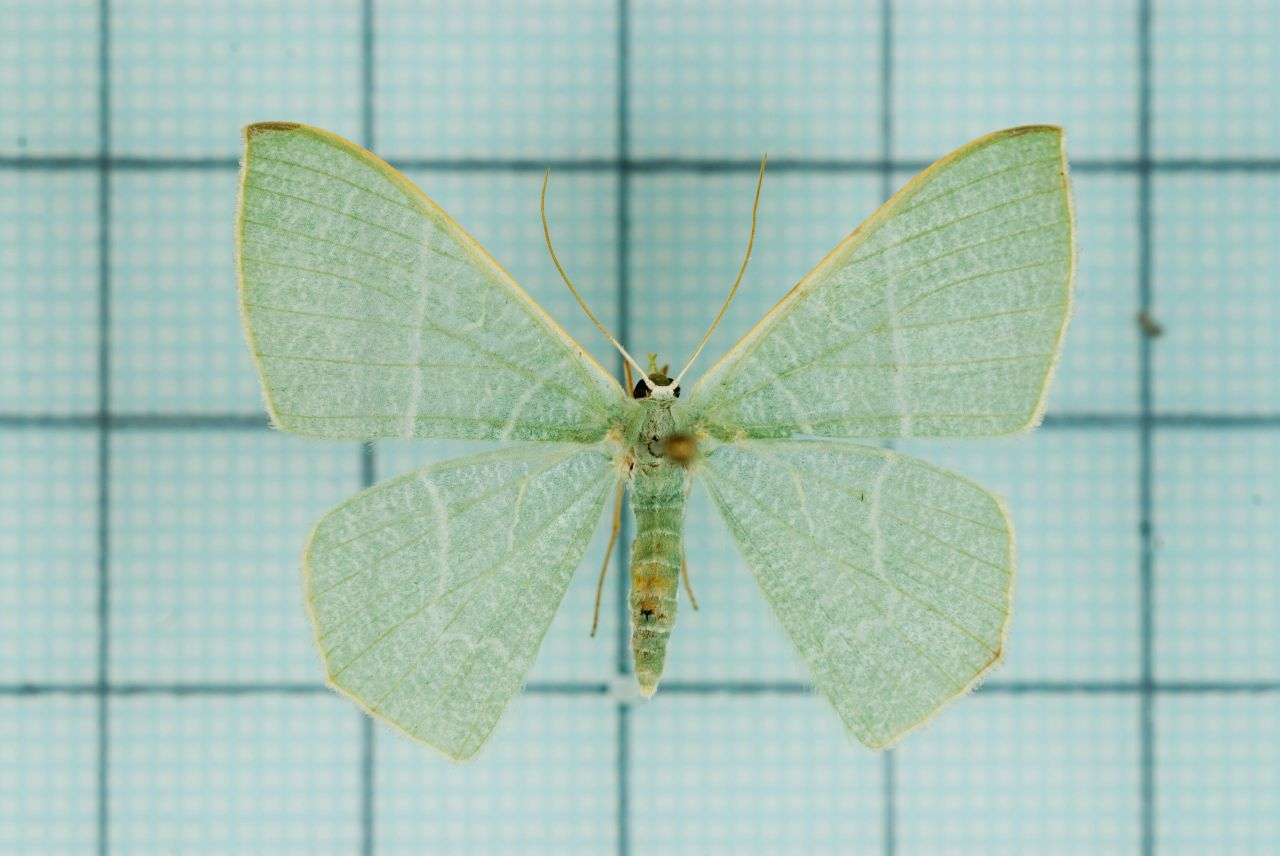

Scientific classification
- Kingdom: Animalia
- Phylum: Arthropoda
- Class: Insecta
- Order: Lepidoptera
- Family: Geometridae
- Genus: Orothalassodes
- Species: O. pervulgatus

Binomial name
- Orothalassodes pervulgatus Inoue, 2005

= Orothalassodes pervulgatus =

Species of moth

Orothalassodes pervulgatus is a species of moth of the family Geometridae. It is found in Pakistan, north-eastern India, Nepal, Thailand, Vietnam, Taiwan and the Philippines (Luzon).
