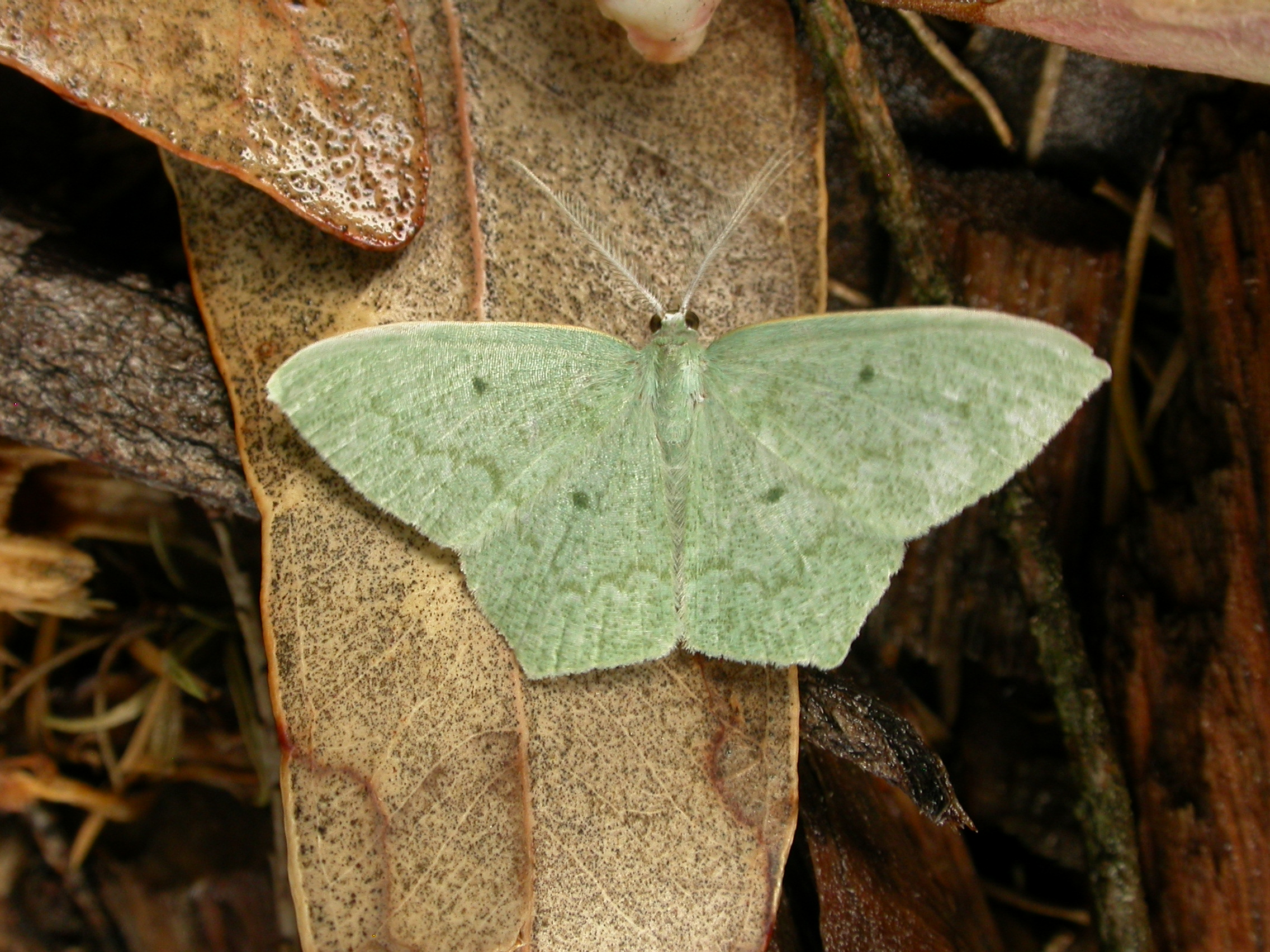
- Maxates centrophylla

Scientific classification
- Kingdom: Animalia
- Phylum: Arthropoda
- Class: Insecta
- Order: Lepidoptera
- Family: Geometridae
- Tribe: Joditi
- Genus: Maxates; Moore, 1887

Type species
- Thalassodes coelataria Walker, 1861

Species
- Gelasma Warren, 1893; Thalerura C. Swinhoe, 1894; Thalerura Warren, 1894

= Maxates =

Genus of moths

Maxates is a genus of moths in the family Geometridae first described by Frederic Moore in 1887.

== Description ==
Palpi porrect (extending forward), where the second joint thickly scaled and reaching beyond the frons. Third joint naked. Forewings with highly arched costa towards apex. The outer margin usually highly crenulate and excised between veins 4 and 6. Veins 3, 4 and 7 to 10 stalked. Vein 11 anastomosing (fusing) with vein 12. Hindwings quadrate, with margin highly crenulate (scalloped) and produced to a point at vein 6, and tail at vein 4. Veins 3, 4 and 6, 7 stalked.

== Species ==
- Maxates acutissima Walker
- Maxates albistrigata (Warren, 1895)
- Maxates angulata (Lucas, 1888)
- Maxates calaina (Turner, 1910)
- Maxates centrophylla (Meyrick, 1888)
- Maxates coelataria (Walker, 1861)
- Maxates cowani (Butler, 1880)
- Maxates dissimulata (Walker, 1861)
- Maxates dysides Prout, 1922
- Maxates eumixis (Prout 1911)
- Maxates fuscifimbria (Prout)
- Maxates fuscipuncta (Warren, 1898)
- Maxates glaucaria (Walker, 1866)
- Maxates goniaria (Felder & Rogenhofer, 1875)
- Maxates grandificaria Graeser, 1890
- Maxates inaptaria (Walker)
- Maxates iridescoides Holloway, 1996
- Maxates iridescens (Warren)
- Maxates korintjiensis (Prout, 1933)
- Maxates lactipuncta (Inoue, 1989)
- Maxates lugubriosa Holloway, 1996
- Maxates marculenta (Prout, 1933)
- Maxates magnipuncta (Prout, 1916)
- Maxates melancholica (Prout, 1912)
- Maxates melinau Holloway, 1996
- Maxates multitincta (Lucas, 1891)
- Maxates muluensis Holloway, 1996
- Maxates obliterata Holloway, 1996
- Maxates orthodesma (Lower, 1894)
- Maxates prasina (Warren, 1894)
- Maxates protrusa (Butler, 1878)
- Maxates selenosema (Turner, 1941)
- Maxates seria Holloway, 1996
- Maxates sinuolata (Inoue, 1989)
- Maxates subannulata (Prout)
- Maxates submontana Holloway, 1996
- Maxates tanygona (Turner, 1904)
- Maxates thetydaria (Guenée, 1857)
- Maxates tristis Holloway, 1996
- Maxates variegata Holloway, 1996
- Maxates veninotata (Warren, 1894)
- Maxates waterstradti (Prout, 1933)
