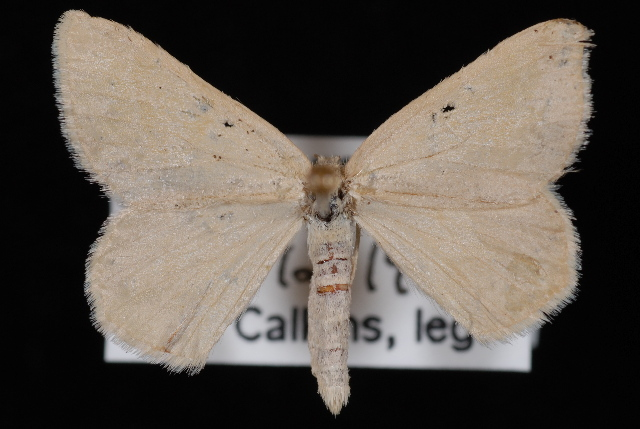
- Mesothea incertata

Scientific classification
- Kingdom: Animalia
- Phylum: Arthropoda
- Class: Insecta
- Order: Lepidoptera
- Family: Geometridae
- Genus: Mesothea; Warren, 1901
- Species: M. incertata

Binomial name
- Mesothea incertata (Walker, 1863)

= Mesothea =

Genus of moths

Mesothea is a monotypic moth genus in the family Geometridae described by Warren in 1901. Its only species, Mesothea incertata, the day emerald or plain emerald, was first described by Walker in 1863. It is found in North America.

The MONA or Hodges number for Mesothea incertata is 7085.

== Subspecies ==
It has two subspecies:

- Mesothea incertata incertata (Walker, 1863)^{i g}
- Mesothea incertata viridipennata (Hulst, 1896)^{i c g}

Data sources: i = ITIS, c = Catalogue of Life, g = GBIF, b = Bugguide.net
