= Chloristola =

Scientific classification
- Kingdom: Animalia
- Phylum: Arthropoda
- Clade: Pancrustacea
- Class: Insecta
- Order: Lepidoptera
- Family: Geometridae
- Genus: Chloristola; Holloway, 1996
- Species: C. setosa

Binomial name
- Chloristola setosa Holloway, 1996

Genus of moths

Chloristola is a monotypic moth genus in the family Geometridae. Its only species, Chloristola setosa, is known from Borneo and Malaysia. The type locality is Gunung Mulu National Park. Both the genus and species were first described by Jeremy Daniel Holloway in 1996.
