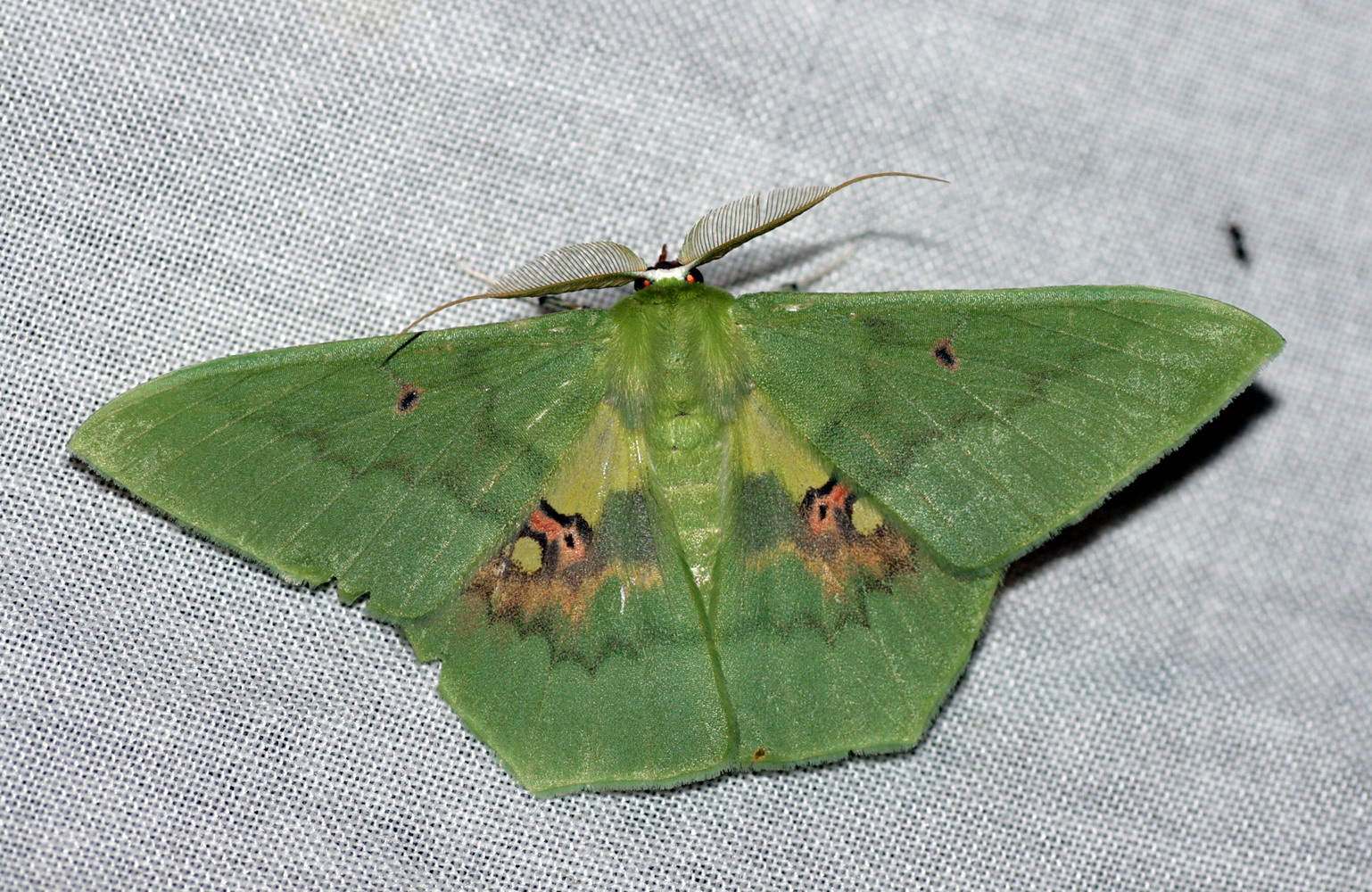

Scientific classification
- Kingdom: Animalia
- Phylum: Arthropoda
- Clade: Pancrustacea
- Class: Insecta
- Order: Lepidoptera
- Family: Geometridae
- Genus: Aporandria; Warren, 1894
- Species: A. specularia

Binomial name
- Aporandria specularia (Guenée, 1857)

Synonyms
- Geometra specularia Guenée, 1857; Aporandria specularia haplograpta Prout, 1922

= Aporandria =

Monotypic genus of geometer moths

Aporandria is a monotypic genus of moths in the family Geometridae described by Warren in 1894. Its single species, Aporandria specularia, was first described by Achille Guenée in 1857. It is found in Sri Lanka, India, Vietnam, Thailand, the Andamans, Peninsular Malaysia, Sumatra, Borneo, the Philippines and Sulawesi.

== Description ==
The genus was described as having the palpi obliquely porrect (extending forward), thickly scaled, and reaching beyond the sharp frontal tuft. Antennae bipectinated (comb like on both sides), with long branches to two-thirds length in both sexes. Hind tibia not dilated. Forewings with produced and acute apex. The outer margin oblique. Veins 3 and 4 from angle of cell or shortly stalked. Veins 6, 7, 8, 9 and 10 stalked and vein 11 free. Hindwings with angled outer margin at vein 4 and veins 3, 4 and 6, 7 stalked.

In the description of the species, it said that the wingspan of the male is about 54 mm and the female 60 mm. It is pea green. Palpi and frons chocolate coloured. Vertex of the head white. Forewings with a dark speck at end of cell. Hindwings with a yellow-green base. A large lunulate pinkish mark with brown edges and a black speck on it at end of cell, extending towards costa and inner margin as an indistinct band. Both wings with traces of waved postmedial line. Ventral side of palpi, thorax and base of wings silvery white.

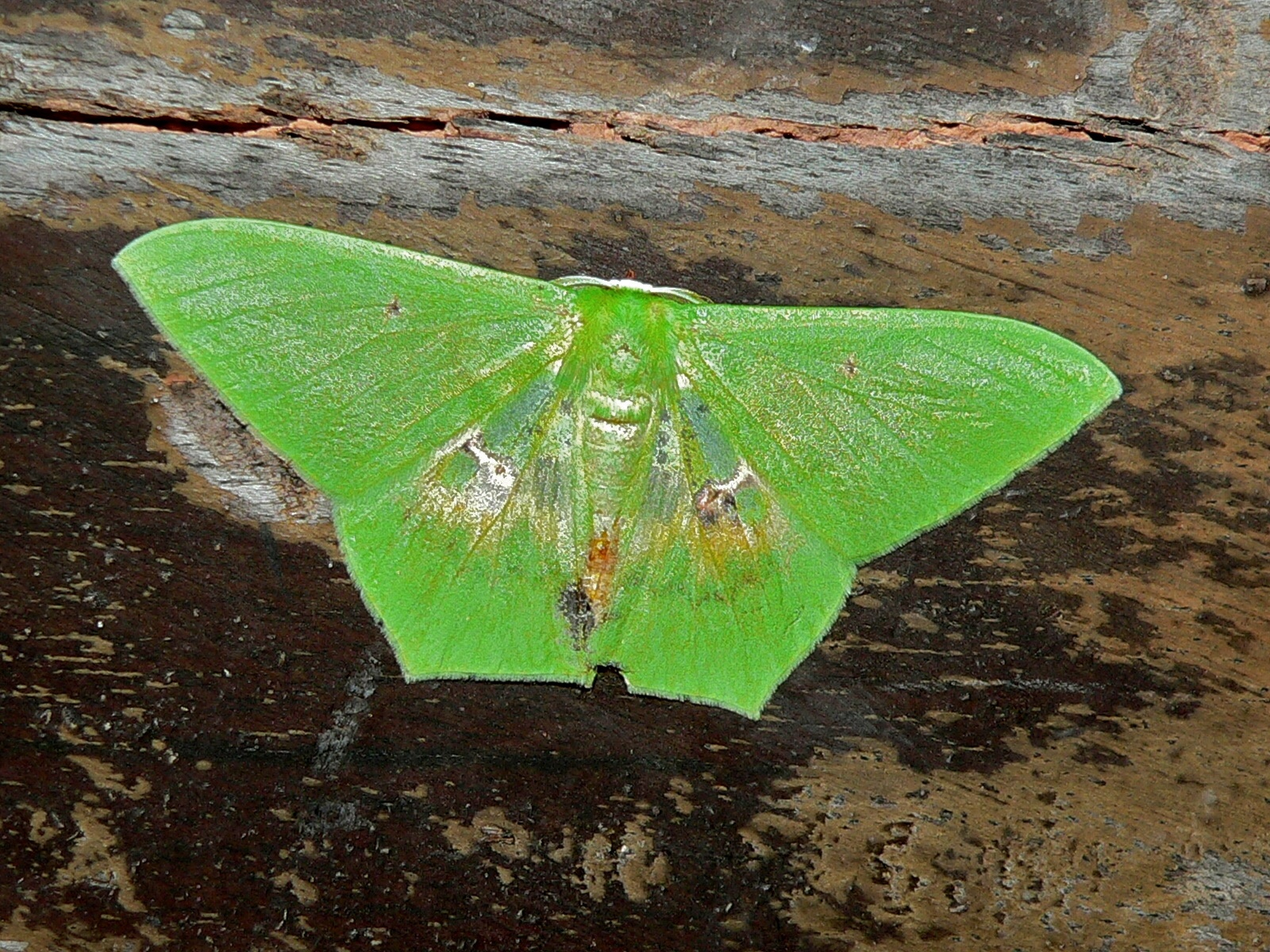

The larvae are slender, with a green body. Head strongly bifid (cleft). True legs are pale purplish red with darker spots. Early instars are dark yellow. It shows a twig-like posture when at rest. Eggs are thick, elongate-oval disc-shaped. Larvae have been recorded on Mangifera, Terminalia, Eugenia, Areca, Rhizophora and Nephelium species.

It is a lowland species inhabited in both forested and disturbed or cultivated areas.
