= List of geometrid genera: D =

The very large moth family Geometridae contains genera beginning with A, B, C, D, E, F, G, H, I, J, K, L, M, N, O, P, Q, R, S, T, U, V, W, X, Y and Z.

Those beginning with D include:

- Dagostinia
- Dalima
- Danala
- Daniela
- Dargeia
- Darisa
- Darisodes
- Dasciopteryx
- Dasimatia
- Dasybela
- Dasyboarmia
- Dasycorsa
- Dasycosymbia
- Dasyfidonia
- Dasymacaria
- Dasypteroma
- Dasysternica
- Dasystole
- Dasyuris
- Debos
- Declana
- Dectochilus
- Defoa
- Deileptena
- Deileptenia
- Deinoptila
- Deinopygia
- Deinotrichia
- Delaeveria
- Delocharis
- Dentinalia
- Deptalia
- Derambila
- Derrioides
- Derxena
- Descoreba
- Desertobia
- Desmobathra
- Desmoclystia
- Desmonaxa
- Destutia
- Detunda
- Deuteronomos
- Deuterostegane
- Devara
- Devarodes
- Devenilia
- Dextridens
- Diactinia
- Diaprepesilla
- Diathera
- Diceratodesia
- Dichorda
- Dichordophora
- Dichostrepsia
- Dichroma
- Dichromatopodia
- Dichromodes
- Dicrognophos
- Dictyodea
- Dicyclodes
- Didymoctenia
- Dietzea
- Digonis
- Digonodes
- Digrammia
- Dilophodes
- Dindica
- Dindicodes
- Dineurodes
- Dinophalus
- Dioptrochasma
- Dioscore
- Diplochroa
- Diploctena
- Diplodesma
- Diplublephara
- Diplurodes
- Diptychia
- Diptychis
- Dirce
- Discalma
- Dischidesia
- Disclisioprocta
- Discoglypha
- Discoloxia
- Discomiosis
- Dissolophodes
- Dissomorphia
- Dissophthalmus
- Dissoplaga
- Distagma
- Distoneura
- Dithalama
- Dithecodes
- Dizuga
- Dochephora
- Docirava
- Dolabrossa
- Dolerophyle
- Dolerosceles
- Dolichoneura
- Dolichopyge
- Doloma
- Dolosis
- Dooabia
- Doratoptera
- Dorsifulcrum
- Drepanodes
- Drepanogynis
- Drepanopsis
- Drepanopterula
- Drepanulatrix
- Drucia
- Dryadopsis
- Drymoea
- Drymoptila
- Dryochlora
- Dualana
- Duga
- Duliophyle
- Duraglia
- Durbana
- Dysbatus
- Dyscheilia
- Dyscheralcis
- Dyschlorodes
- Dyschloropsis
- Dyschoroneura
- Dyscia
- Dyscymatoge
- Dysdamartia
- Dysephyra
- Dysethia
- Dysethiodes
- Dysgnophos
- Dysmigia
- Dysnymphus
- Dysphania
- Dyspteris
- Dysrhoe
- Dysstroma
- Dystypoptila
