= Dasycephala =

Dasycephala may refer to:

- Dasycephala, a taxonomic synonym for Attila, a genus of tropical birds
- Dasycephala, a taxonomic synonym for Dasycorsa, a genus of moths
- Dasycephala, a taxonomic synonym for Spermacoce, a genus of flowering plants
