= Rarithea =

Scientific classification
- Kingdom: Animalia
- Phylum: Arthropoda
- Clade: Pancrustacea
- Class: Insecta
- Order: Lepidoptera
- Family: Limacodidae
- Genus: Rarithea; Solovyev, 2010
- Species: R. phocea

Binomial name
- Rarithea phocea (Hampson, 1910)

Synonyms
- Miresa phocea Hampson, 1910

Genus of moths

Rarithea phocea is a moth of the family Limacodidae first described by George Hampson in 1910. It is the only species in the genus Rarithea. It is found in Sri Lanka.

The adult moth including the forewing length, is about 12 mm long. The antennae are short and bipectinate. The forewings are brown and elongated with an acute apex and slightly concave costa. The forewings contain a dark basal wing part, a dark brown discal streak, an ochreous medial fascia and dark brown external fascia. The hindwings are brownish and without patterns.
