= Idiochlora caudularia =

Scientific classification
- Kingdom: Animalia
- Phylum: Arthropoda
- Class: Insecta
- Order: Lepidoptera
- Family: Geometridae
- Genus: Idiochlora
- Species: I. caudularia

Binomial name
- Idiochlora caudularia Guenée, 1857

Species of moth

Idiochlora caudularia is a moth of the family Geometridae first described by Achille Guenée in 1857. It is found in Sri Lanka and South India.
