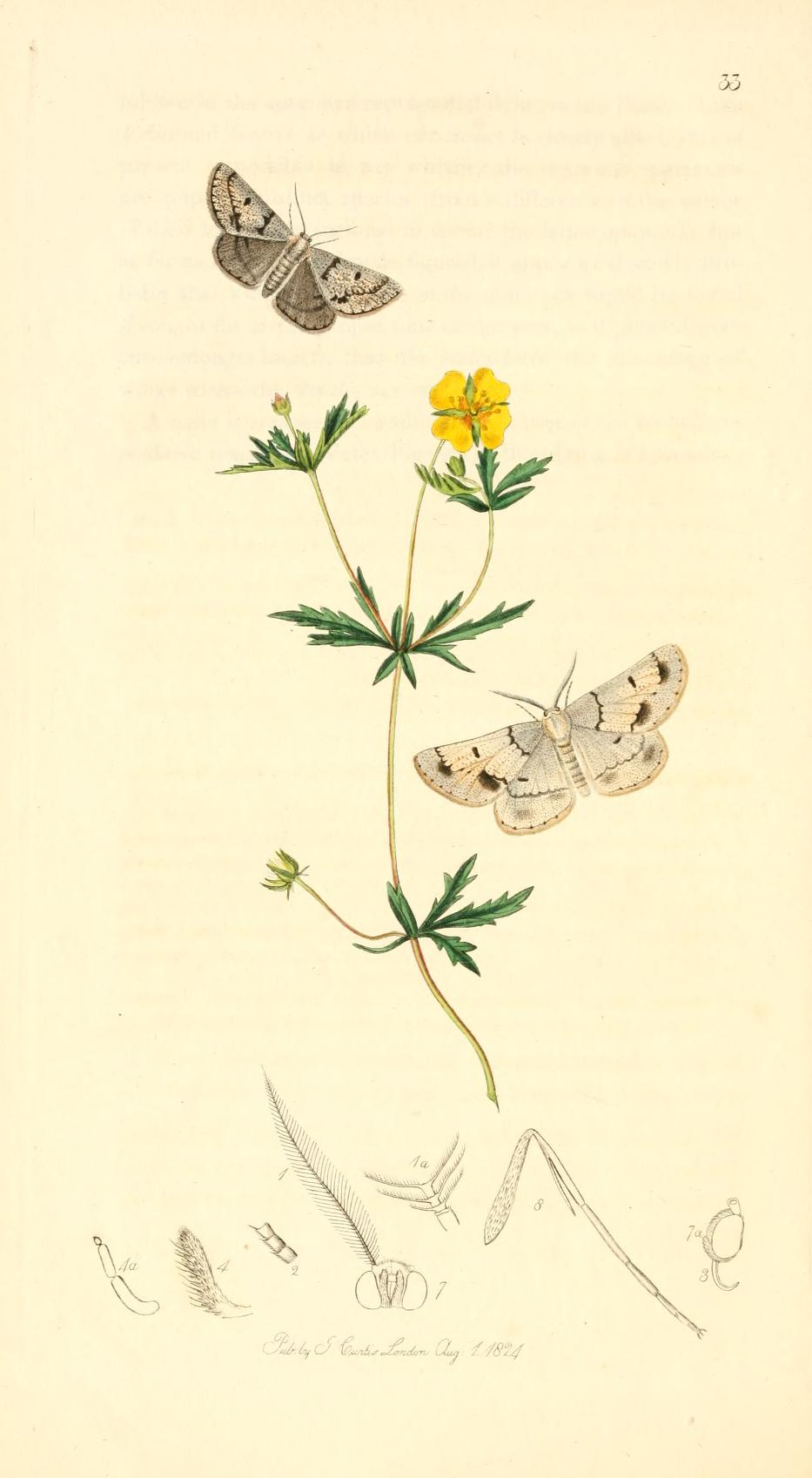
- Illustration from John Curtis's British Entomology Volume 1

Scientific classification
- Kingdom: Animalia
- Phylum: Arthropoda
- Class: Insecta
- Order: Lepidoptera
- Family: Geometridae
- Genus: Dyscia
- Species: D. fagaria

Binomial name
- Dyscia fagaria (Thunberg, 1784)

= Dyscia fagaria =

Grey scalloped bar

Species of moth

Dyscia fagaria, the grey scalloped bar, is a moth of the family Geometridae. The species was first described by Carl Peter Thunberg in 1784 and it can be found in Europe.

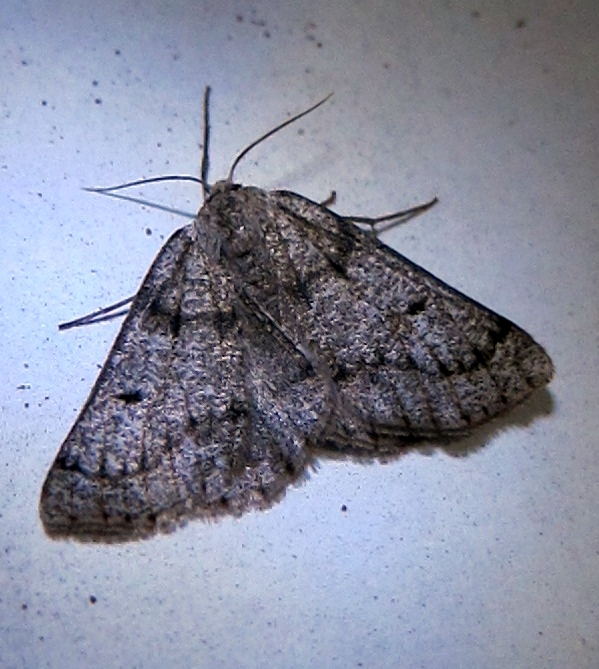

The wingspan is 31–40 mm (1.2–1.6 inches), the females are a bit smaller. The colour of the wings varies from whitish to brown. The outer cross line on the front wings consists of dark points (often connected) and is well developed. The interior cross line is similar to the outer, but only weakly implied in some specimens. The discal stain stands out clearly. The dark outer cross line of the forewings continues in attenuated form on the hindwings. There are fine black dots on the margins of all wings. Ab. alvarensis Wahlgren is rather a light form and weakly marked, the lines only distinct at the margins; ab.favillacearia Hbn. is cinereous, not densely irrorated, the lines somewhat broken into vein-dots, that of the hindwing almost or quite obsolete; ab. fleischmatini Rbl. is almost unicolorous black-grey; ab.psoficaria Ev. is a dark, densely irrorated form from the Ural, Transcaucasia and Transcaspia; ab.albidaria Stgr. is almost white, with little irroration, markings strong. The larva is dungy brown, with a whitish dorsal stripe and some grey markings on the sides.

The species occurs mainly in north central Europe and eastwards to the Urals, predominantly in sandy heathland habitats.

It has been found in open moorland, heathland and peat bogs in many areas in the north of England and Wales, in Scotland and in Ireland. It also has been found in the very south of England.

The moths fly from June to July, or earlier, depending on the location.

The larvae feed on heather (Calluna) and heath (Erica) species.
