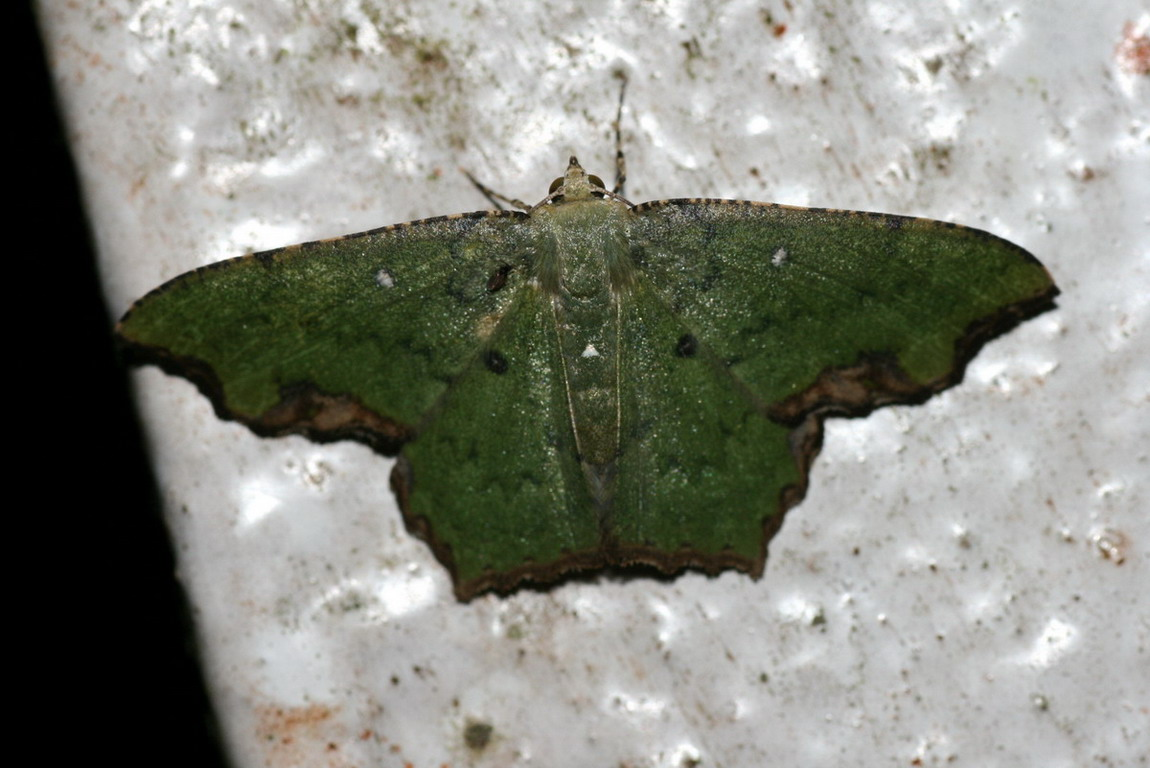

Scientific classification
- Kingdom: Animalia
- Phylum: Arthropoda
- Clade: Pancrustacea
- Class: Insecta
- Order: Lepidoptera
- Family: Geometridae
- Genus: Dooabia
- Species: D. puncticostata

Binomial name
- Dooabia puncticostata Prout, 1923

= Dooabia puncticostata =

Species of moth

Dooabia puncticostata is a species of moth of the family Geometridae first described by Louis Beethoven Prout in 1923. It is found in Sundaland.
