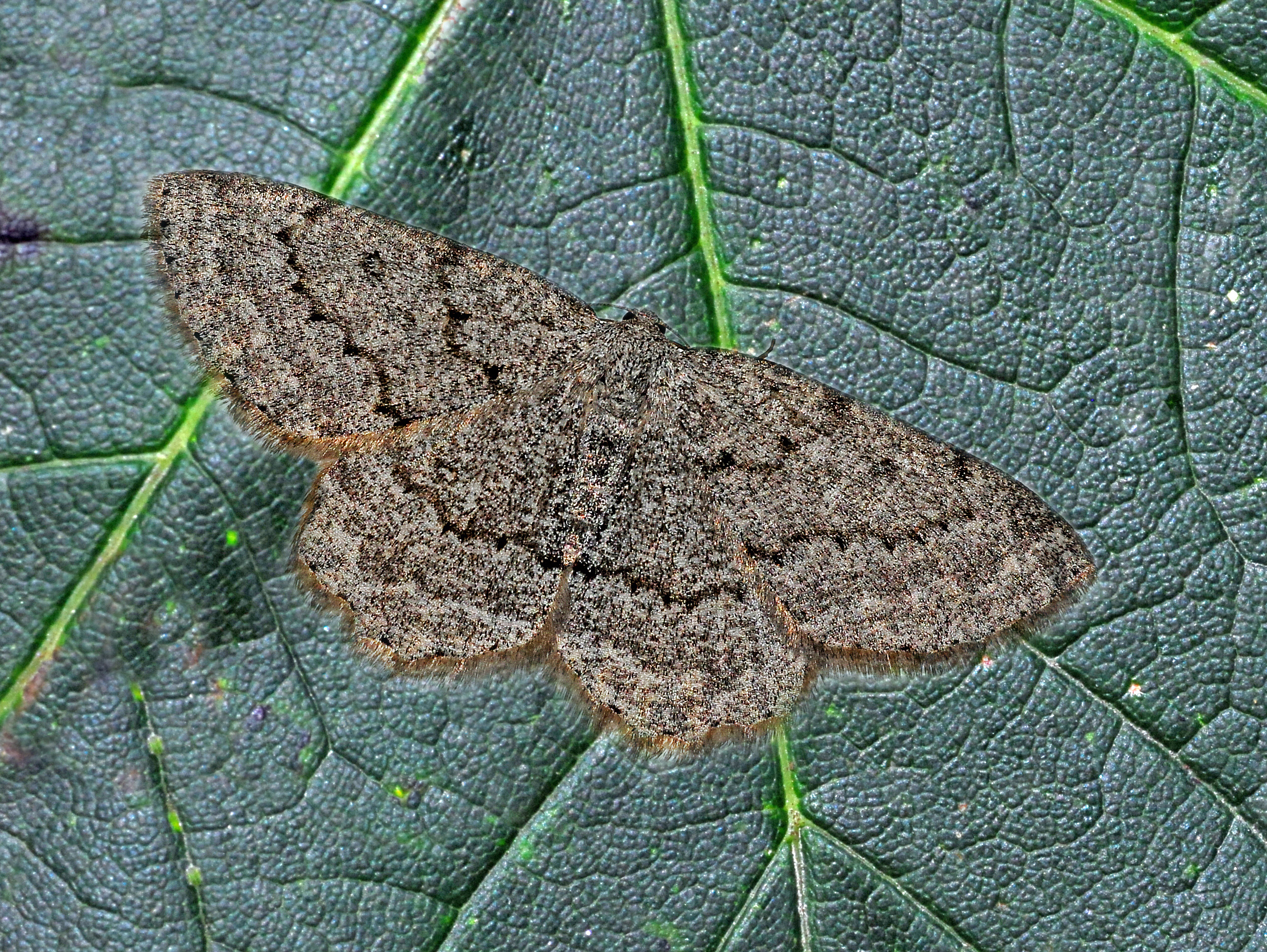

Scientific classification
- Kingdom: Animalia
- Phylum: Arthropoda
- Class: Insecta
- Order: Lepidoptera
- Family: Geometridae
- Genus: Charissa
- Species: C. ambiguata

Binomial name
- Charissa ambiguata (Duponchel, 1830)

Synonyms
- Kemtrognophos ambiguata Duponchel, 1830; Gnophos ambiguatus Duponchel, 1830

= Charissa ambiguata =

Species of moth

Charissa ambiguata is a species of moth that belongs to the genus Charissa.

== Etymology ==
The species name ambiguata derives from the Latin word "ambiguus", meraning doubtful, uncertain, probably so named for the difficulty of distinguishing this species.

== Subspecies ==
Subspecies include:

- Charissa ambiguata ambiguata (Duponchel, 1830)
- Charissa ambiguata graecaria (Staudinger, 1861)
- Charissa ambiguata pullularia (Herrich-Schaffer, 1856)
- Charissa ambiguata tatrensis (Vojnits, 1969)

== Distribution ==
This species is native to Eurasia. It is widespread in most of the mountains of Europe up to more than 2500 m of altitude. It frequents the surroundings of fir forests in cool and humid places.

== Description ==
Charissa ambiguata can reach a wingspan of 28–31 mm (1.1–1.2 in). It can easily be confused with other "stone moths", especially with Elophos dilucidaria. However the genitalia in both sexes show marked differences compared to all externally similar species.

This moth is very variable, with a gray-brownish background crossed by two transversal lines and ocelli with a faded appearance. Male shows filiform antennae.

== Biology ==
This species fly from May to September. The imago is sometimes active during the day but it also comes to light. Larva of this polyphagous species mainly feeds on Sedum, Artemisia, Taraxacum, Campanula, and Plantago species, on Rubus idaeus, Polygala chamaebuxus, Vaccinium myrtillus and Vaccinium uliginosum. The caterpillar overwinters.
