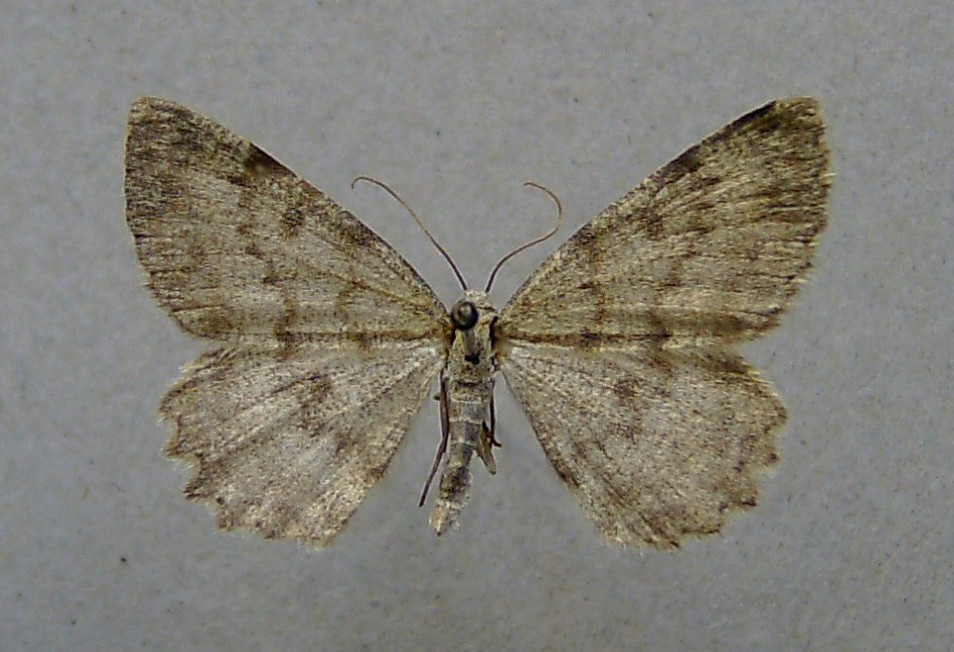

Scientific classification
- Domain: Eukaryota
- Kingdom: Animalia
- Phylum: Arthropoda
- Class: Insecta
- Order: Lepidoptera
- Family: Geometridae
- Genus: Charissa
- Species: C. glaucinaria

Binomial name
- Charissa glaucinaria (Hübner, 1799)

Synonyms
- Geometra glaucinaria Hübner, 1799; Gnophos fischeri Wehrli, 1934; Gnophos intermediaria Turati, 1919; Gnophos juravolans Wehrli, 1924; Gnophos peruni Varga, 1975; Gnophos salvatorensis Schwingenschuss, 1942

= Charissa glaucinaria =

Species of moth

Charissa glaucinaria is a moth of the family Geometridae first described by Jacob Hübner in 1799. It is found in the mountains of central and southern Europe. In the east, it ranges to Turkey, Ukraine and Georgia. In the Alps it is found at altitudes of over 2,000 meters.

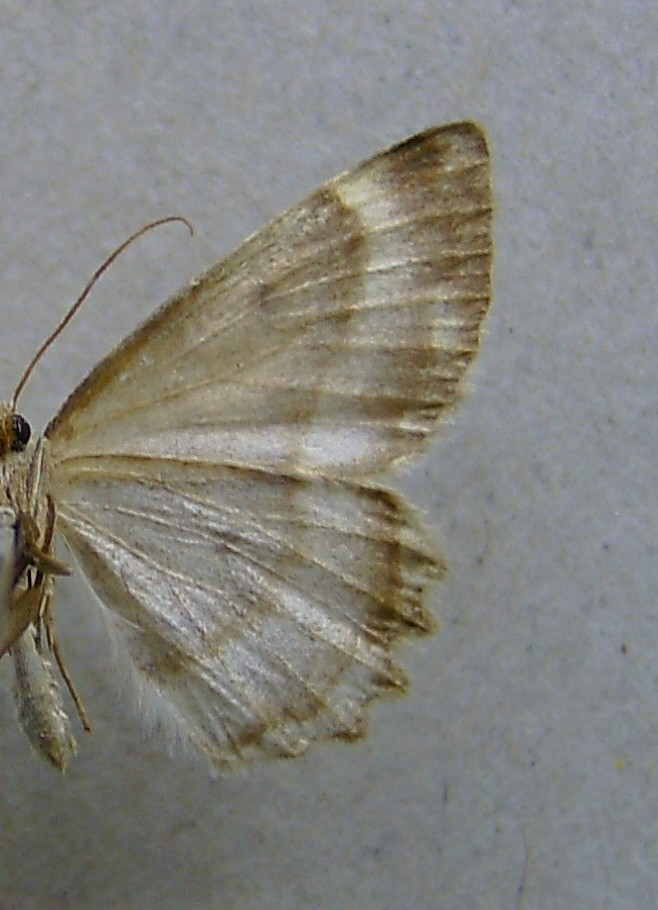
Underside

The wingspan is 30–36 mm. There are up to three generations per year with adults on wing from May to June, July to September and up to November.

The larvae feed on various plants, including Sedum album, Silene and Campanula species.

== Subspecies ==
- Charissa glaucinaria glaucinaria
- Charissa glaucinaria fischeri Wehrli 1934
- Charissa glaucinaria intermediaria Turati, 1919
- Charissa glaucinaria juravolans Wehrli, 1924
- Charissa glaucinaria peruni Varga, 1975
- Charissa glaucinaria salvatorensis Schwingenschuss, 1942
