= Dyscia atlantica =

Scientific classification
- Domain: Eukaryota
- Kingdom: Animalia
- Phylum: Arthropoda
- Class: Insecta
- Order: Lepidoptera
- Family: Geometridae
- Genus: Dyscia
- Species: D. atlantica

Binomial name
- Dyscia atlantica Reisser, 1933

Synonyms
- Dyscia (Scodiona) hispanaria atlantica Reisser, 1933

Species of moth

Dyscia atlantica is a species of moth from the family Geometridae. The scientific name of this species was first published in 1933 by Reisser. It is found in Morocco.

Larvae have been reared on Artemisia campestris.
