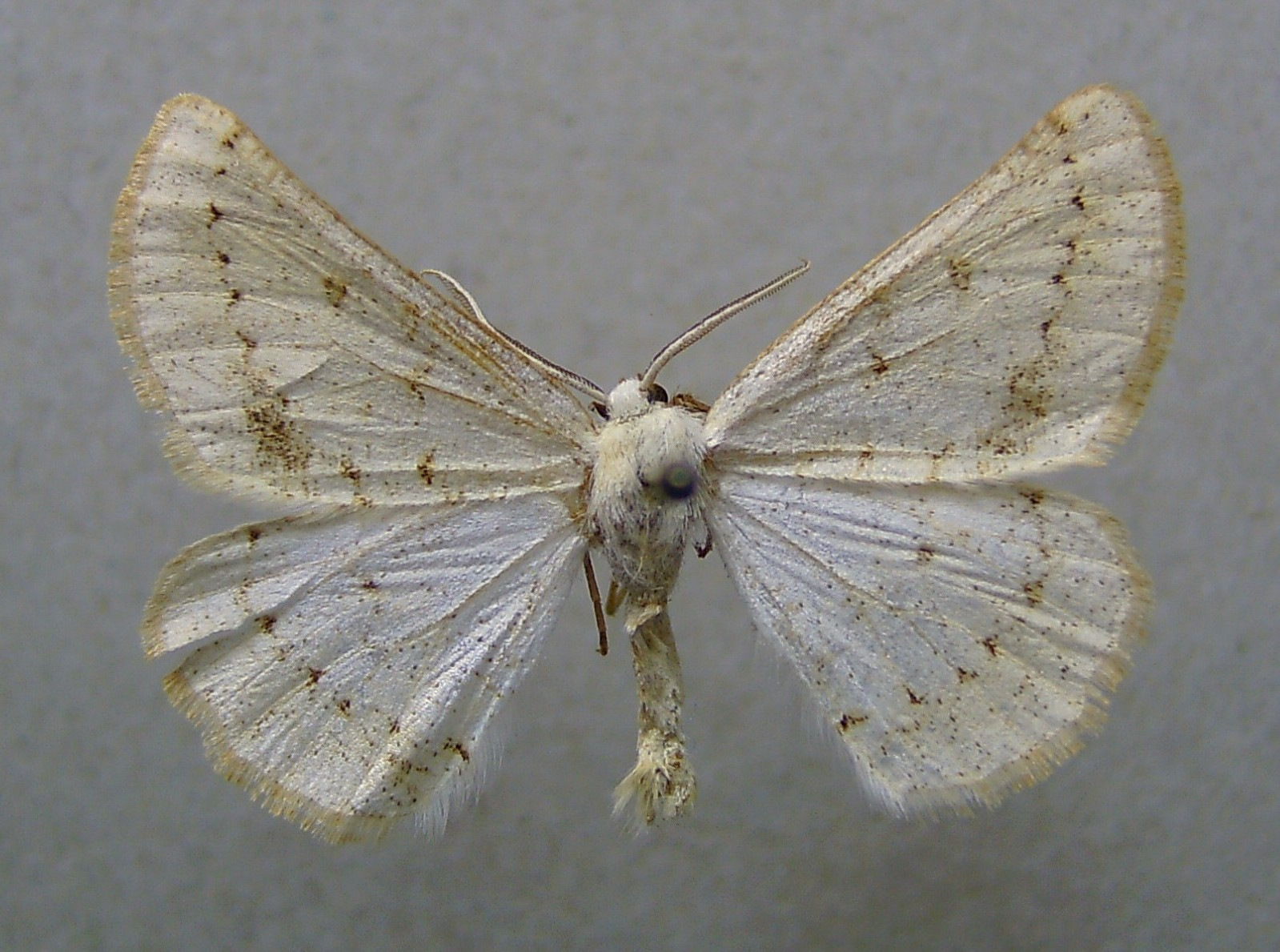

Scientific classification
- Domain: Eukaryota
- Kingdom: Animalia
- Phylum: Arthropoda
- Class: Insecta
- Order: Lepidoptera
- Family: Geometridae
- Genus: Dyscia
- Species: D. conspersaria

Binomial name
- Dyscia conspersaria (Denis & Schiffermüller, 1775)

Synonyms
- Geometra conspersaria Denis & Schiffermüller, 1775; Geometra conspersaria Hubner, 1799; Phalaena cunicularia Esper, 1803; Phalaena cuniculina Hubner, 1790; Scodiona turturaria Boisduval, 1840; Dyscia sultanica Wehrli, 1936; Scodiona conspersaria turturaria Boisduval, 1840

= Dyscia conspersaria =

Species of moth

Dyscia conspersaria is a moth of the family Geometridae first described by Michael Denis and Ignaz Schiffermüller in 1755. It is found in south-eastern Central Europe and Asia Minor.

The wingspan is 28–33 mm. They are a white color with brown and yellow spots on the wings. Adults are on wing from May to July in one generation per year.

The larvae feed on the leaves of Salvia and Artemisia species. The species overwinters in the pupal stage.

== Subspecies ==
- Drysia conspersaria conspersaria
- Drysia conspersaria sultanica Wehrli, 1936 (Asia Minor)
- Drysia conspersaria turturaria (Boisduval, 1840) (France)
