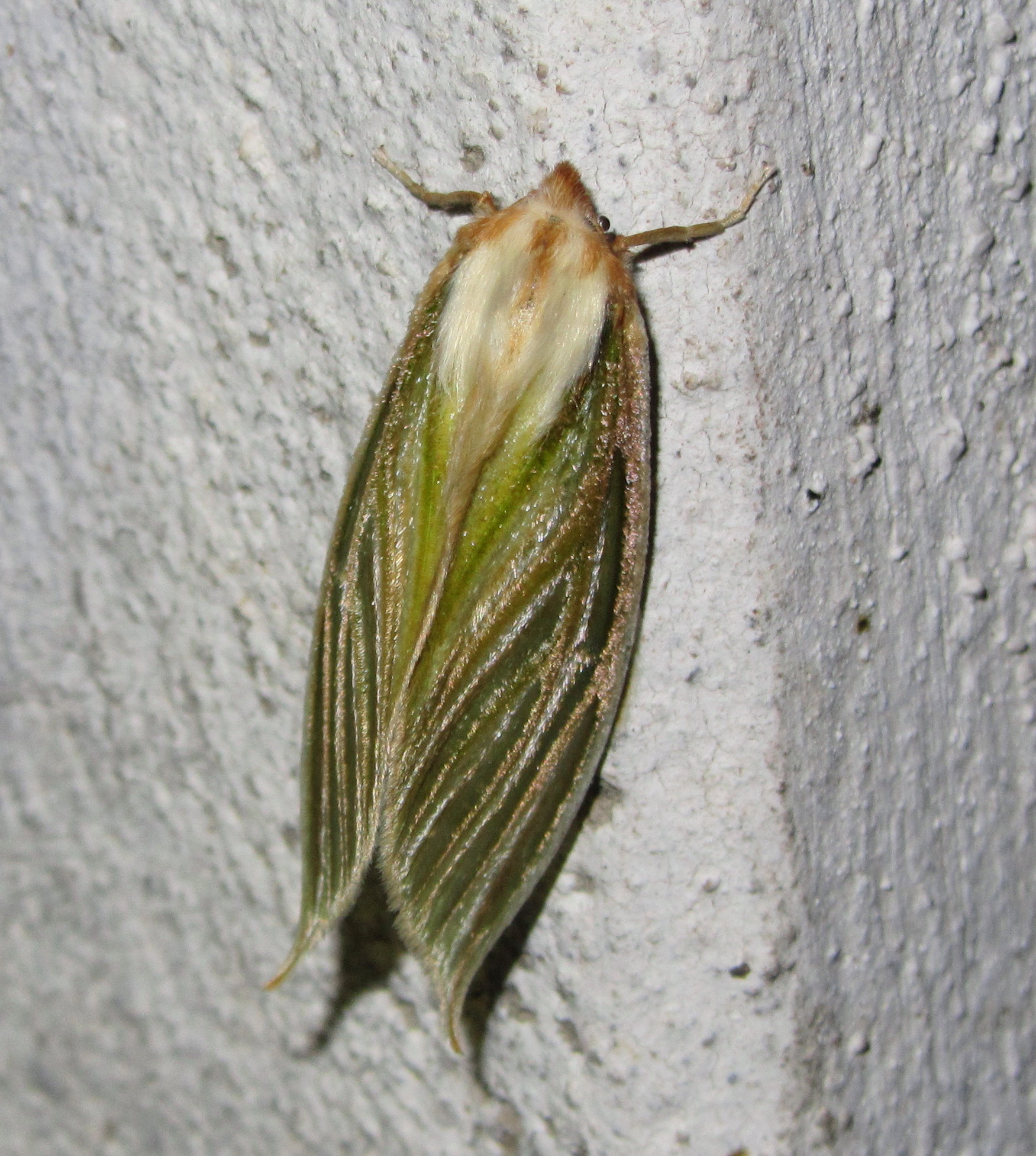

Scientific classification
- Kingdom: Animalia
- Phylum: Arthropoda
- Class: Insecta
- Order: Lepidoptera
- Family: Geometridae
- Genus: Doratoptera
- Species: D. nicevillei

Binomial name
- Doratoptera nicevillei Hampson, 1895

= Doratoptera nicevillei =

Species of moth

Doratoptera nicevillei is a species of moth in the family Geometridae native to India (Sikkim) and Bhutan, first described by George Francis Hampson in 1895.

== Description ==
It is a large moth with a wingspan of 60mm, a pale ochre color and a brownish head. Both wings are moderately robust, very glossy, and whitish-ochre in color. The forewing has pale golden-brown streaks on the costal margin, veins, and intercostal spaces, which become finer at the folds.
