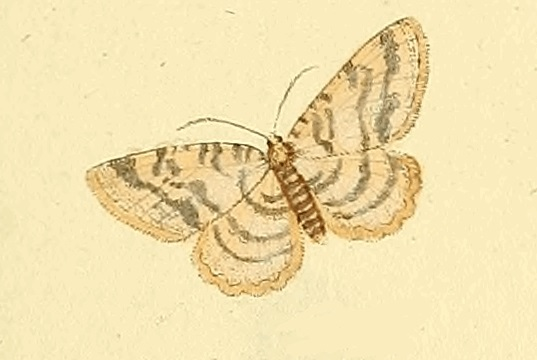

Scientific classification
- Domain: Eukaryota
- Kingdom: Animalia
- Phylum: Arthropoda
- Class: Insecta
- Order: Lepidoptera
- Family: Geometridae
- Genus: Charissa
- Species: C. mucidaria

Binomial name
- Charissa mucidaria (Hübner, [1799])

Synonyms
- Geometra mucidaria Hübner, 1799; Euchrognophos mucidaria; Gnophos lusitanica Mendes, 1903; Gnophos ochracearia Staudinger, 1901; Gnophos grisearia Prout, 1915; Gnophos nubilarius Reisser, 1936

= Charissa mucidaria =

Species of moth

Charissa mucidaria, the coppery taupe, is a moth of the family Geometridae. It was described by Jacob Hübner in 1799. It is found in southern Europe and North Africa (including Morocco).

The wingspan is 20–30 mm. Adults are on wing from March to May and again from July to September.

The larvae feed on Sedum, Anagallis, Polygonum and Rumex species.
