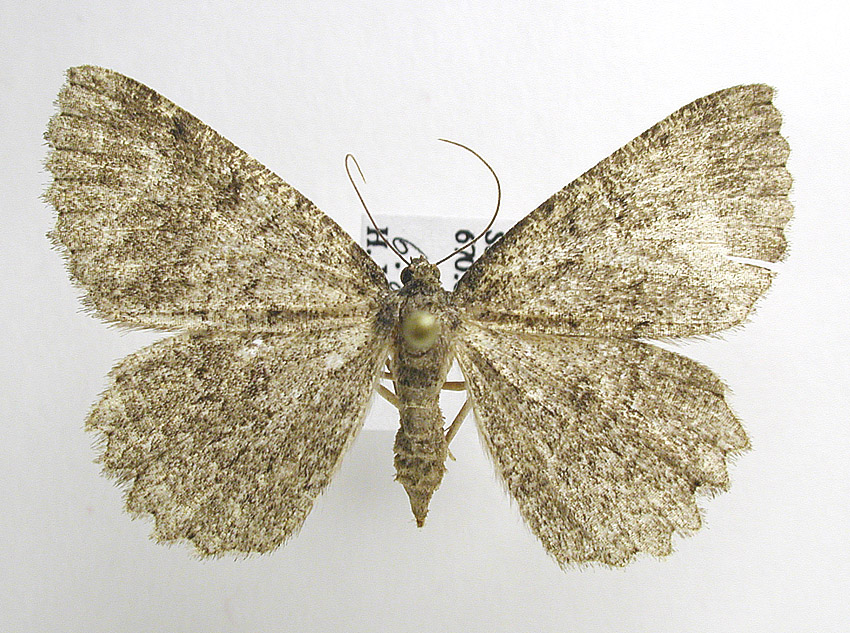

Scientific classification
- Kingdom: Animalia
- Phylum: Arthropoda
- Clade: Pancrustacea
- Class: Insecta
- Order: Lepidoptera
- Family: Geometridae
- Genus: Charissa
- Species: C. obscurata

Binomial name
- Charissa obscurata (Denis & Schiffermüller, 1775)

Synonyms
- Geometra obscurata Denis & Schiffermüller, 1775; Geometra obscuraria Hübner, [1799]; Gnophos obscuratus

= Charissa obscurata =

Species of moth

Charissa obscurata, the annulet or Scotch annulet, is a moth of the family Geometridae. The species was first described by Michael Denis and Ignaz Schiffermüller in 1775. It is found in most of Europe including the European part of Russia and in Asia Minor, the Caucasus, Armenia and Azerbaijan. In the mountains it rises up to 1800 meters. The habitat is rocky dry grasslands, boulder corridors, quarries as well as rocky steppe heaths and wine-growing areas.

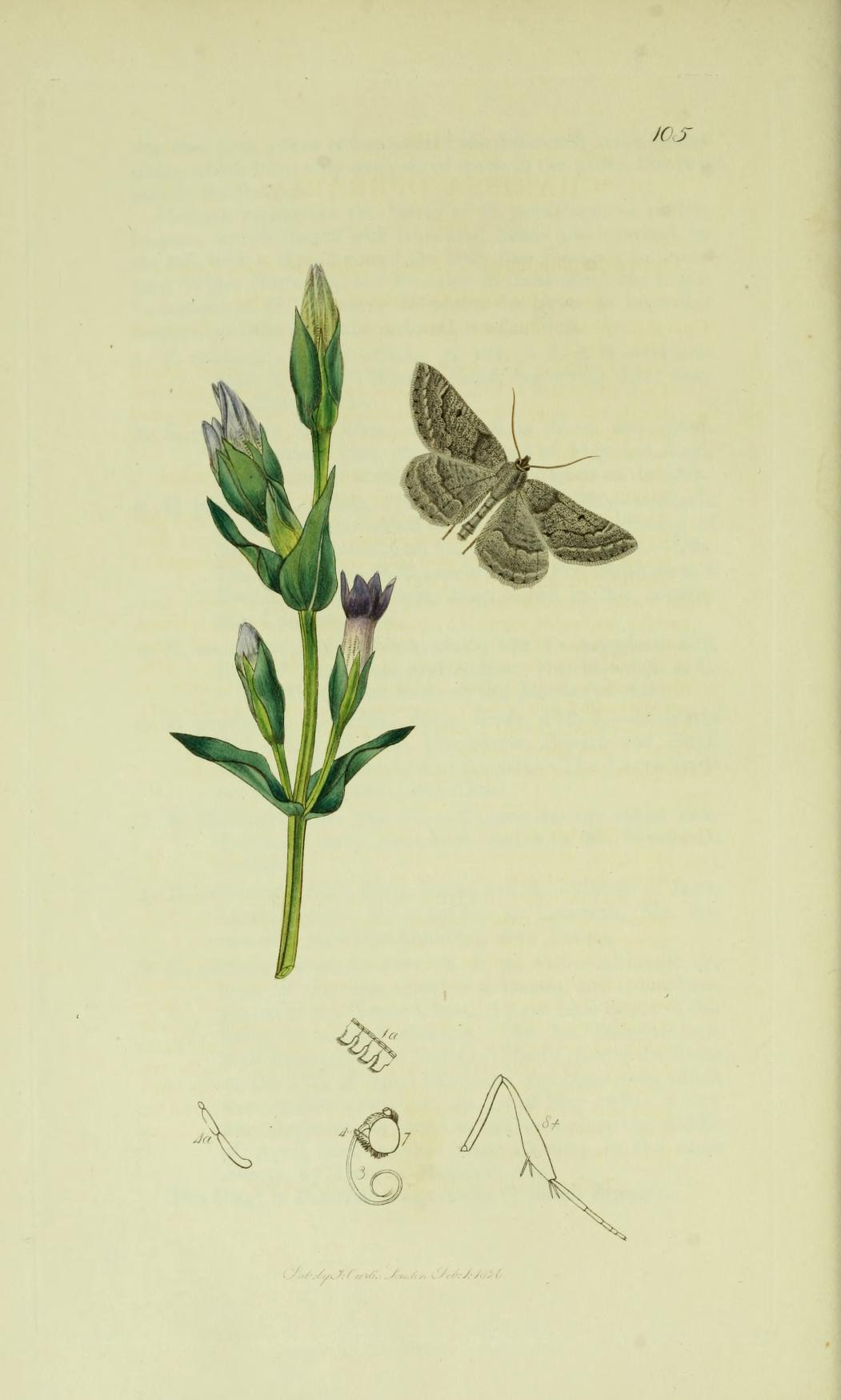
Illustration from John Curtis's British Entomology Volume 6

The wingspan is 27–32 mm. The circular O marks on all four wings are typical but may be vague. The forewings have strongly toothed lines, whose which continue on the hindwings. The margin of the large hindwing is very heavily ruffled and incised, which differ from other species of Charissa moths. The larva is smooth and grey-brown.

Adults are on wing from July to August.

The larvae feed on various herbaceous plants, including Calluna species, Viscaria vulgaris, Sedum telephium and Rubus species.

== Melanism and evolution ==
The British entomologist Albert Brydges Farn (1841–1921) wrote to Charles Darwin on 18 November 1878 about his observation that colour variations in the annulet moth related to soil colour. He suggested this was an example of "survival of the fittest", and added that he had found dark moths on a chalk slope where foliage had been blackened by smoke from lime kilns. This was an early observation of industrial melanism, but Darwin does not seem to have responded.
