= Dasyboarmia subpilosa =

Scientific classification
- Domain: Eukaryota
- Kingdom: Animalia
- Phylum: Arthropoda
- Class: Insecta
- Order: Lepidoptera
- Family: Geometridae
- Genus: Dasyboarmia
- Species: D. subpilosa

Binomial name
- Dasyboarmia subpilosa (Warren, 1894)

Synonyms
- Hemerophila subpilosa Warren, 1894; Hemerophila canidorsata instigata Prout, 1929; Metamenophra canidorsata Walker, 1866; Menophra subpilosa Warren; Sato, 1987

Species of moth

Dasyboarmia subpilosa is a moth of the family Geometridae. It is found in India (NE Himalaya), Thailand, Peninsular Malaysia, Sumatra, Borneo, Philippines, Sulawesi and Buru.
