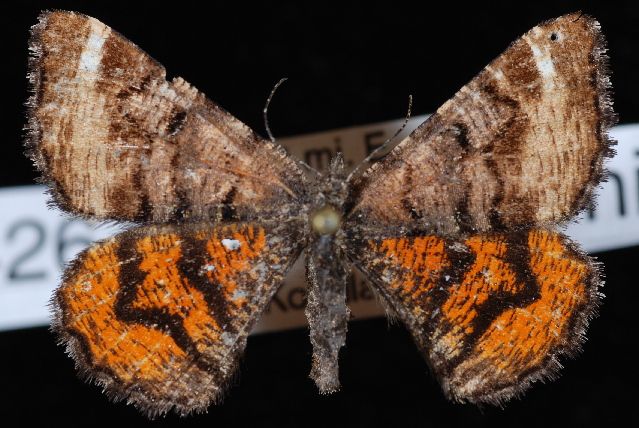

Scientific classification
- Kingdom: Animalia
- Phylum: Arthropoda
- Clade: Pancrustacea
- Class: Insecta
- Order: Lepidoptera
- Family: Geometridae
- Tribe: Boarmiini
- Genus: Dasyfidonia
- Species: D. avuncularia

Binomial name
- Dasyfidonia avuncularia (Guenée in Boisduval & Guenée, 1858)

= Dasyfidonia avuncularia =

Species of moth

Dasyfidonia avuncularia, the red-winged wave, is a species of geometrid moth in the family Geometridae. It is found in North America.

The MONA or Hodges number for Dasyfidonia avuncularia is 6426.
