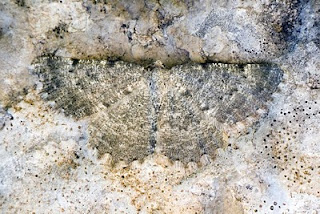

Scientific classification
- Domain: Eukaryota
- Kingdom: Animalia
- Phylum: Arthropoda
- Class: Insecta
- Order: Lepidoptera
- Family: Geometridae
- Genus: Charissa
- Species: C. pullata

Binomial name
- Charissa pullata (Denis & Schiffermüller, 1775)

Synonyms
- Geometra pullata Denis & Schiffermuller, 1775; Gnophos pullata; Gnophos albarinata Milliere, 1859; Gnophos impectinata Guenee, 1858; Gnophos kovacsi Vojnits, 1967

= Charissa pullata =

Species of moth

Charissa pullata is a moth of the family Geometridae. It is found in Spain, France, Belgium, Germany, Switzerland, Italy (including Sicily), Slovenia, Austria, the Czech Republic, Poland, Slovakia, Hungary, Romania, Serbia and Montenegro, Bulgaria, North Macedonia, Albania and Greece.

The wingspan is about 30 mm. Adults are on wing from the beginning of June to mid August in one generation per year.

The larvae feed on Asplenium ruta-muraria, Lonicera xylosteum, Rubus idaeus, Sarothamnus scoparius and Thymus pulegioides. They overwinter in the larval stage.

== Subspecies ==
- Charissa pullata pullata
- Charissa pullata albarinata Milliere, 1859
- Charissa pullata impectinata Guenee, 1858
- Charissa pullata kovacsi Vojnits, 1967
