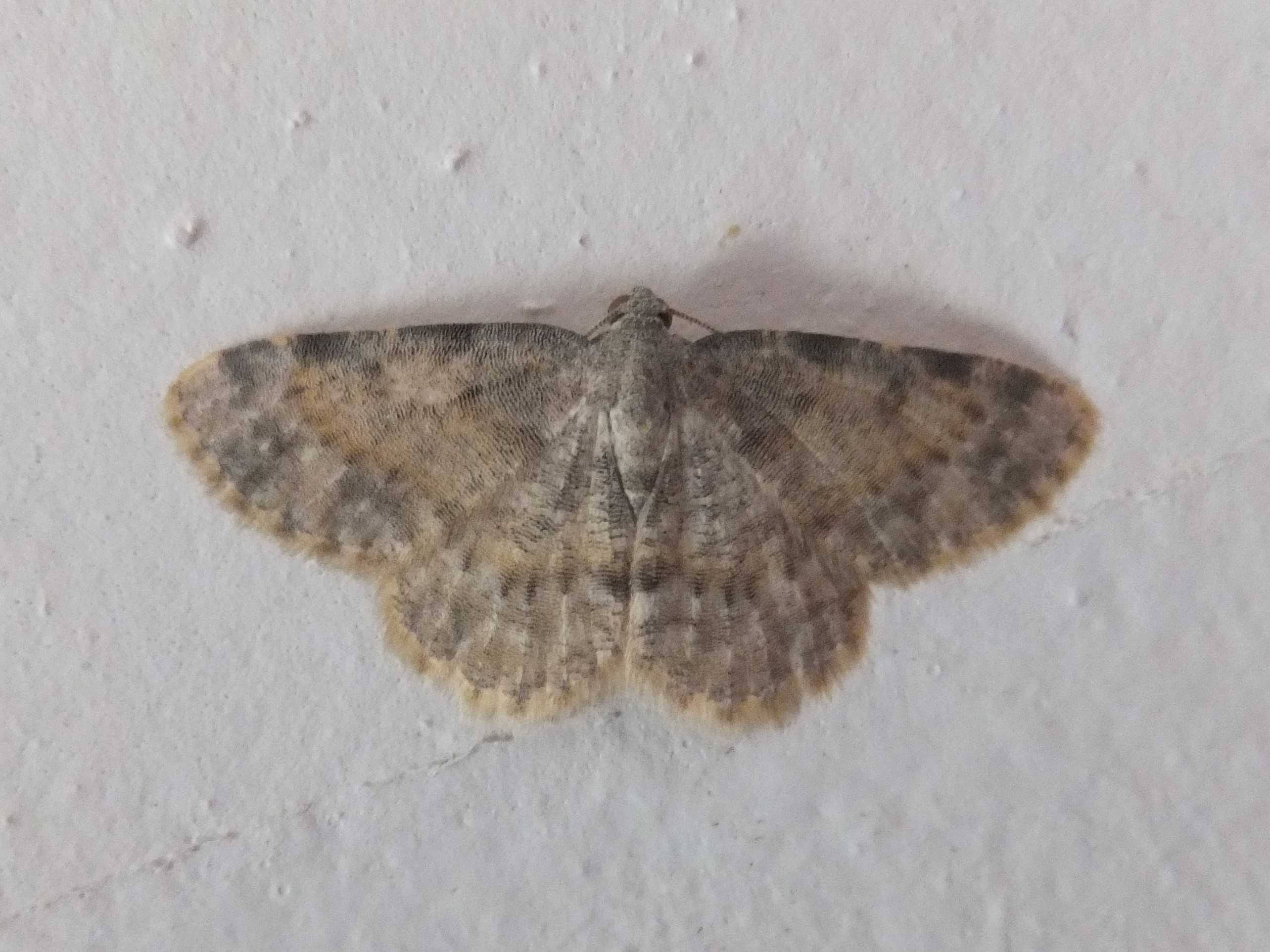

Scientific classification
- Domain: Eukaryota
- Kingdom: Animalia
- Phylum: Arthropoda
- Class: Insecta
- Order: Lepidoptera
- Family: Geometridae
- Genus: Charissa
- Species: C. variegata

Binomial name
- Charissa variegata (Duponchel, 1830)

Synonyms
- Gnophos variegata Duponchel, 1830; Euchrognophos variegata; Gnophos corneliata Milliere, 1873; Gnophos cymbalariata Milliere, 1869; Gnophos cava Vojnits, 1968; Gnophos rothschildi Prout, 1929; Gnophos sicula Wehrli 1931

= Charissa variegata =

Etched taupe

Species of moth

Charissa variegata, the etched taupe, is a moth of the family Geometridae. It was described by Philogène Auguste Joseph Duponchel in 1830. It is found in France, the Iberian Peninsula, Switzerland, Austria, Italy, the Balkan Peninsula and Ukraine.

The wingspan is 20–30 mm.

The larvae feed on Carex, Thymus, Sedum and Chamaecytisus species.

== Subspecies ==
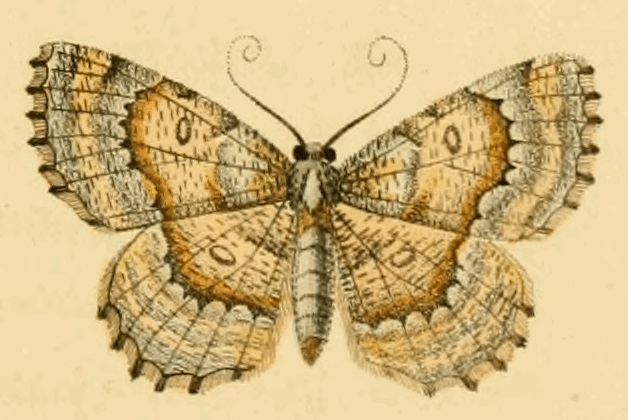
Illustration

- Charissa variegata variegata
- Charissa cava (Vojnits, 1968)
- Charissa rothschildi (Prout, 1929)
