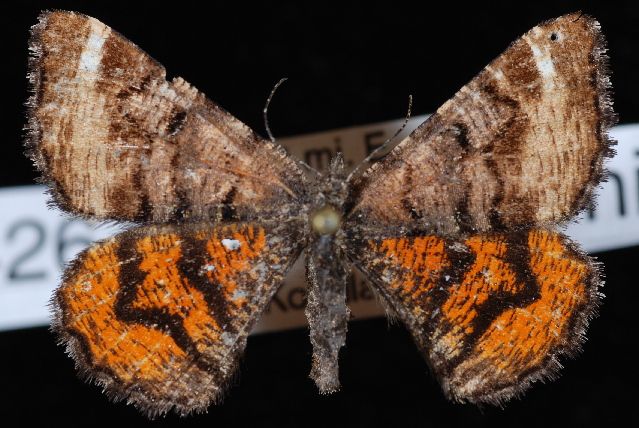
- Dasyfidonia avuncularia

Scientific classification
- Kingdom: Animalia
- Phylum: Arthropoda
- Clade: Pancrustacea
- Class: Insecta
- Order: Lepidoptera
- Family: Geometridae
- Tribe: Boarmiini
- Genus: Dasyfidonia; Packard, 1876

= Dasyfidonia =

Genus of moths

Dasyfidonia is a genus of moths in the family Geometridae.

== Species ==
- Dasyfidonia avuncularia (Guenée, 1857)
- Dasyfidonia macdunnoughi Guedet, 1935
