= Doloma =

Scientific classification
- Kingdom: Animalia
- Phylum: Arthropoda
- Clade: Pancrustacea
- Class: Insecta
- Order: Lepidoptera
- Family: Geometridae
- Subfamily: Geometrinae
- Genus: Doloma; L. B. Prout, 1922

Genus of moths

Doloma is a monotypic moth genus in the family Geometridae. Its only species, Doloma leucocephala, is known from Madagascar. Both the genus and species were first described by Louis Beethoven Prout in 1922.
