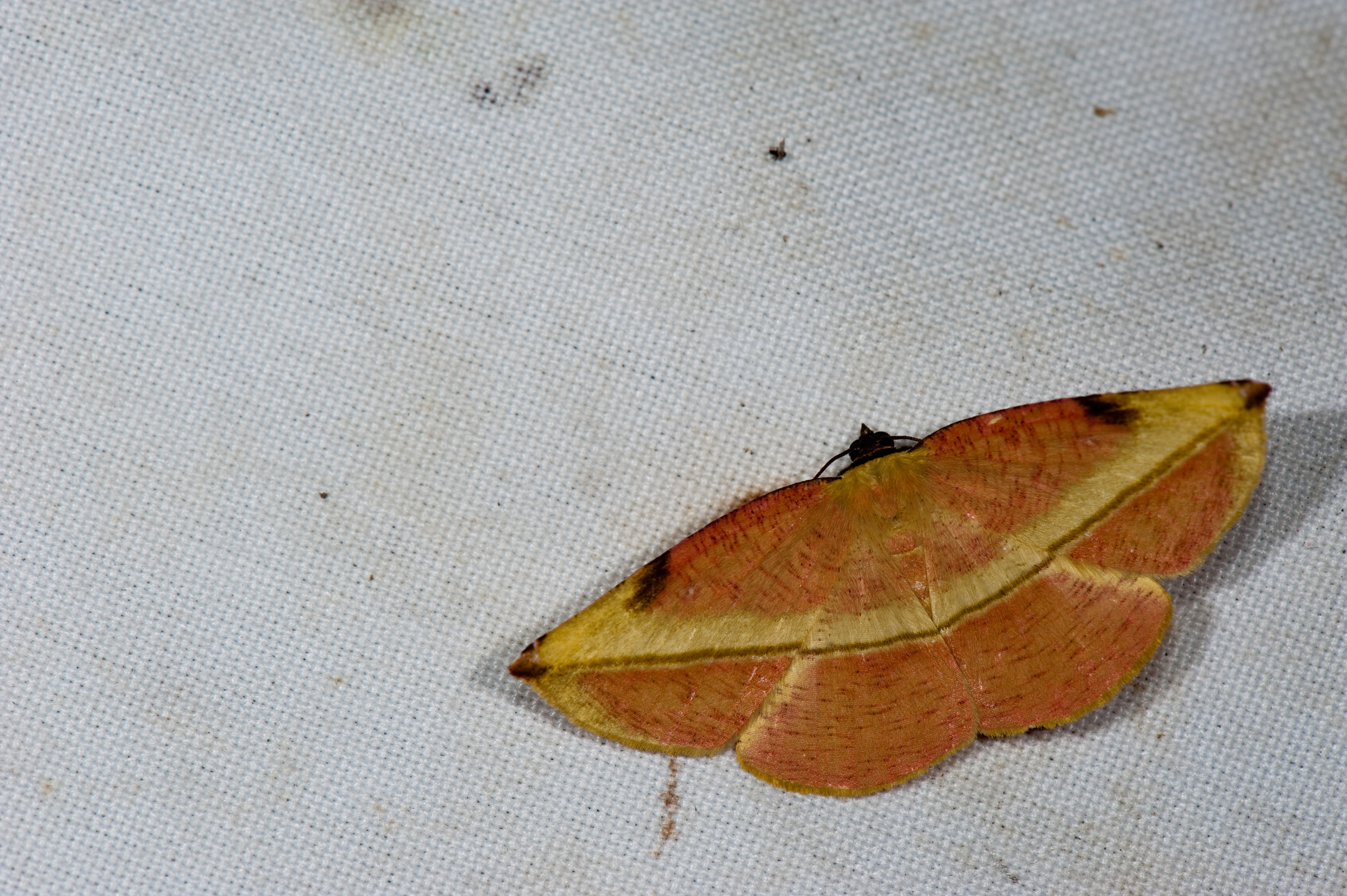
- Dissoplaga flava changi

Scientific classification
- Kingdom: Animalia
- Phylum: Arthropoda
- Clade: Pancrustacea
- Class: Insecta
- Order: Lepidoptera
- Family: Geometridae
- Subfamily: Ennominae
- Genus: Dissoplaga; Warren, 1894

= Dissoplaga =

Genus of moths

Dissoplaga is a genus of moths in the family Geometridae.

== Species ==
- Dissoplaga flava Moore, 1888
