= Dysnymphus =

Scientific classification
- Kingdom: Animalia
- Phylum: Arthropoda
- Clade: Pancrustacea
- Class: Insecta
- Order: Lepidoptera
- Family: Geometridae
- Subfamily: Ennominae
- Genus: Dysnymphus; Prout, 1915

Genus of moths

Dysnymphus is a genus of moths in the family Geometridae.

== Species ==
- Dysnymphus monostigma Prout, 1915
