= Dryochlora =

Scientific classification
- Kingdom: Animalia
- Phylum: Arthropoda
- Class: Insecta
- Order: Lepidoptera
- Family: Geometridae
- Subfamily: Geometrinae
- Genus: Dryochlora; D. S. Fletcher, 1979

Synonyms
- Idiochlora Prout, 1921

Genus of moths

Dryochlora is a genus of moths in the family Geometridae. It was first described by David Stephen Fletcher in 1979.

== Species ==
- Dryochlora cinctuta (Saalmüller, 1891)
- Dryochlora ophthalmicata Moore 1867
