= Mallomus =

Scientific classification
- Kingdom: Animalia
- Phylum: Arthropoda
- Clade: Pancrustacea
- Class: Insecta
- Order: Lepidoptera
- Family: Geometridae
- Genus: Mallomus

Synonyms
- Salpis Mabille, 1885; Lasiopsis Warren, 1895; Distagma Staudinger, 1899; Pseudosalpis Staudinger, 1899; Dasystole Warren, 1907; Antygophanes Prout, 1910; Microdontopera Prout, 1910

Genus of moths

Mallomus is a genus of moths in the family Geometridae.

== Species ==
- Mallomus aenea (Butler, 1882)
- Mallomus antennata (Mabille, 1885)
- Mallomus albipunctaria (Mabille, 1885)
- Mallomus scodionata (Mabille, 1885)
