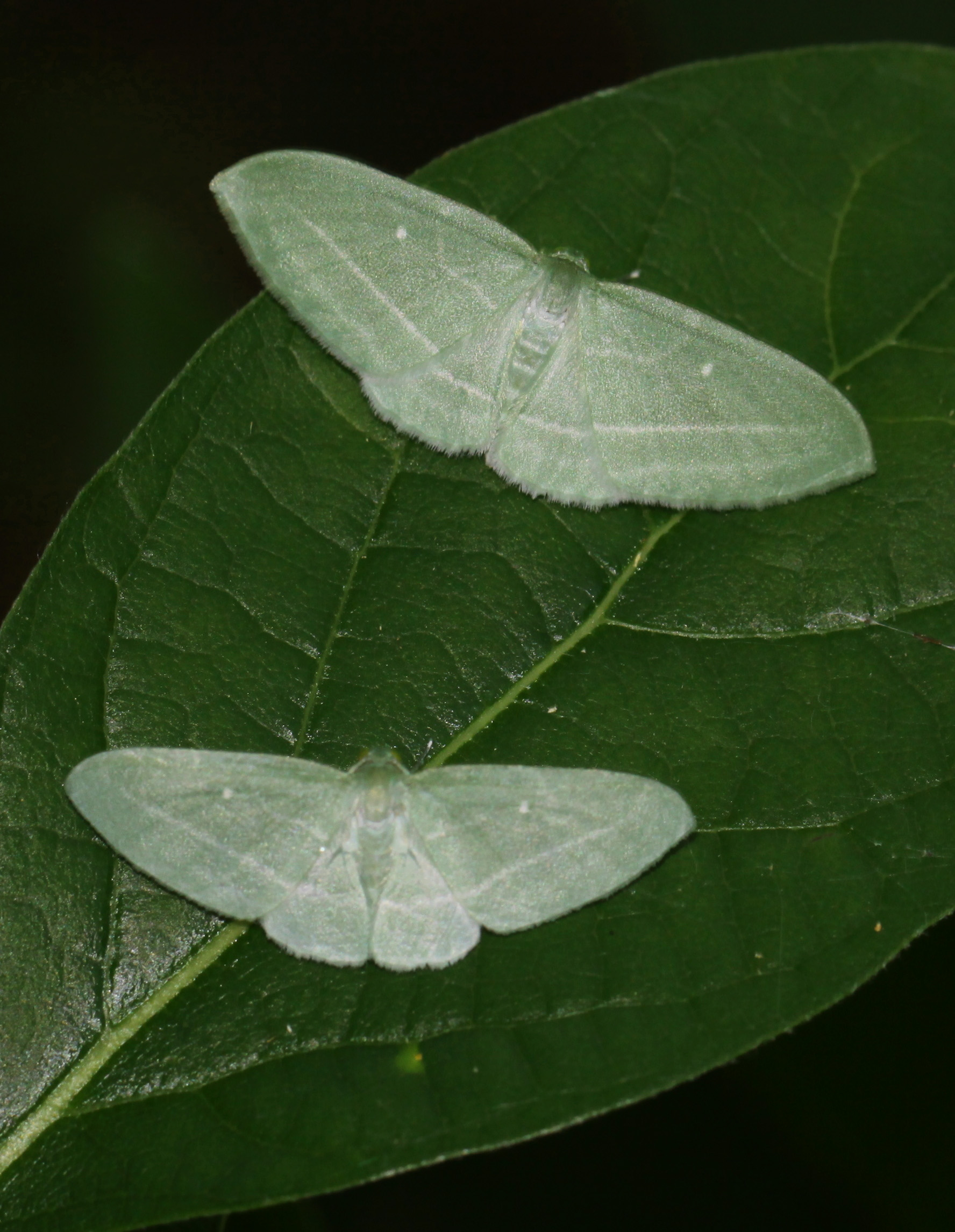

Scientific classification
- Kingdom: Animalia
- Phylum: Arthropoda
- Clade: Pancrustacea
- Class: Insecta
- Order: Lepidoptera
- Family: Geometridae
- Genus: Dyspteris; Hübner, 1818
- Species: D. abortivaria

Binomial name
- Dyspteris abortivaria (Herrich-Schaffer, 1855)

= Dyspteris =

Dyspteris abortivaria

Genus of moths

Dyspteris is a genus of moths in the family Geometridae and was erected by Jacob Hübner in 1818. It is monotypic, being represented by a single species, Dyspteris abortivaria, commonly known as the bad-wing. This species was first described by Gottlieb August Wilhelm Herrich-Schäffer in 1855 and is found in North America.

It is called "bad-wing" because its forewing is much larger than its hindwing, making it often difficult to pull into position for spreading.

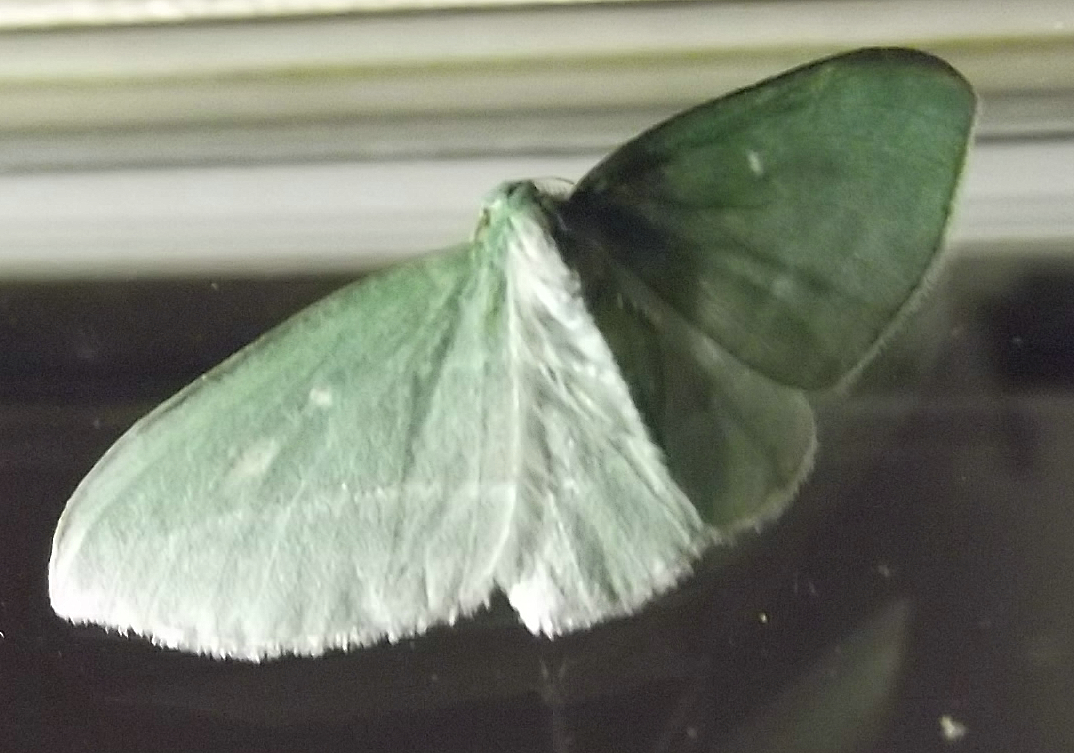
The bad-wing, Dyspteris abortivaria
