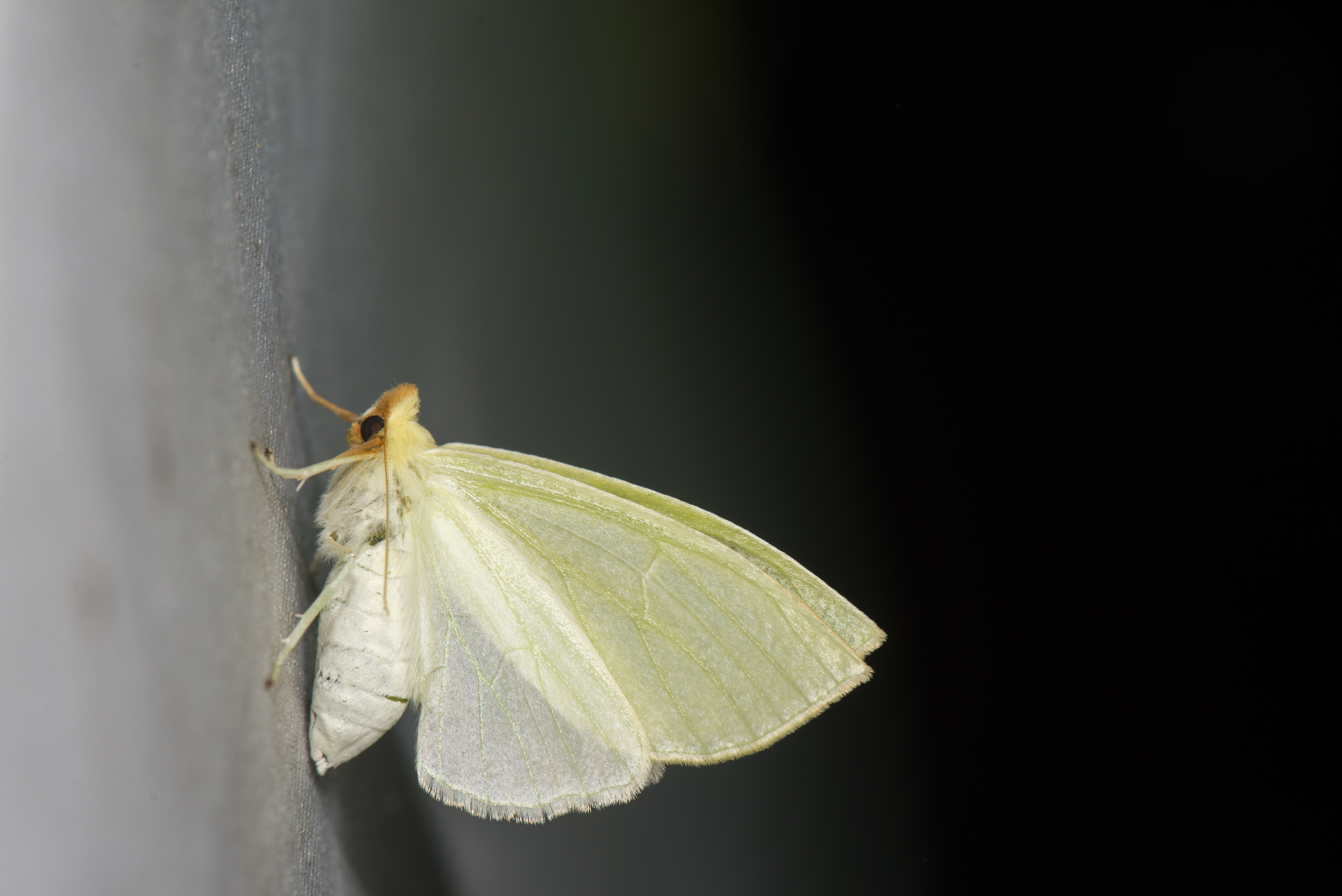
- Doratoptera lutea

Scientific classification
- Kingdom: Animalia
- Phylum: Arthropoda
- Class: Insecta
- Order: Lepidoptera
- Family: Geometridae
- Subfamily: Ennominae
- Genus: Doratoptera

= Doratoptera =

Genus of moths

Doratoptera is a genus of moths in the family Geometridae. It was discovered in 1895.

Catalogue of Life lists 4 accepted and 1 provisionally accepted species:

- Doratoptera amabilis (Yazaki, 1988)
- Doratoptera lutea (Kiriakoff, 1964)
- Doratoptera nicevillei (Hampson, 1895)
- Doratoptera virescens (Marumo, 1923)
- Doratoptera virescens (Matsumura, 1927) - provisionally accepted
