= Isochromodes =

Scientific classification
- Kingdom: Animalia
- Phylum: Arthropoda
- Class: Insecta
- Order: Lepidoptera
- Family: Geometridae
- Genus: Isochromodes

Genus of moths

Isochromodes is a genus of Lepidoptera in the family of Geometridae moths.
