= Drymoptila =

Scientific classification
- Kingdom: Animalia
- Phylum: Arthropoda
- Class: Insecta
- Order: Lepidoptera
- Family: Geometridae
- Subfamily: Ennominae
- Genus: Drymoptila; Guest, 1887

Genus of moths

Drymoptila is a genus of moths in the family Geometridae.

== Species ==
- Drymoptila temenitis Guest, 1887
