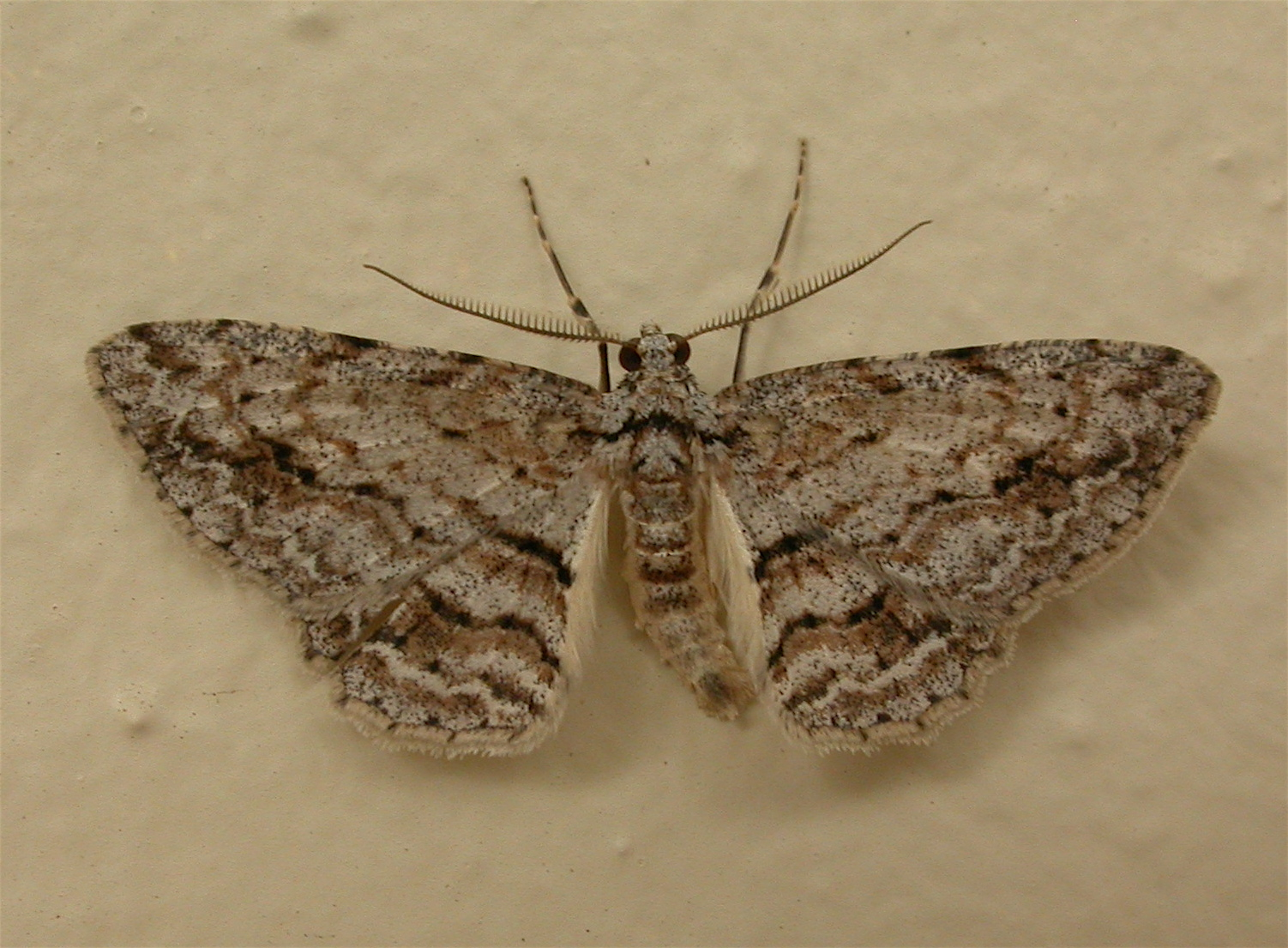

Scientific classification
- Kingdom: Animalia
- Phylum: Arthropoda
- Clade: Pancrustacea
- Class: Insecta
- Order: Lepidoptera
- Family: Geometridae
- Tribe: Boarmiini
- Genus: Didymoctenia; Warren, 1901
- Species: D. exsuperata

Binomial name
- Didymoctenia exsuperata (Walker, 1860)

Synonyms
- Boarmia exsuperata Walker, 1860; Tephrosia disposita Walker, 1860; Ectropis dicranucha Turner, 1947

= Didymoctenia =

Genus of moths

Didymoctenia is a monotypic genus of moths in the family Geometridae and subfamily Ennominae which was described by Warren in 1901. Its only species, Didymoctenia exsuperata, the thick-lined bark moth, was first described by Francis Walker in 1860. It is found in Australia.

== Life cycle ==
Early instar caterpillars are brownish white with varying dots with a brown head. As the caterpillar reaches its last instar it turns green and will be almost completely covered in small black dots.
