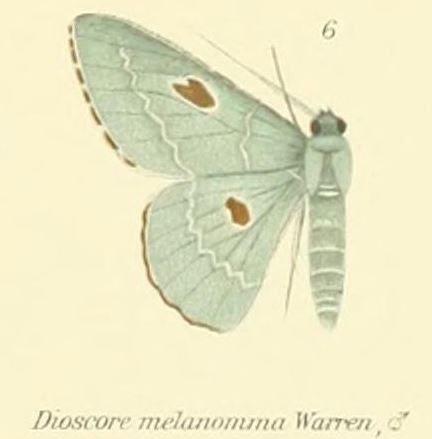

Scientific classification
- Kingdom: Animalia
- Phylum: Arthropoda
- Class: Insecta
- Order: Lepidoptera
- Family: Geometridae
- Subfamily: Geometrinae
- Genus: Dioscore; Warren, 1907

= Dioscore =

Genus of moths

Dioscore Warren, 1907 is a genus of moths in the family Geometridae.

== Species ==
These are the species belonging to this genus, according to Lindt, Lennuk & Viidalepp, 2017

- Dioscore ancyla Prout, 1924
- Dioscore bicolor (Warren, 1896)
- Dioscore fulgurata (Warren, 1897)
- Dioscore homoeotes Prout, 1911
- Dioscore kirke Lindt, Lennuk & Viidalepp, 2017
- Dioscore melanomma Warren, 1907
- Dioscore nereis (Warren, 1912)
- Dioscore punctifimbria (Warren, 1903)
- Dioscore thalassias (Warren, 1903)
- Dioscore vilu Lindt, Lennuk & Viidalepp, 2017
