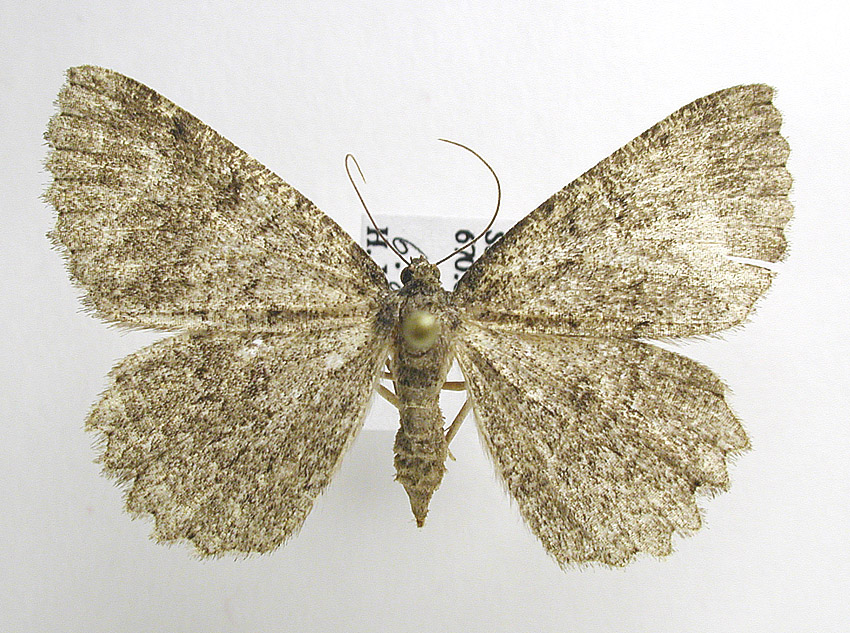
- Charissa obscurata

Scientific classification
- Domain: Eukaryota
- Kingdom: Animalia
- Phylum: Arthropoda
- Class: Insecta
- Order: Lepidoptera
- Family: Geometridae
- Subfamily: Ennominae
- Genus: Charissa; Curtis, 1826

Synonyms
- List: Dysgnophos; Euchrognophos; Hyposcotis; Kemtrognophos; Lycognophos; Neognophina; Organognophos; Rhopalognophos

= Charissa =

Genus of moths

Charissa is a genus of moths in the family Geometridae.

== Species ==
- Charissa adjectaria Staudinger, 1897
- Charissa ambiguata (Duponchel, 1830)
- Charissa annubilata Christoph, 1885
- Charissa anthina Wehrli, 1953
- Charissa asymmetra Wehrli, 1939
- Charissa avilarius (Reisser, 1936)
- Charissa bellieri (Oberthür, 1913)
- Charissa bidentatus (Stshetkin & Viidalepp, 1980)
- Charissa bundeli (Stshetkin & Viidalepp, 1980)
- Charissa canariensis
- Charissa certhiatus (Rebel & Zerny, 1931)
- Charissa ciscaucasica Rjabov, 1964
- Charissa corsica (Oberthür, 1913)
- Charissa crenulata (Staudinger, 1871)
- Charissa difficilis (Alphéraky, 1883)
- Charissa difficillimus Wiltshire, 1967
- Charissa dubitaria (Staudinger, 1892)
- Charissa effendii (Viidalepp & Pirijev, 1993)
- Charissa exilis Wehrli, 1922
- Charissa exsuctaria Püngeler, 1903
- Charissa glaciatus Wehrli, 1922
- Charissa glaucinaria (Hübner, [1799])
- Charissa hissariensis (Stshetkin & Viidalepp, 1980)
- Charissa intermedia (Wehrli, 1917)
- Charissa italohelveticus (Rezbanyai-Reser, 1986)
- Charissa longipes (Viidalepp, 1980)
- Charissa luticiliata Christoph, 1887
- Charissa maracandica (Viidalepp, 1992)
- Charissa mcguffini (Smiles, 1980)
- Charissa mucidaria (Hübner, 1799)
- Charissa mutilata (Staudinger, 1879)
- Charissa obscurata – annulet (Denis & Schiffermüller, 1775)
- Charissa onustaria (Herrich-Schäffer, [1852])
- Charissa pallescens (Rjabov, 1964)
- Charissa pentheri (Rebel, 1904)
- Charissa pollinaria Christoph, 1887
- Charissa praeacutaria (Wehrli, 1922)
- Charissa predotae (Schawerda, 1929)
- Charissa pullata (Denis & Schiffermüller, 1775)
- Charissa remmi (Viidalepp, 1988)
- Charissa rjabovi Wehrli, 1939
- Charissa sheljuzhkoi (Schawerda, 1924)
- Charissa sibiriata (Guenée, 1857)
- Charissa subsplendidaria Wehrli, 1922
- Charissa supinaria (Mann, 1854)
- Charissa symmicta Wehrli, 1953
- Charissa talvei (Viidalepp, 1980)
- Charissa talyshensis (Wehrli, 1936)
- Charissa turfosaria Wehrli, 1922
- Charissa urmensis Wehrli, 1953
- Charissa uzbekistanica (Viidalepp, 1988)
- Charissa variegata (Duponchel, 1830)
- Charissa zaprjagaevi (Viidalepp, 1980)
- Charissa zeitunaria (Staudinger, 1901)
- Charissa zejae Wehrli, 1953
