= Dyschoroneura =

Scientific classification
- Kingdom: Animalia
- Phylum: Arthropoda
- Class: Insecta
- Order: Lepidoptera
- Family: Geometridae
- Subfamily: Ennominae
- Genus: Dyschoroneura; Warren, 1894

Genus of moths

Dyschoroneura is a genus of moths in the family Geometridae.

== Species ==
- Dyschoroneura obsolescens Warren, 1894
