= Dizuga =

Scientific classification
- Kingdom: Animalia
- Phylum: Arthropoda
- Class: Insecta
- Order: Lepidoptera
- Family: Geometridae
- Subfamily: Sterrhinae
- Genus: Dizuga; Warren, 1896
- Species: D. recusataria

Binomial name
- Dizuga recusataria (Walker, [1863])

Genus of moths

Dizuga is a monotypic moth genus in the family Geometridae described by Warren in 1896. It is sometimes considered a synonym of Anisodes. Its only species, Dizuga recusataria, was first described by Francis Walker in 1863. It is found in Australia.
