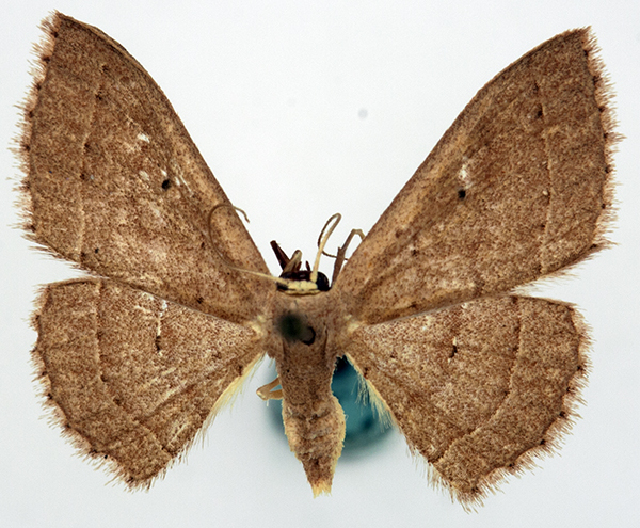

Scientific classification
- Domain: Eukaryota
- Kingdom: Animalia
- Phylum: Arthropoda
- Class: Insecta
- Order: Lepidoptera
- Family: Geometridae
- Genus: Dithecodes; Warren, 1900
- Species: D. erasa

Binomial name
- Dithecodes erasa Warren, 1900

= Dithecodes =

Genus of moths

Dithecodes is a genus in the family Geometridae. Its type species, Dithecodes erasa, is found in Japan. Both the genus and species were first described by Warren in 1900.

== Species ==
- Dithecodes erasa Warren, 1900 (Japan)
- Dithecodes brunneifrons (Hampson, 1909)
- Dithecodes delicata (Warren, 1899)
- Dithecodes ornithospila (Prout L. B., 1911)
- Dithecodes purpuraria Joannis, 1932
