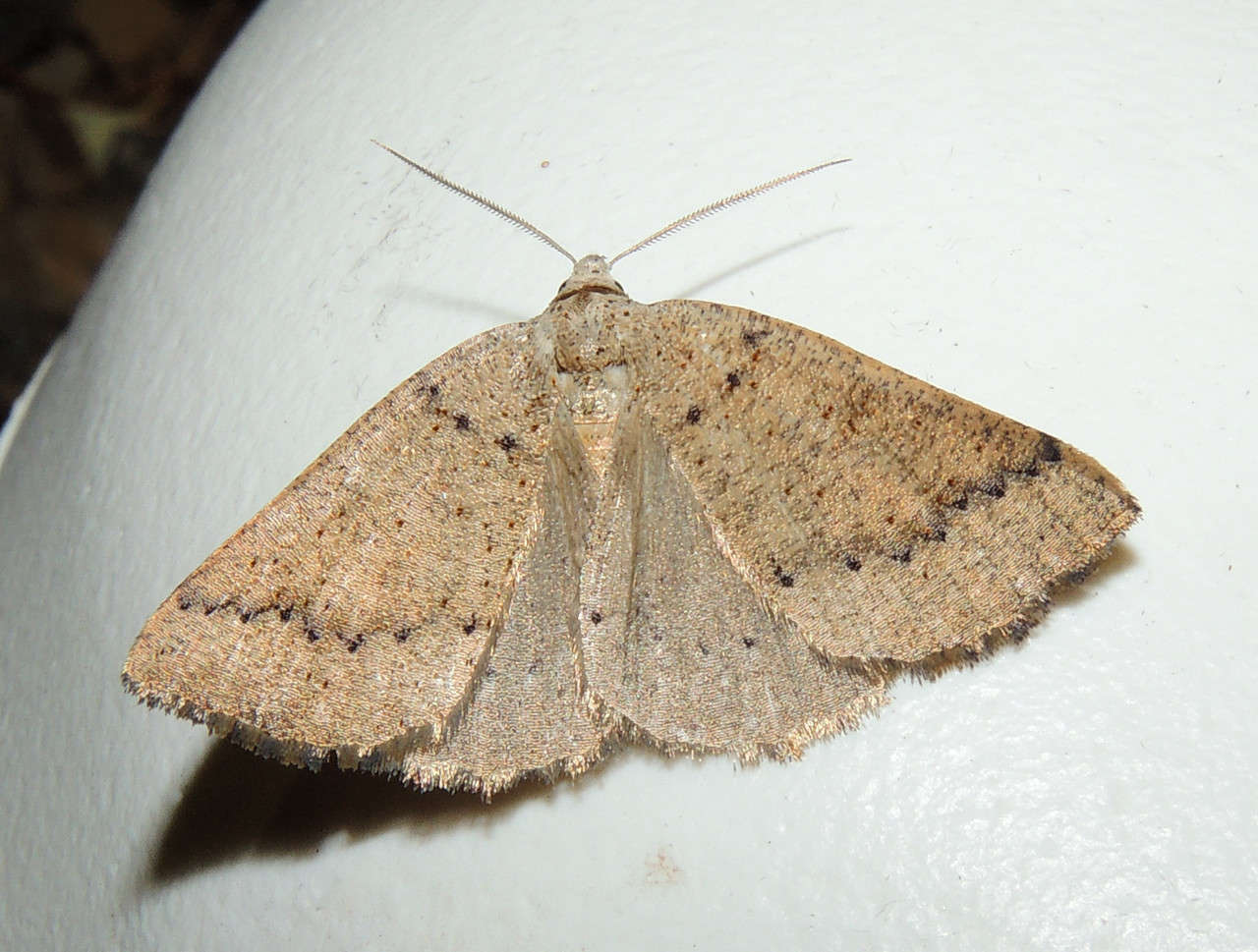
- Dolabrossa amblopa

Scientific classification
- Domain: Eukaryota
- Kingdom: Animalia
- Phylum: Arthropoda
- Class: Insecta
- Order: Lepidoptera
- Family: Geometridae
- Genus: Dolabrossa; McQuillan, 1996

= Dolabrossa =

Genus of moths

Dolabrossa is a genus of moths in the family Geometridae.
