= Diptychia =

Scientific classification
- Kingdom: Animalia
- Phylum: Arthropoda
- Class: Insecta
- Order: Lepidoptera
- Family: Geometridae
- Subfamily: Ennominae
- Genus: Diptychia; Mabille, 1898
- Species: D. rhodotenia

Binomial name
- Diptychia rhodotenia Mabille, 1898

Genus of moths

Diptychia is a monotypic moth genus in the family Geometridae. Its only species, Diptychia rhodotenia, is known from Madagascar. Both the genus and species were first described by Paul Mabille in 1898.
