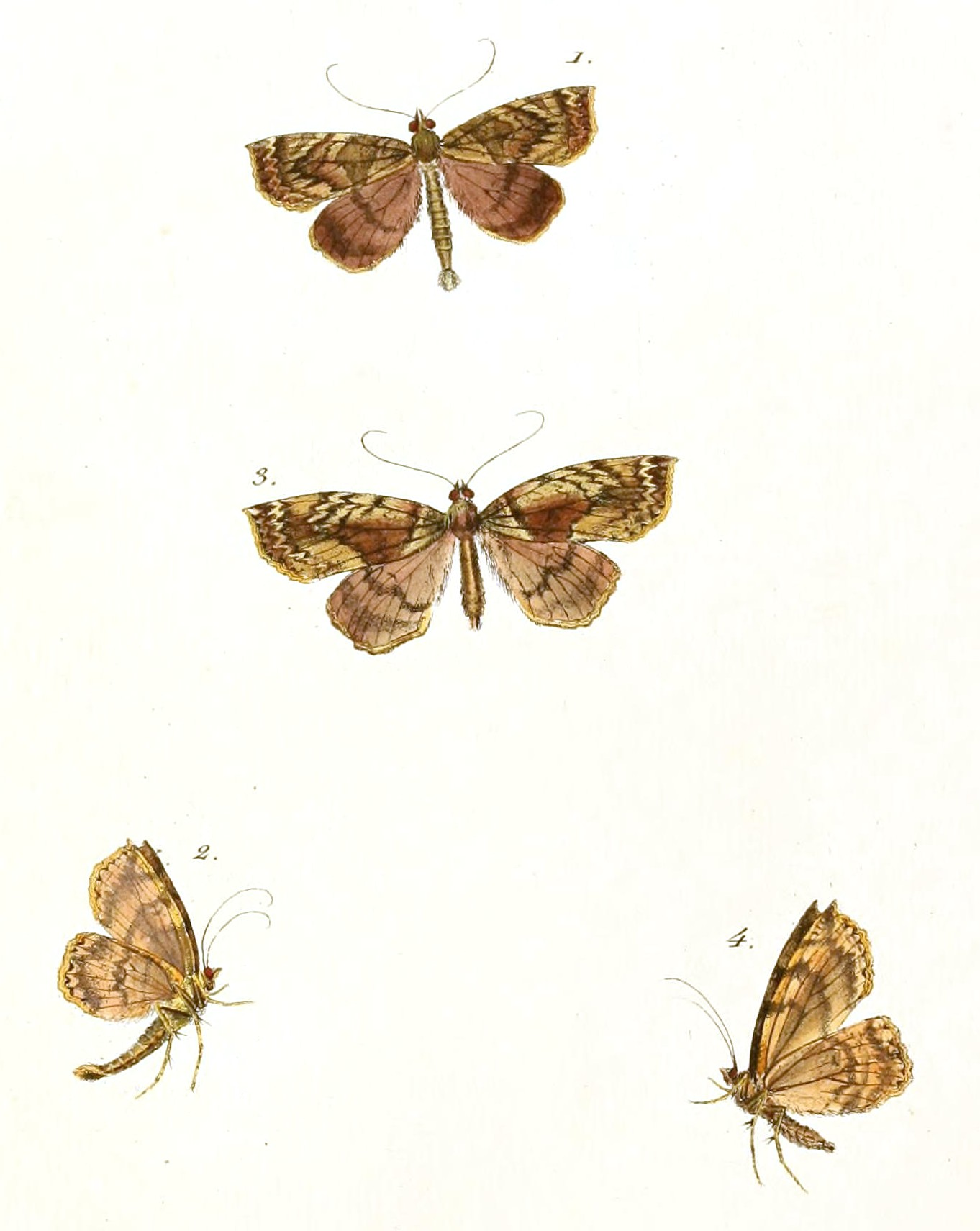
- Ischnopteris chlorata

Scientific classification
- Kingdom: Animalia
- Phylum: Arthropoda
- Clade: Pancrustacea
- Class: Insecta
- Order: Lepidoptera
- Family: Geometridae
- Genus: Ischnopteris; Hübner, [1823]

Synonyms
- Amblurodes Warren, 1900; Trichostichia Warren, 1895; Ischnopterix Hübner, [1825]; Ischnopteryx Agassiz, 1847; Syrtodes Guenée, [1858]

= Ischnopteris =

Genus of moths

Ischnopteris is a genus of moths in the family Geometridae described by Jacob Hübner in 1823.

== Species ==
- Ischnopteris obsoleta Rindge, 1983
- Ischnopteris pallidicosta Schaus
- Ischnopteris variegata Schaus
- Ischnopteris albiguttata Warren, 1904
- Ischnopteris aurudaria Schaus, 1901
- Ischnopteris beckeri Pitkin, 2005
- Ischnopteris bifinita Walker, 1862
- Ischnopteris bifurcata Pitkin, 2005
- Ischnopteris bipectinata Pitkin, 2005
- Ischnopteris brehmi Pitkin, 2005
- Ischnopteris bryifera Felder & Rogenhofer, 1875
- Ischnopteris catocalata Guenée, [1858]
- Ischnopteris chavesi Pitkin, 2005
- Ischnopteris chlorata Hübner, [1823]
- Ischnopteris chloroclystata Guenée, [1858]
- Ischnopteris chlorophaearia Walker, 1866
- Ischnopteris fabiana Stoll, 1782
- Ischnopteris fasciata Pitkin, 2005
- Ischnopteris fassli Pitkin, 2005
- Ischnopteris hirsuta Pitkin, 2005
- Ischnopteris hoffmani Pitkin, 2005
- Ischnopteris illineata Warren, 1909
- Ischnopteris inornata Pitkin, 2005
- Ischnopteris janzeni Pitkin, 2005
- Ischnopteris klagesi Pitkin, 2005
- Ischnopteris lata Pitkin, 2005
- Ischnopteris latijuxta Pitkin, 2005
- Ischnopteris lemoulti Pitkin, 2005
- Ischnopteris miseliata Guenée, [1858]
- Ischnopteris multistrigata Warren, 1909
- Ischnopteris obtortionis Prout, 1928
- Ischnopteris ochroprosthia Prout, 1929
- Ischnopteris palmeri Pitkin, 2005
- Ischnopteris pronubata Felder & Rogenhofer, 1875
- Ischnopteris rostellaria Felder & Rogenhofer, 1875
- Ischnopteris seriei Giacomelli, 1911
- Ischnopteris stenoptila Warren, 1907
- Ischnopteris watsoni Pitkin, 2005
- Ischnopteris xylinata Guenée, [1858]
