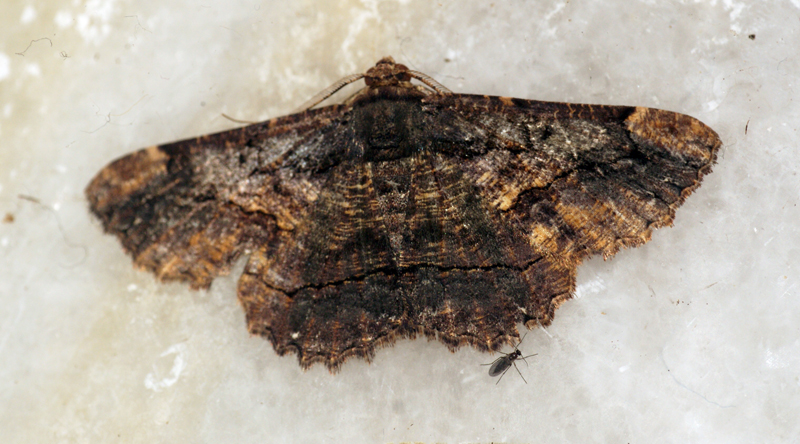
- Dasyboarmia sp. (cf. subpilosa)

Scientific classification
- Kingdom: Animalia
- Phylum: Arthropoda
- Clade: Pancrustacea
- Class: Insecta
- Order: Lepidoptera
- Family: Geometridae
- Subfamily: Ennominae
- Tribe: Boarmiini
- Genus: Dasyboarmia; Prout, 1928

= Dasyboarmia =

Genus of moths

Dasyboarmia is a genus of moths in the family Geometridae.

== Species ==
- Dasyboarmia delineata (Walker, 1860)
- Dasyboarmia hyperdasys Prout, 1928
- Dasyboarmia isorropha Prout, 1932
- Dasyboarmia owadai (Sato, 1987)
- Dasyboarmia pilosissima Holloway, 1993
- Dasyboarmia subpilosa (Warren, 1894)
