= Delocharis =

Scientific classification
- Kingdom: Animalia
- Phylum: Arthropoda
- Class: Insecta
- Order: Lepidoptera
- Family: Geometridae
- Subfamily: Sterrhinae
- Genus: Delocharis

Genus of moths

Delocharis is a genus of moths in the family Geometridae.

== Bibliography ==
- Pitkin, Brian & Jenkins, Paul. "Search results Family: Geometridae". Butterflies and Moths of the World. Natural History Museum, London.
