= Incudifera =

Scientific classification
- Kingdom: Animalia
- Phylum: Arthropoda
- Class: Insecta
- Order: Lepidoptera
- Family: Geometridae
- Genus: Incudifera; D. S. Fletcher, 1979

Genus of moths

Incudifera is a genus of moths in the family Geometridae erected by David Stephen Fletcher in 1979.
