= Derrioides =

Scientific classification
- Kingdom: Animalia
- Phylum: Arthropoda
- Class: Insecta
- Order: Lepidoptera
- Family: Geometridae
- Subfamily: Ennominae
- Genus: Derrioides

Genus of moths

Derrioides is a genus of moths in the family Geometridae. The genus Derrioides was originally a part of the family Notodontidae, but was moved into the family Geometridae where it is today.
