= Desertobia =

Scientific classification
- Kingdom: Animalia
- Phylum: Arthropoda
- Clade: Pancrustacea
- Class: Insecta
- Order: Lepidoptera
- Family: Geometridae
- Subfamily: Ennominae
- Genus: Desertobia; Viidalepp, 1989

Genus of moths

Desertobia is a genus of moths in the family Geometridae.

== Species ==
- Desertobia nocturna Viidalepp, 1989
