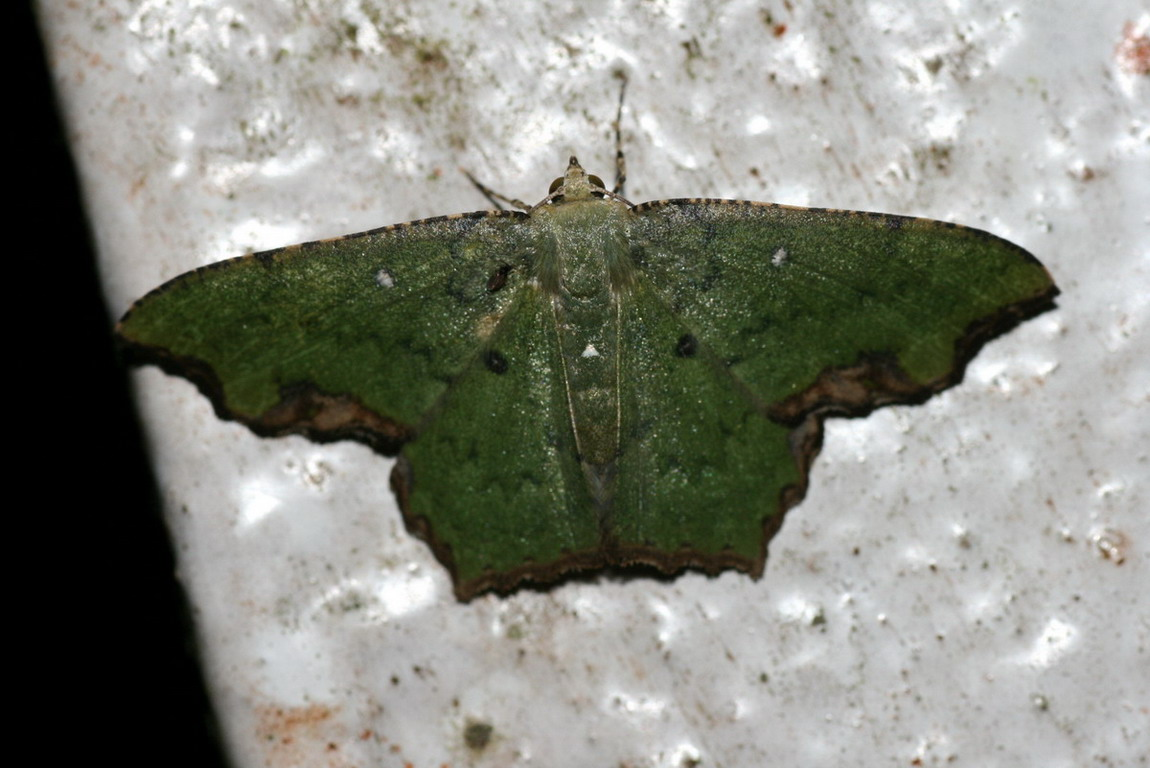
- Dooabia puncticostata

Scientific classification
- Kingdom: Animalia
- Phylum: Arthropoda
- Class: Insecta
- Order: Lepidoptera
- Family: Geometridae
- Subfamily: Geometrinae
- Genus: Dooabia; Warren, 1894

= Dooabia =

Genus of moths

Dooabia is a genus of moths in the family Geometridae. The genus was described by Warren in 1894.

== Species ==
- Dooabia ambigua Yazaki
- Dooabia bruneiconcha Holloway, 1996
- Dooabia lunifera (Moore, 1888)
- Dooabia myopa L. B. Prout
- Dooabia owadai Yazaki
- Dooabia plana L. B. Prout, 1916
- Dooabia puncticostata L. B. Prout, 1923
- Dooabia viridata (Moore)
