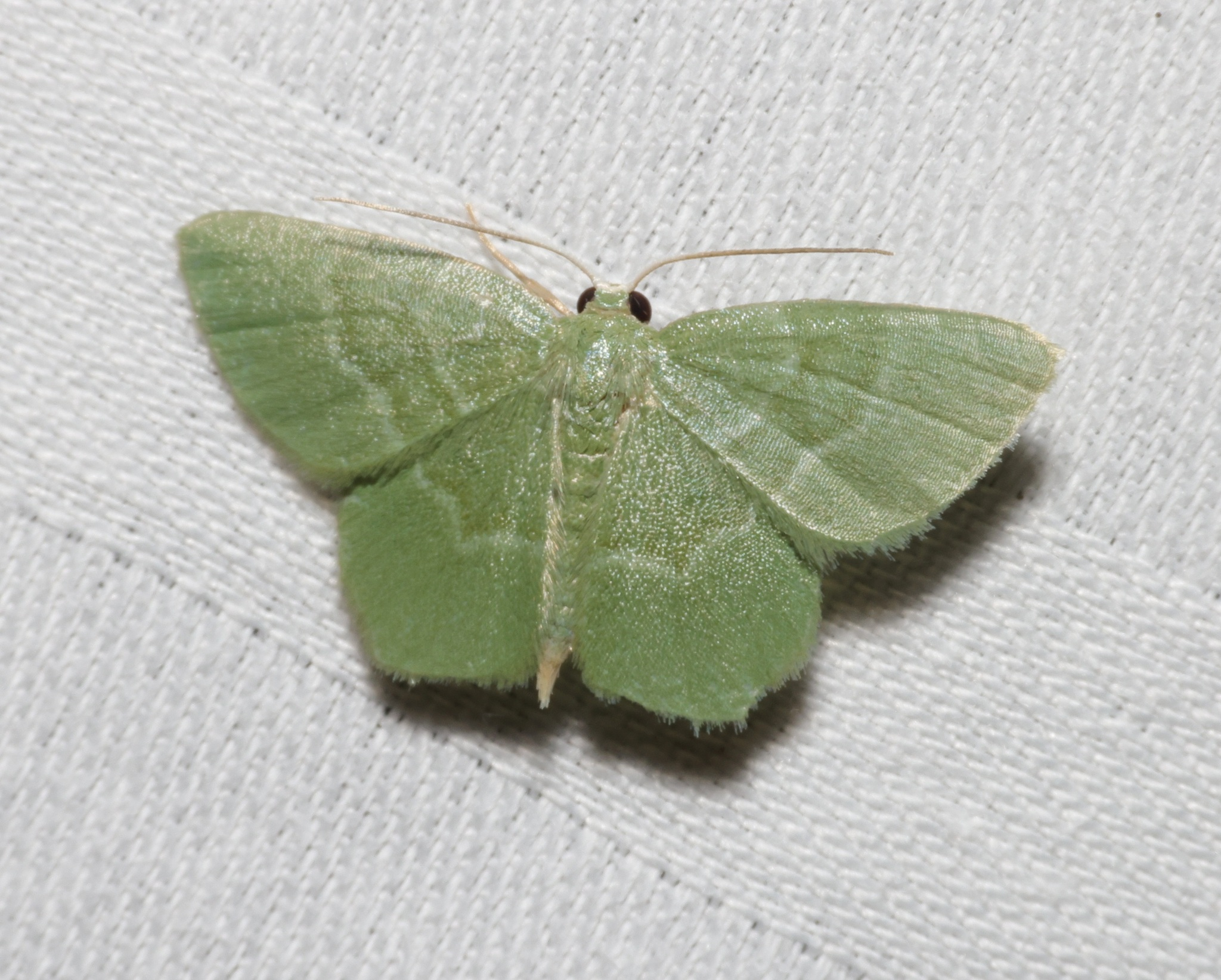
- Moth species in the genus Idiochlora

Scientific classification
- Kingdom: Animalia
- Phylum: Arthropoda
- Class: Insecta
- Order: Lepidoptera
- Family: Geometridae
- Subfamily: Geometrinae
- Tribe: Hemitheini
- Genus: Idiochlora; Warren, 1896

Synonyms
- Acrortha Warren, 1896; Diplodesma Warren, 1896; Halophanes Warren, 1900

= Idiochlora =

Genus of moths

Idiochlora is a genus of moths in the family Geometridae. The genus was described by Warren in 1896.

== Species ==
- Idiochlora flexicosta Warren Sri Lanka
- Idiochlora ussuriana (Bremer, 1864) south-eastern Siberia, Japan
- Idiochlora xanthochlora Swinhoe northern India
- Idiochlora pudentifimbria (Prout, 1912) north-eastern Himalayas, Peninsular Malaysia, Borneo
- Idiochlora mundaria Leech China
- Idiochlora planata Prout Himalayas
- Idiochlora celataria (Walker, 1866) Sulawesi, Borneo, ?Sumatra, Peninsular Malaysia, Seram, Kei, New Guinea, Queensland
- Idiochlora caudularia Guenée Sri Lanka, southern India
- Idiochlora contracta Warren north-eastern Himalayas
- Idiochlora androcmes Prout Bali
- Idiochlora subtusumbrata Fuchs
- Idiochlora subexpressa (Walker, 1861) Borneo, ?Peninsular Malaysia
- Idiochlora innotata (Walker, 1861) Borneo, Sumatra
- Idiochlora olivata (Warren, 1897) Borneo, Peninsular Malaysia (Penang)
- Idiochlora berwicki (Holloway, 1976) Borneo
- Idiochlora stictogramma (Prout, 1932) Borneo
- Idiochlora stictogrammoides Holloway, 1996 Borneo
