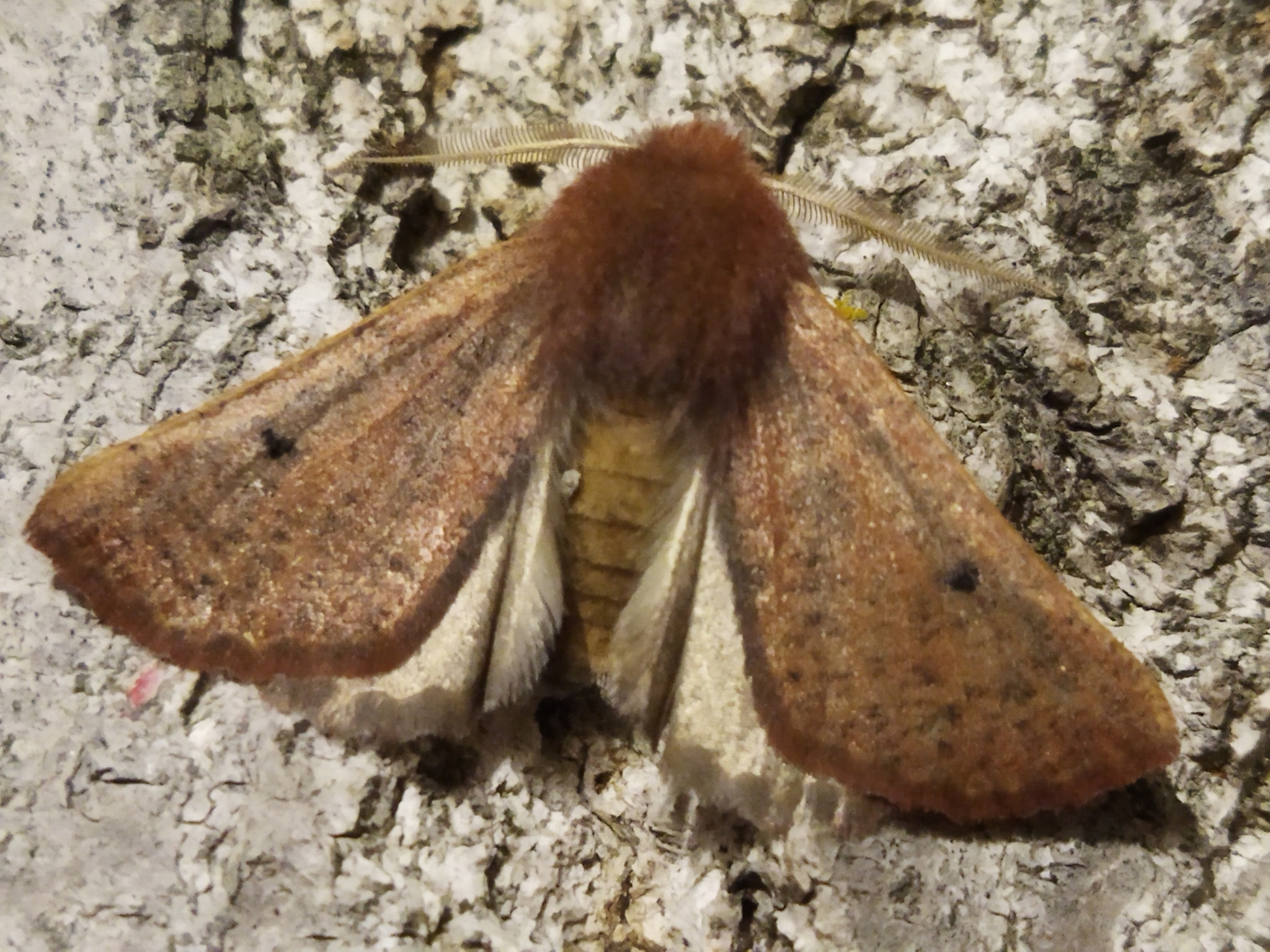

Scientific classification
- Kingdom: Animalia
- Phylum: Arthropoda
- Clade: Pancrustacea
- Class: Insecta
- Order: Lepidoptera
- Family: Geometridae
- Subfamily: Ennominae
- Genus: Dasycorsa; Prout, 1915
- Species: D. modesta

Binomial name
- Dasycorsa modesta (Staudinger, 1879)

Synonyms
- List (Genus): Dasycephala Staudinger, 1879; (Species): Dasycephala modesta Staudinger, 1879; Dasycorsa astigmatica Wiltshire, 1939; Dasycorsa rubrior Wagner

= Dasycorsa =

Genus of moths

Dasycorsa is a genus of moths in the family Geometridae. It is monotypic, being represented by the single species Dasycorsa modesta which has been recorded in the Balkans and the Middle East.
