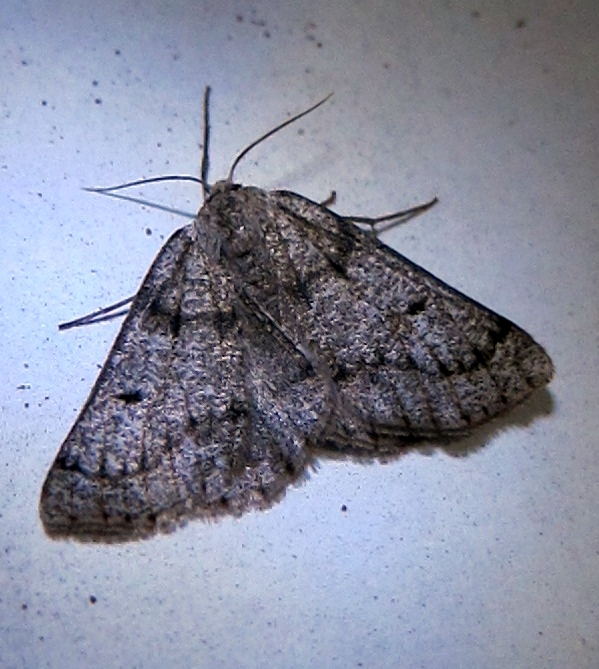
- Dyscia fagaria

Scientific classification
- Kingdom: Animalia
- Phylum: Arthropoda
- Clade: Pancrustacea
- Class: Insecta
- Order: Lepidoptera
- Family: Geometridae
- Tribe: Aspitatini
- Genus: Dyscia; Hübner, 1825

Synonyms
- Calodyscia Wehrli, 1950; Catadyscia Wehrli, 1950; Eudyscia Wehrli, 1950; Iberafrina Wehrli, 1950; Rjabovana Wehrli, 1950; Psednothrix Hübner, 1825; Warneckeella Wehrli, 1950; Zuleika Bang-Haas, 1906

= Dyscia =

Genus of moths

Dyscia is a genus of moths in the family Geometridae erected by Jacob Hübner in 1825.

== Species ==
- Dyscia atlantica Reisser, 1933
- Dyscia conspersaria (Denis & Schiffermüller, 1775)
- Dyscia crassipunctaria (Rebel, 1916)
- Dyscia distinctaria (Bang-Haas, 1910)
- Dyscia dodonaeeti Wiltshire, 1986
- Dyscia fagaria (Thunberg, 1784) – grey scalloped bar
- Dyscia galactaria Turati, 1934
- Dyscia holli (Oberthür, 1910)
- Dyscia innocentaria (Christoph, 1885)
- Dyscia lentiscaria (Donzel, 1837)
- Dyscia leucogrammaria (Püngeler, 1900)
- Dyscia malatyana Wehrli, 1934
- Dyscia negrama Wehrli, 1953
- Dyscia nobiliaria (A. Bang-Haas, 1906)
- Dyscia penulataria (Hübner, 1819)
- Dyscia plebejaria (Oberthür, 1910)
- Dyscia raunaria (Freyer, 1851)
- Dyscia royaria Tautel & Billi, 2006
- Dyscia rungsi Herbulot, 1981
- Dyscia simplicaria Rebel, 1933
