= Protuliocnemis =

Scientific classification
- Kingdom: Animalia
- Phylum: Arthropoda
- Clade: Pancrustacea
- Class: Insecta
- Order: Lepidoptera
- Family: Geometridae
- Subfamily: Geometrinae
- Genus: Protuliocnemis; Holloway, 1996

Genus of moths

Protuliocnemis is a genus of moths in the family Geometridae erected by Jeremy Daniel Holloway in 1996.

== Species ==
Species include:

- Protuliocnemis biplagiata (Moore, [1887]) Sri Lanka, southern India, Sundaland, New Caledonia, New Guinea, Australia
- Protuliocnemis castalaria (Oberthür, 1916)
- Protuliocnemis helpsi Holloway, 1996 Borneo, Singapore
- Protuliocnemis partita (Walker, 1861) India - Indochina, Sundaland, New Guinea, Queensland
- Protuliocnemis woodfordi (Warren) Vanuatu

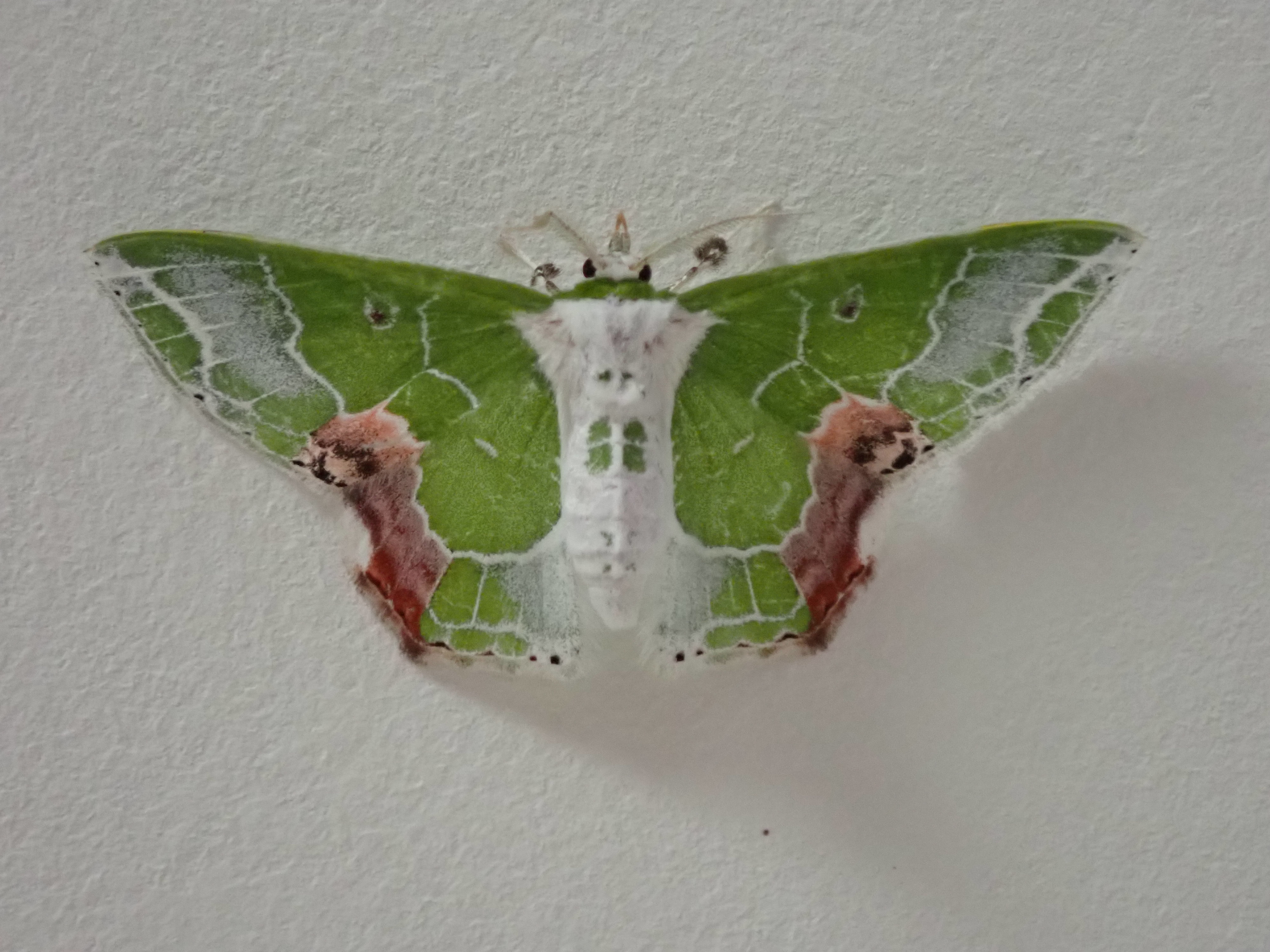
