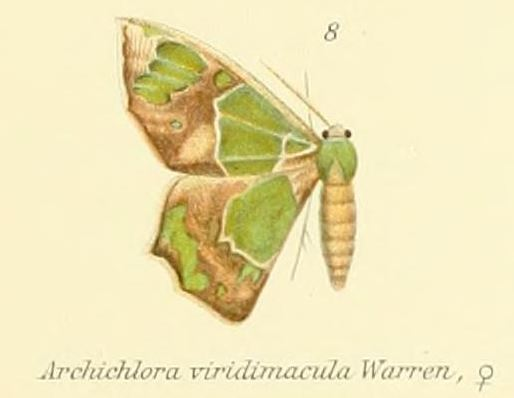

Scientific classification
- Kingdom: Animalia
- Phylum: Arthropoda
- Class: Insecta
- Order: Lepidoptera
- Family: Geometridae
- Subfamily: Geometrinae
- Genus: Archichlora; Warren, 1898

Synonyms
- Chloroteras Warren, 1901

= Archichlora =

Genus of moths

Archichlora is a genus of moths in the family Geometridae described by Warren in 1898.

== Species ==
The African species of this genus are:

- Archichlora alophias Herbulot, 1954
- Archichlora altivagans Herbulot, 1960
- Archichlora ambrimontis Herbulot, 1960
- Archichlora andranobe Viette, 1978
- Archichlora ankalirano Viette, 1975
- Archichlora ansorgei (Warren, 1901)
- Archichlora antanosa Herbulot, 1960
- Archichlora bevilany Viette, 1978
- Archichlora chariessa Prout, 1925
- Archichlora devoluta (Walker, 1861)
- Archichlora engenes Prout, 1922
- Archichlora epicydra Prout, 1938
- Archichlora florilimbata Herbulot, 1960
- Archichlora griveaudi Viette, 1978
- Archichlora hemistrigata (Mabille, 1900)
- Archichlora herbuloti Viette, 1978
- Archichlora ioannis Herbulot, 1954
- Archichlora jacksoni Carcasson, 1971
- Archichlora majuscula Herbulot, 1960
- Archichlora marcescens Warren, 1904
- Archichlora marginata (Warren, 1902)
- Archichlora monodi Viette, 1975
- Archichlora nigricosta Herbulot, 1960
- Archichlora pavonina Herbulot, 1960
- Archichlora petroselina Herbulot, 1960
- Archichlora phyllobrota (Holland, 1920)
- Archichlora povolnyi Viette, 1975
- Archichlora pulveriplaga (Warren, 1898)
- Archichlora rectilineata Carcasson, 1971
- Archichlora sangoana Carcasson, 1971
- Archichlora soa Viette, 1971
- Archichlora sola Herbulot, 1960
- Archichlora stellicincta Herbulot, 1972
- Archichlora subrubescens Herbulot, 1960
- Archichlora triangularia (C. Swinhoe, 1904)
- Archichlora tricycla Herbulot, 1960
- Archichlora trygodes Prout, 1922
- Archichlora vieui Herbulot, 1960
- Archichlora viridicrossa Herbulot, 1960
- Archichlora viridimacula Warren, 1898 - type species
