= Cyclothea =

Scientific classification
- Kingdom: Animalia
- Phylum: Arthropoda
- Clade: Pancrustacea
- Class: Insecta
- Order: Lepidoptera
- Family: Geometridae
- Subfamily: Geometrinae
- Genus: Cyclothea; Prout, 1912

Genus of moths

Cyclothea is a genus of moths in the family Geometridae described by Prout in 1912.

== Species ==
- Cyclothea catathymia Prout, 1938
- Cyclothea disjuncta Walker, 1861
- Cyclothea exaereta West, 1930
