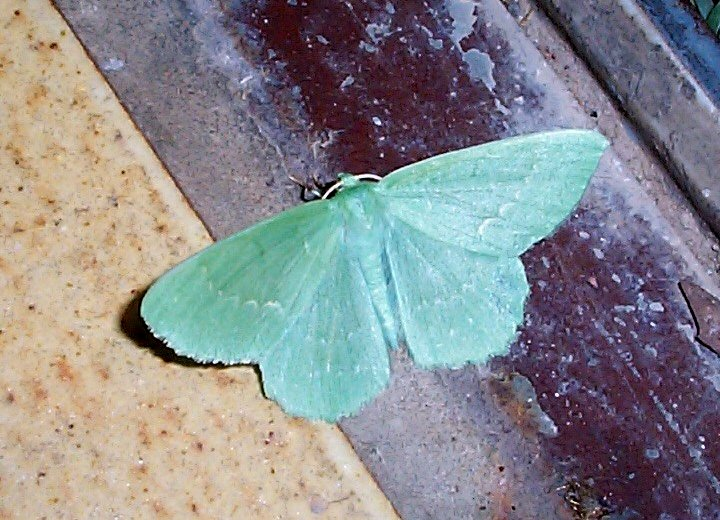

Scientific classification
- Kingdom: Animalia
- Phylum: Arthropoda
- Class: Insecta
- Order: Lepidoptera
- Family: Geometridae
- Genus: Geometra
- Species: G. papilionaria

Binomial name
- Geometra papilionaria (Linnaeus, 1758)

= Large emerald =

Species of moth

The large emerald (Geometra papilionaria) is a moth which is the type species for the family Geometridae. It is found throughout the Palearctic region and the Near East in and around deciduous forests, heathlands, marshland and in settlements close to woodland. The species was first described by Carl Linnaeus in his 1758 10th edition of Systema Naturae.

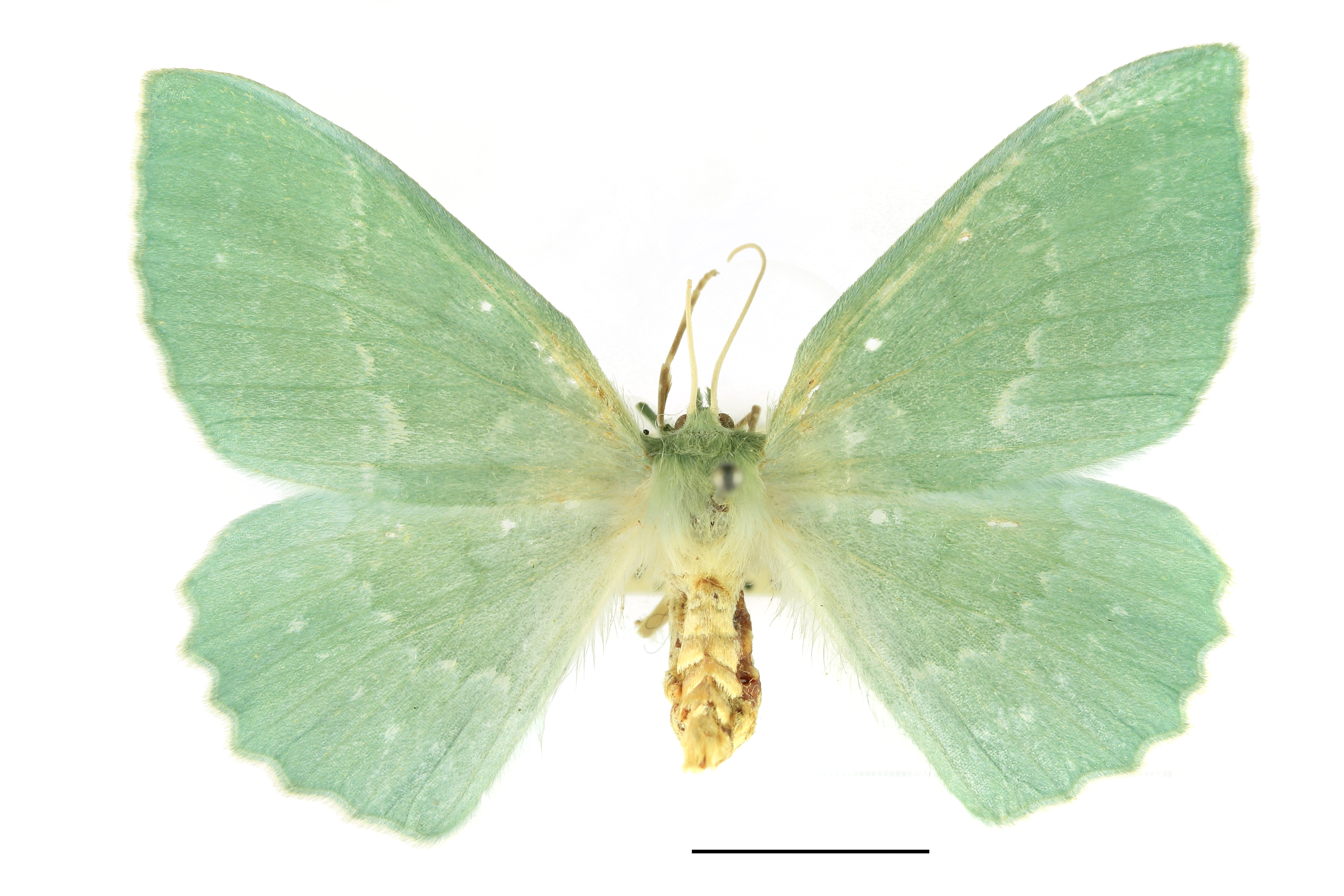
Museum specimen, collections SLU, Uppsala

== Description ==
This is a large and attractive moth, which, as the specific name suggests, is very butterfly like. It has a wingspan of 50–65 mm. Newly emerged adults are distinctive pale green with slightly darker green and, especially, white fascia, though the green colouration fades after a few days. The characteristic white fascia take the form of three jagged, broken lines of white spots on the forewings, of which two semicircular rows continue over the hindwings.

== Technical description and egg, larva and pupa ==
Bright green, the forewing usually with two lunulate-dentate white lines, the hindwing with one, the lunules in the submedian area of forewing the thickest; both wings usually in addition with a faintly darker green cell-mark and some indistinct white intraneural spots distally to the postmedian line. Under surface similarly but more weakly marked, with no antemedian line.- ab. herbacearia Men. is a form in which both the lines are obsolete. It was originally described, from Amurland, and as a separate species - ab. cuneata Burr, is characterized by a large wedge-shaped white spot adjoining the discal mark proximally in addition to the usual markings.-ab. subcaerulescens Burr, is of a bluer green ground-colour than the normal, but is probably scarcely worth naming.- ab. deleta Burr, is another unimportant aberration, in which the distal series of white spots is entirely obsolete - in ab. subobsoleta Burr. the antemedian line of the fore-wing is likewise obsolete. — ab. alba Gillm. is entirely white, above and beneath., slightly tinged with yellowish. The egg of is approximately oval, broader at one end and here flattened; it is strong and heavy looking, the surface sculptured, with strongly marked cells, the micropyle shown by a shallow, circular rayed pit. The larva feeds on birch and alder, and has been closely studied for its beautiful protective adaptations. It is rather stout, rugose, the surface shagreened, the head slightly notched, the setae mostly with enlarged summits. The larva hibernates small, and is at this time brown in colour, protectively assimilated to the tiny twigs. In the spring many become green, and they are wonderfully like the birch catkins among which they feed, various small protuberances and projecting edges of segments enhancing the resemblance. The pupa is cylindrical, tapering regularly from the fourth abdominal segment to the anal extremity; spiracles and tubercles distinct, the latter dark-coloured, bearing short curved setae; anal armature consisting of 8 hooks; the general colour is pale green, the wing-cases tinged with brown.

== Similar species ==
Hemistola chrysoprasaria, Thetidia smaragdaria, Campaea margaritata, Comibaena bajularia, Hemithea aestivaria and Hylaea fasciaria All lack the white, interrupted, jagged spot line on the wings.

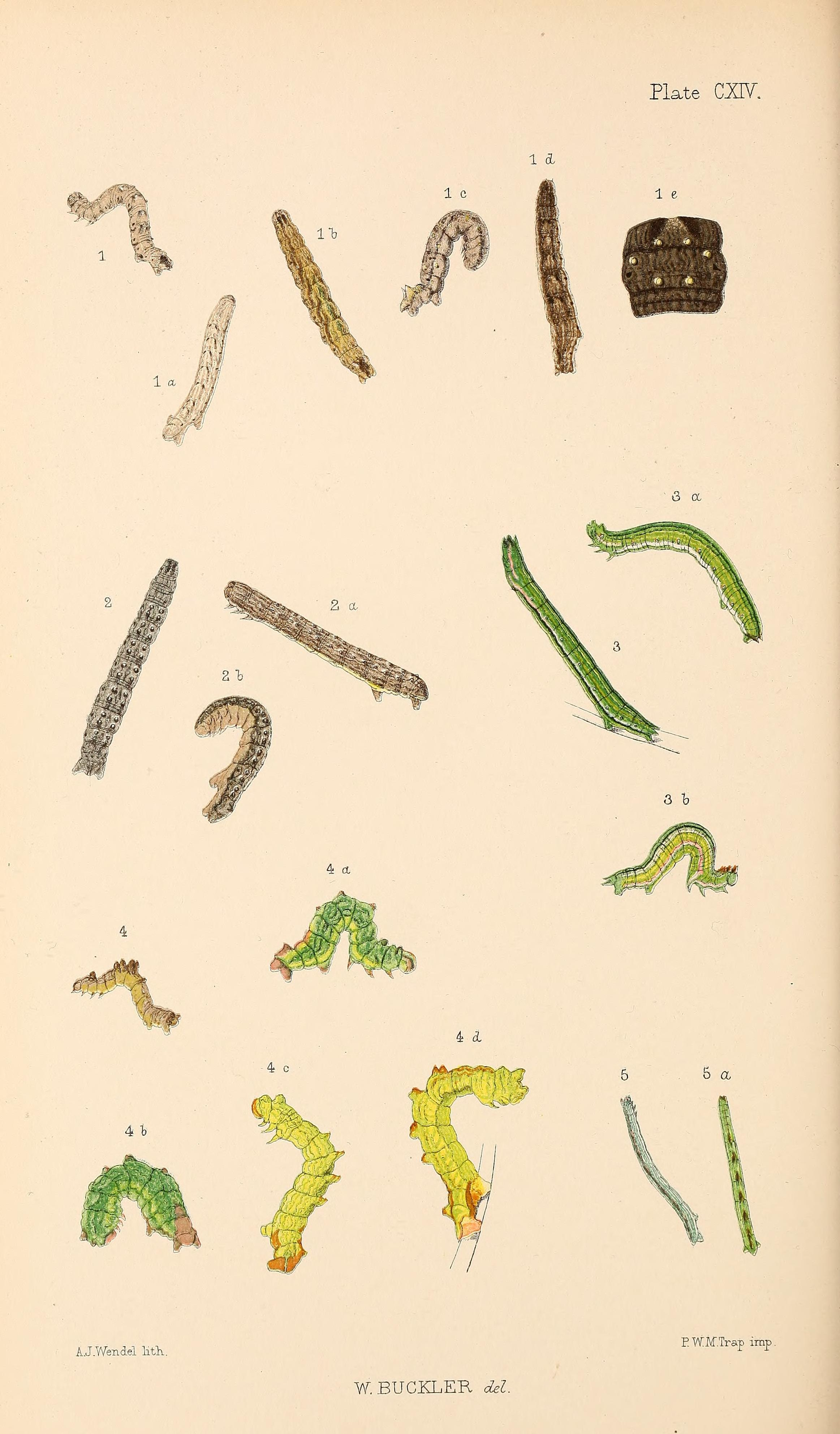
Figs4,4a,4b,4c,4d Larvae in various stages of growth

== Biology ==
It flies at night from June to August and is attracted to light. The hibernating larva is a reddish brown colour matching dead leaves. It turns green after hibernation to match spring leaves. It feeds mainly on birch though it has also been recorded on alder, beech, hazel and rowan. The chrysalis, enclosed in a flimsy silken web among the dead leaves, usually on the ground, is of a delicate green colour, dotted with buff on the back, and shaded with buff on the wing cases.

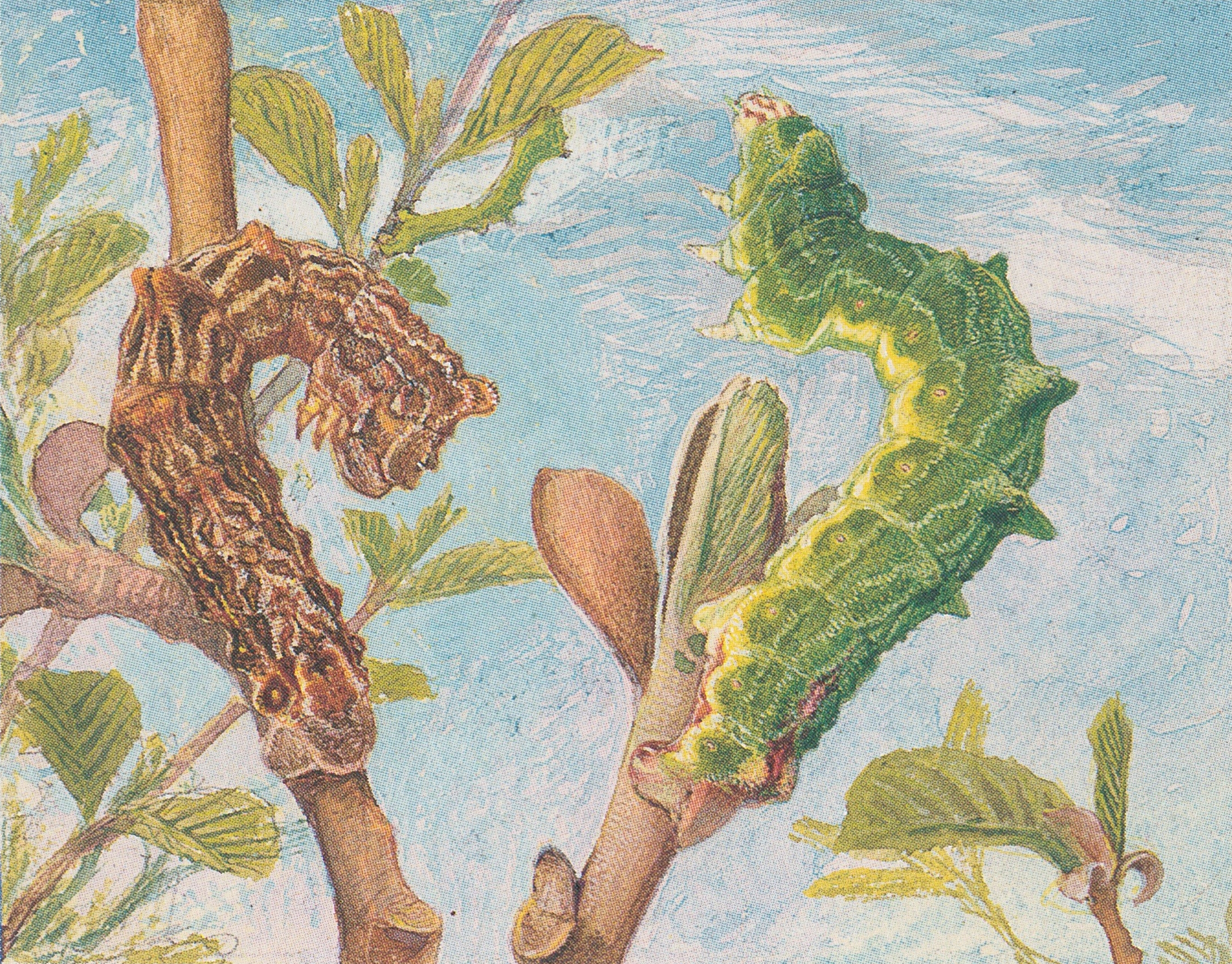
Caterpillar before (left) and after sprouting (right)

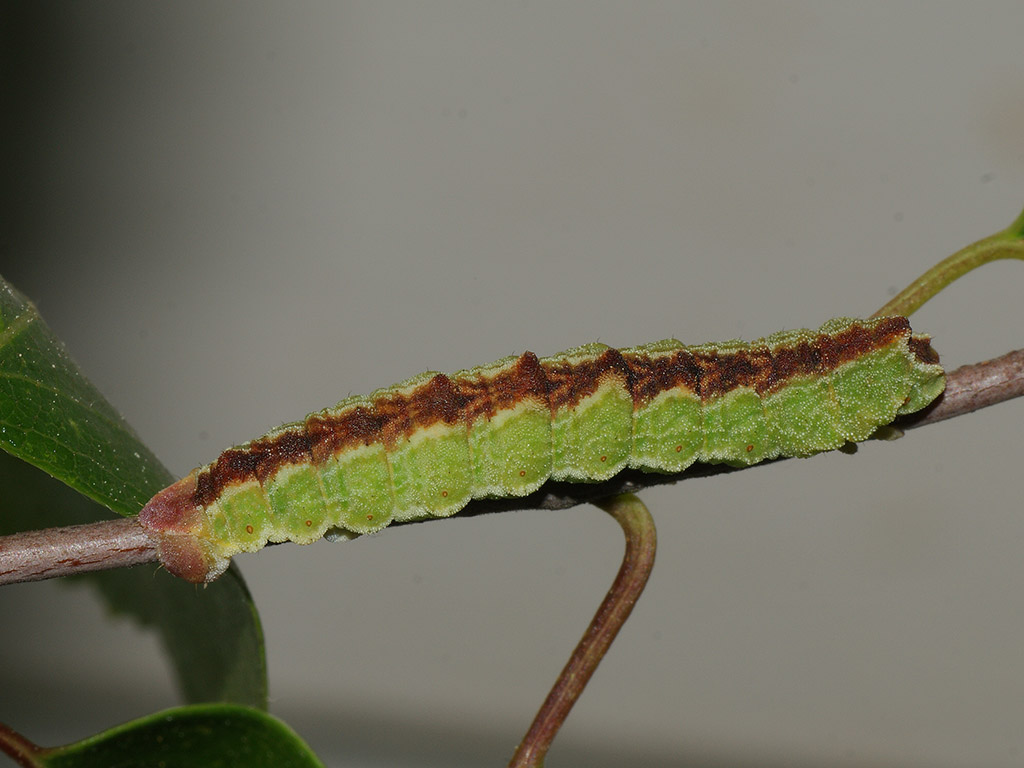
Caterpillar

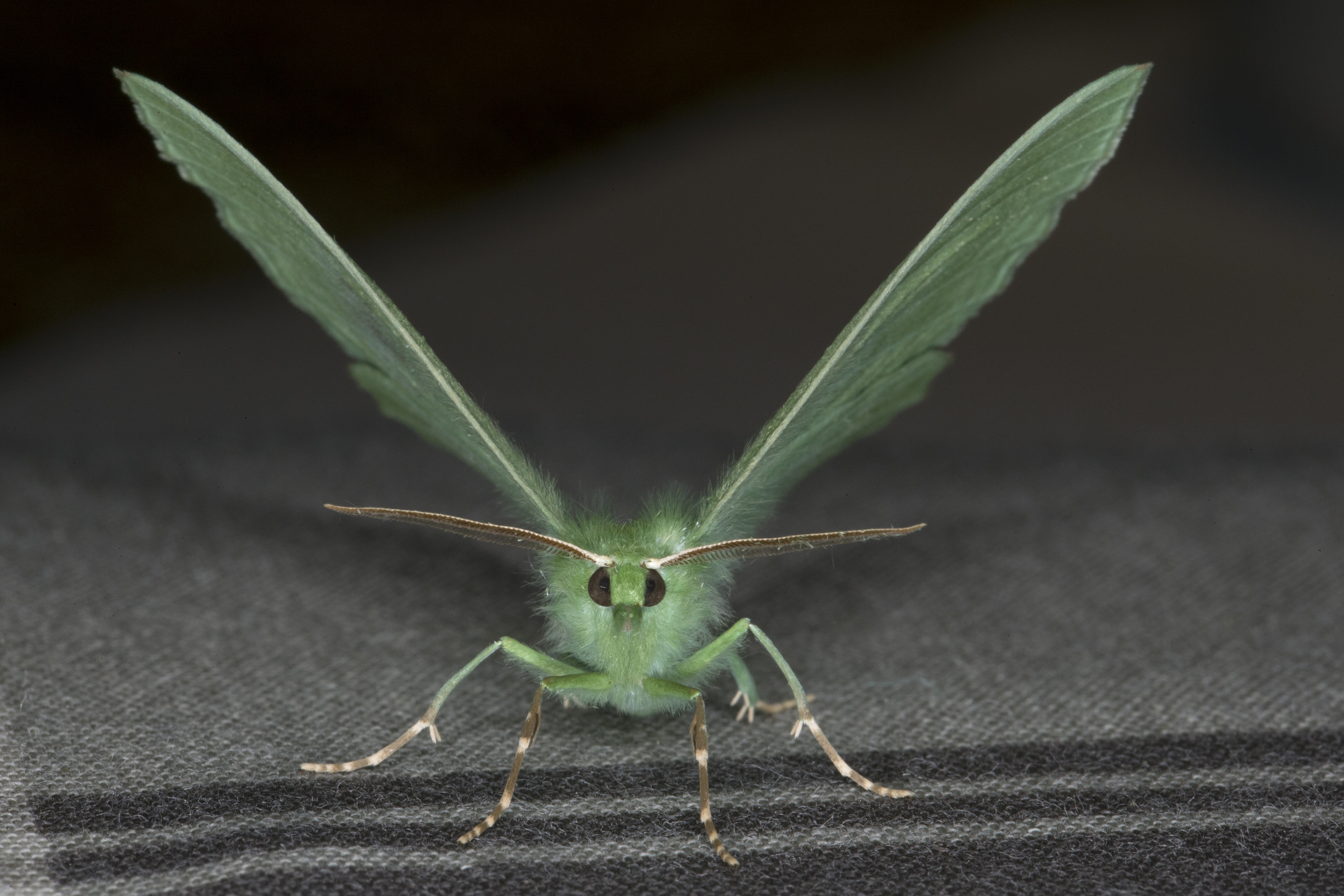
Front view of the moth

== Subspecies ==
- G. p. papilionaria Europe to the Urals, Southwest Siberia, Turkey, Caucasus, Transcaucasus
- G. p. herbacearia Ménétries, 1859 West Siberia - Southeast Siberia, Korea
- G. p. subrigua (Proute, 1935) Japan
