= Hylaea =

Hylaea may refer to any of these subjects:

- Hylaea (geography), a country visited by Heracles where he found the monster Echidna
- Hylaea (literature), a Ukrainian Futurist literary group
- Hylaea (moth), a genus of moths in the family Geometridae
- Hylaea (plant), a genus of plants in the subfamily Apocynoideae
