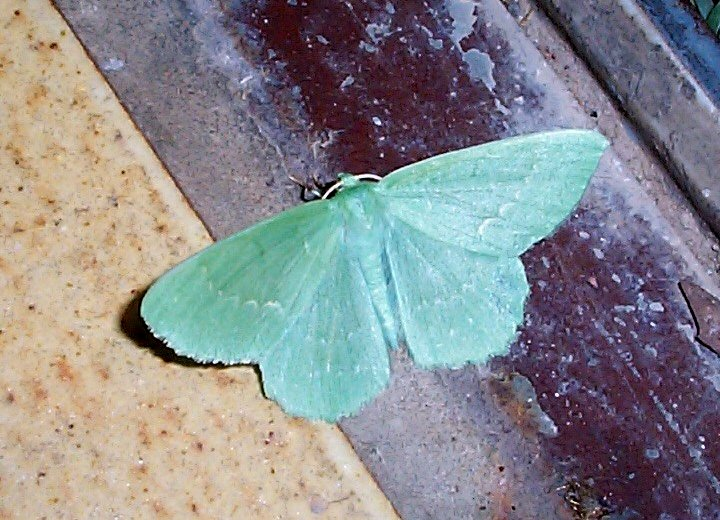
- Geometra papilionaria

Scientific classification
- Kingdom: Animalia
- Phylum: Arthropoda
- Clade: Pancrustacea
- Class: Insecta
- Order: Lepidoptera
- Family: Geometridae
- Subfamily: Geometrinae
- Genus: Geometra

Species
- see text

= Geometra =

Genus of moths

Geometra is a genus of moths in the family Geometridae.

== Species ==
- Geometra albovenaria Bremer, 1864
- Geometra burmensis Han, Galsworthy & Xue, 2009
- Geometra dieckmanni Graeser, 1889
- Geometra euryagyia (Prout, 1922)
- Geometra flavifrontaria (Guenée, [1858])
- Geometra fragilis (Oberthür, 1916)
- Geometra glaucaria Menetries, 1859
- Geometra monocerata Yazaki, 2020
- Geometra neovalida Han, Galsworthy & Xue, 2009
- Geometra papilionaria (Linnaeus, 1758)
- Geometra purissima Wiltshire, 1966
- Geometra rana (Oberthür, 1916)
- Geometra sigaria (Oberthür, 1916)
- Geometra sinoisaria Oberthür, 1916
- Geometra smaragdus (Butler, 1880)
- Geometra sponsaria (Bremer, 1864)
- Geometra symaria Oberthür, 1916
- Geometra ussuriensis (Sauber, 1915)
- Geometra valida Felder & Rogenhofer, 1875
