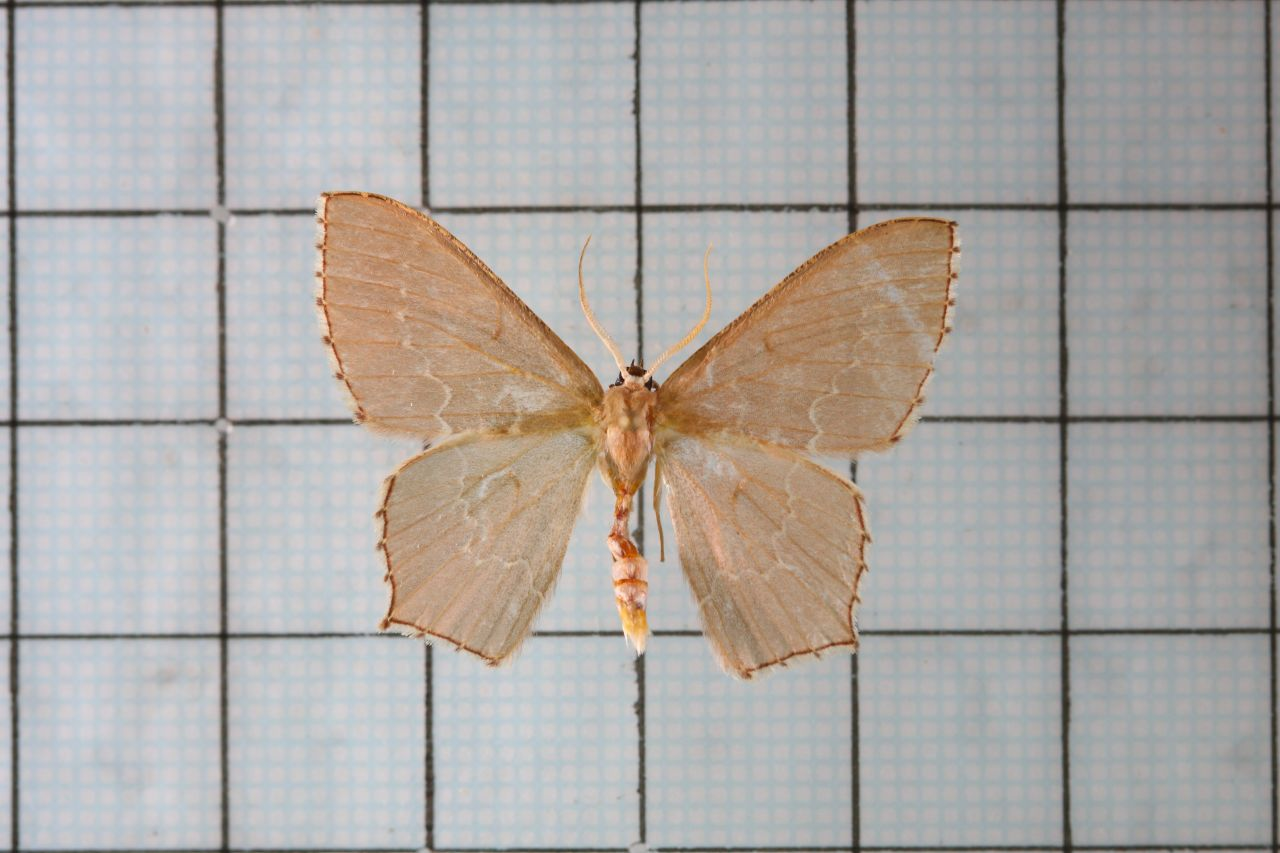

Scientific classification
- Kingdom: Animalia
- Phylum: Arthropoda
- Class: Insecta
- Order: Lepidoptera
- Family: Geometridae
- Genus: Hemistola
- Species: H. kezukai

Binomial name
- Hemistola kezukai Inoue, 1978

= Hemistola kezukai =

Species of moth

Hemistola kezukai is a species of moth in the family Geometridae. It is found in Taiwan.
