= Archichlora alophias =

Scientific classification
- Kingdom: Animalia
- Phylum: Arthropoda
- Class: Insecta
- Order: Lepidoptera
- Family: Geometridae
- Genus: Archichlora
- Species: A. alophias

Binomial name
- Archichlora alophias Herbulot, 1954

Species of moth

Archichlora alophias is a species of moth of the family Geometridae. It is found in central Madagascar, often near Antananarivo.

== Description ==
The male of this species has a forewing length of 11.5-12.5 mm. Its antennae are bipectinated. The vertex, the first segment of the thorax and the upper side of the thorax are green; the underside of the other segments of the thorax are clear brown. The upper side of the forewings is green with 4 hyaline spots and a black spot; the borders are reddish.

== Subspecies ==
- Archichlora alophias alophias Herbulot, 1954
- Archichlora alophias catalai Herbulot, 1954
