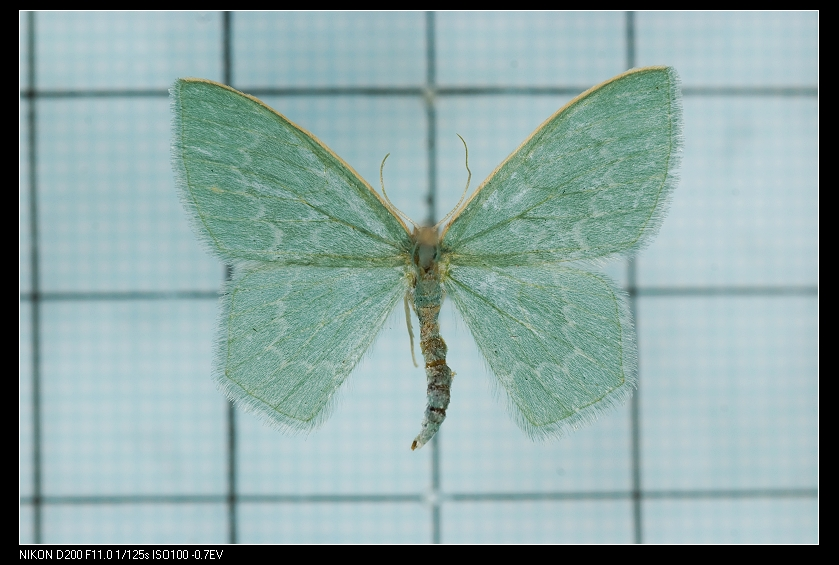

Scientific classification
- Kingdom: Animalia
- Phylum: Arthropoda
- Class: Insecta
- Order: Lepidoptera
- Family: Geometridae
- Genus: Hemistola
- Species: H. simplex

Binomial name
- Hemistola simplex Warren, 1899

Synonyms
- Hemistola fulvimargo Inoue, 1978

= Hemistola simplex =

Species of moth

Hemistola simplex is a moth belonging to the family Geometridae. It is endemic to Taiwan.
