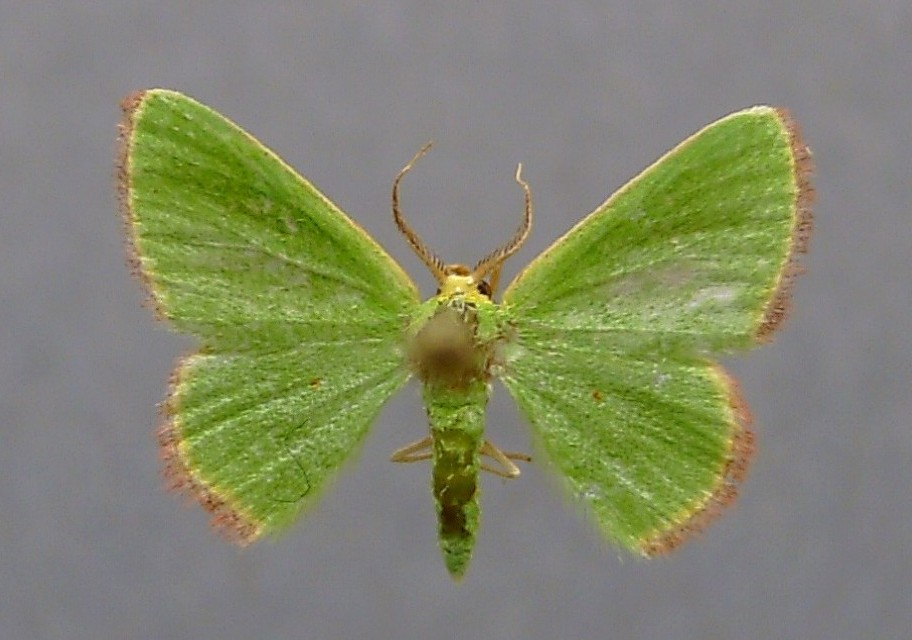
- Male

Scientific classification
- Kingdom: Animalia
- Phylum: Arthropoda
- Class: Insecta
- Order: Lepidoptera
- Family: Geometridae
- Genus: Eucrostes
- Species: E. indigenata

Binomial name
- Eucrostes indigenata (de Villers, 1789)

Synonyms
- Phalaena indigenata de Villers, 1789; Geometra fimbriolaria Hübner, [1817]; Fidonia indigenaria Treitschke, 1827; Eucrostis nudilimbaria Mabille, 1880; Phalaena virginalis Costa, [1841]; Eucrostes pulchra Mariani, 1937

= Eucrostes indigenata =

Species of moth

Eucrostes indigenata is a moth of the family Geometridae first described by Charles Joseph Devillers in 1789. It is found in the Mediterranean region, inland up to North Macedonia and Hungary. Subspecies lanjeronica is found in southern Spain and Algeria.

The wingspan is 14–16 mm for males and 18–20 mm for females. There are two to three generations per year. Adults are on wing from April to October. On Malta, adults have been recorded up to the beginning of November.

The larvae feed on Euphorbia species, including E. spinosa, E. pinea, E. cyparissias, E. virgata and E. platyphyllos. The species overwinters in the larval stage.

== Subspecies ==
- Eucrostes indigenata indigenata
- Eucrostes indigenata lanjeronica Hausmann, 1996 (Spain, Algeria)
