= Xenochlorodes =

Scientific classification
- Kingdom: Animalia
- Phylum: Arthropoda
- Class: Insecta
- Order: Lepidoptera
- Family: Geometridae
- Subfamily: Geometrinae
- Genus: Xenochlorodes

Genus of moths

Xenochlorodes is a genus of moths in the family Geometridae.

== Species ==
- Xenochlorodes gilvescens
- Xenochlorodes magna
- Xenochlorodes nubigena
- Xenochlorodes olympiaria
