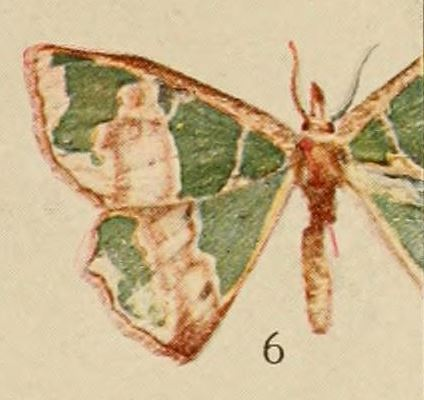

Scientific classification
- Kingdom: Animalia
- Phylum: Arthropoda
- Class: Insecta
- Order: Lepidoptera
- Family: Geometridae
- Genus: Archichlora
- Species: A. phyllobrota

Binomial name
- Archichlora phyllobrota (Holland, 1920)

Synonyms
- Osteosema phyllobrota Holland, 1920

= Archichlora phyllobrota =

Species of moth

Archichlora phyllobrota is a species of moth of the family Geometridae. It is found in central Africa and it is known from Gabon, Cameroon and Congo.
