= Hemistola flavitincta =

Scientific classification
- Kingdom: Animalia
- Phylum: Arthropoda
- Class: Insecta
- Order: Lepidoptera
- Family: Geometridae
- Genus: Hemistola
- Species: H. flavitincta

Binomial name
- Hemistola flavitincta Warren, 1897

Synonyms
- Herochroma flavitincta

Species of moth

Hemistola flavitincta is a moth in the family Geometridae first described by William Warren in . It is found in the Khasi Hills of India.
