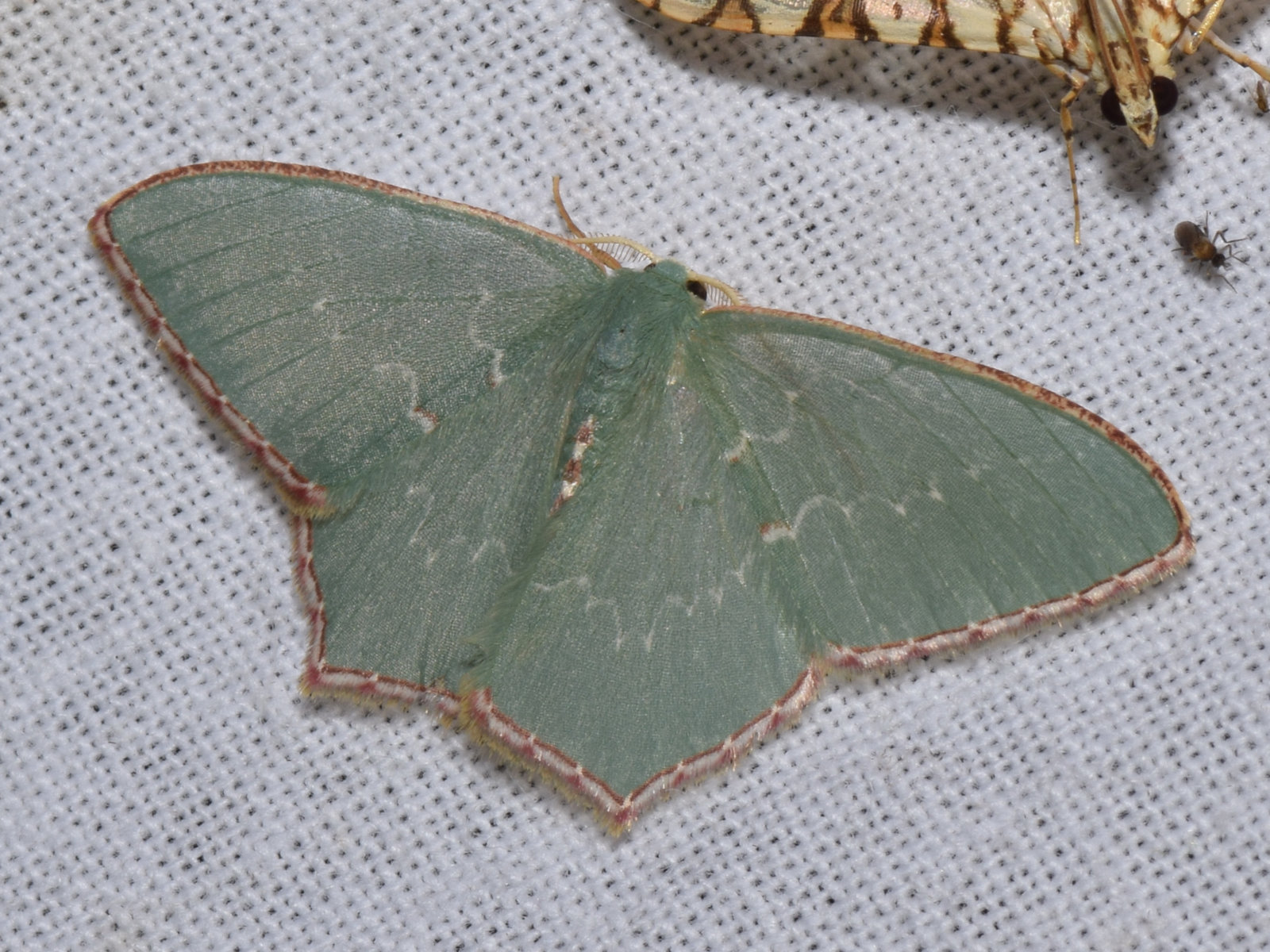
- Hemistola rubrimargo

Scientific classification
- Kingdom: Animalia
- Phylum: Arthropoda
- Clade: Pancrustacea
- Class: Insecta
- Order: Lepidoptera
- Family: Geometridae
- Tribe: Hemitheini
- Genus: Hemistola; Warren, 1893

= Hemistola =

Genus of moth

Hemistola is a genus of moths in the family Geometridae.

== Species ==
Species include:

- Hemistola aetherea Debauche, 1937
- Hemistola chrysoprasaria Esper, 1794
- Hemistola ereuthopeza Prout, 1925
- Hemistola flavitincta (Warren, 1897)
- Hemistola hypnopoea Prout, 1926
- Hemistola incommoda Prout, 1912
- Hemistola kezukai Inoue, 1978
- Hemistola liliana (Swinhoe, 1892)
- Hemistola monotona Inoue, 1983
- Hemistola orbiculosa Inoue, 1978
- Hemistola semialbida Prout, 1912
- Hemistola simplex Warren, 1899
- Hemistola tenuilinea (Alpheraky, 1897)
