= Hemistola liliana =

Scientific classification
- Kingdom: Animalia
- Phylum: Arthropoda
- Class: Insecta
- Order: Lepidoptera
- Family: Geometridae
- Genus: Hemistola
- Species: H. liliana

Binomial name
- Hemistola liliana (C. Swinhoe, 1892)

Synonyms
- Thalassodes liliana C. Swinhoe, 1892; Herochroma liliana

Species of moth

Hemistola liliana is a moth in the family Geometridae first described by Charles Swinhoe in 1892. It is found in the Khasi Hills of India.
