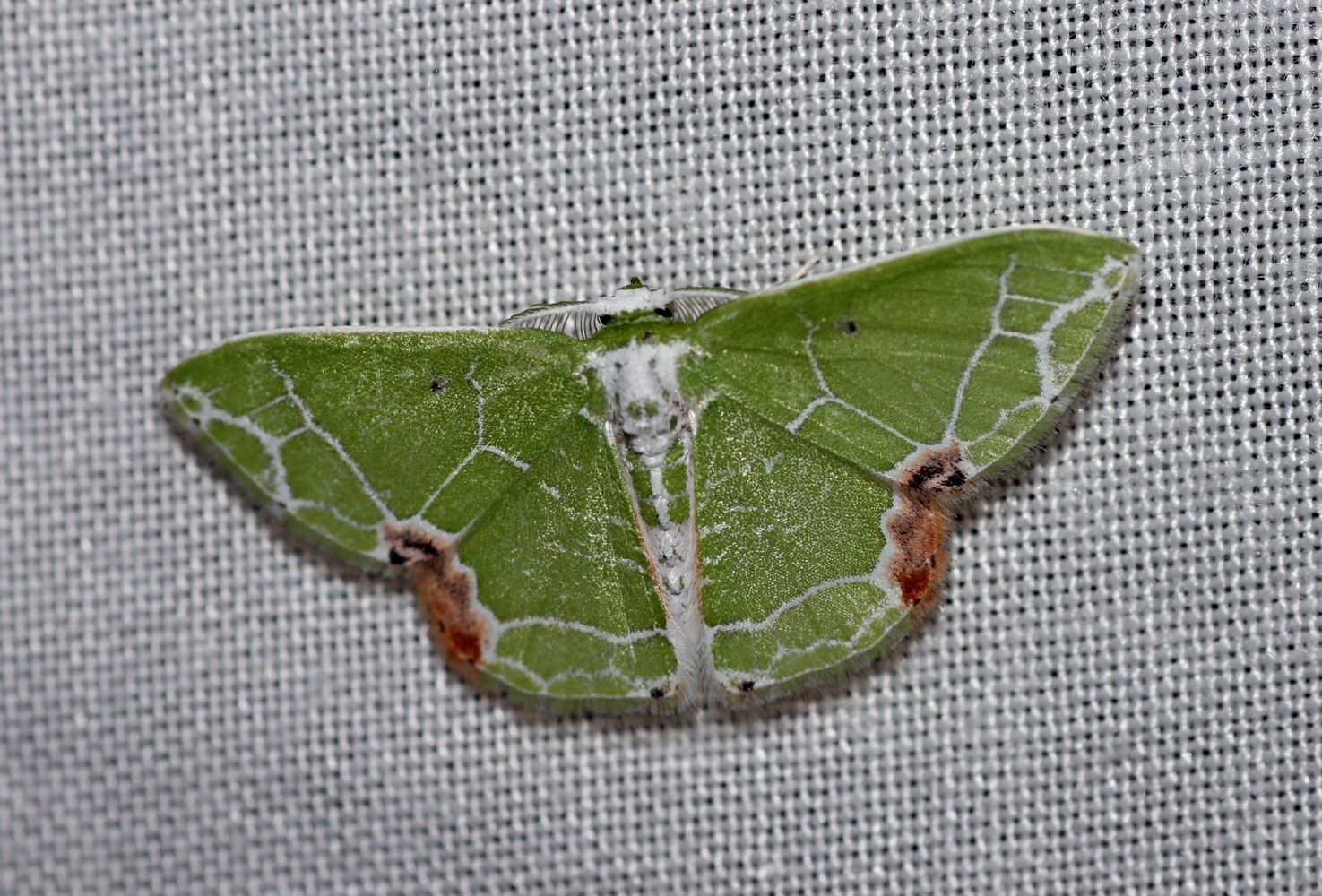

Scientific classification
- Domain: Eukaryota
- Kingdom: Animalia
- Phylum: Arthropoda
- Class: Insecta
- Order: Lepidoptera
- Family: Geometridae
- Genus: Protuliocnemis
- Species: P. biplagiata

Binomial name
- Protuliocnemis biplagiata (Moore, [1887])

Synonyms
- Comibaena biplagiata Moore, [1887]; Uliocnemis elegans Warren, 1899; Comibaena subornataria Rothschild, 1915; Uliocnemis elegans unidentata Prout, 1916; Phorodesma ceramicaria Oberthür, 1916; Phorodesma rookaria Oberthür, 1916; Uliocnemis elegans negligens Prout, 1925; Uliocnemis biplagiata (Moore, [1887])

= Protuliocnemis biplagiata =

Species of moth

Protuliocnemis biplagiata is a species of moth of the family Geometridae first described by Frederic Moore in 1887. It is found in Indo-Australian tropics east to New Caledonia (it is not present on the Solomons and Vanuatu).

The larvae have been recorded on Acacia species.
