= Prosomphax =

Scientific classification
- Kingdom: Animalia
- Phylum: Arthropoda
- Clade: Pancrustacea
- Class: Insecta
- Order: Lepidoptera
- Family: Geometridae
- Subfamily: Geometrinae
- Genus: Prosomphax; Warren, 1911

Type species
- Prosomphax callista Warren, 1911

Species
- 4, see text

Genus of moths

Prosomphax is a very small genus in the geometer moth family (Geometridae). As of 2005, only four species had been described; all are found in the southern half of Africa. This little-studied genus belongs to the emerald moth subfamily (Geometrinae), but beyond that its relationships are still rather obscure.

The species of Prosomphax are:

- Prosomphax callista Warren, 1911
- Prosomphax deuterurga Prout, 1922
- Prosomphax anomala (Warren, 1902)
- Prosomphax horitropha Krüger, 2005
