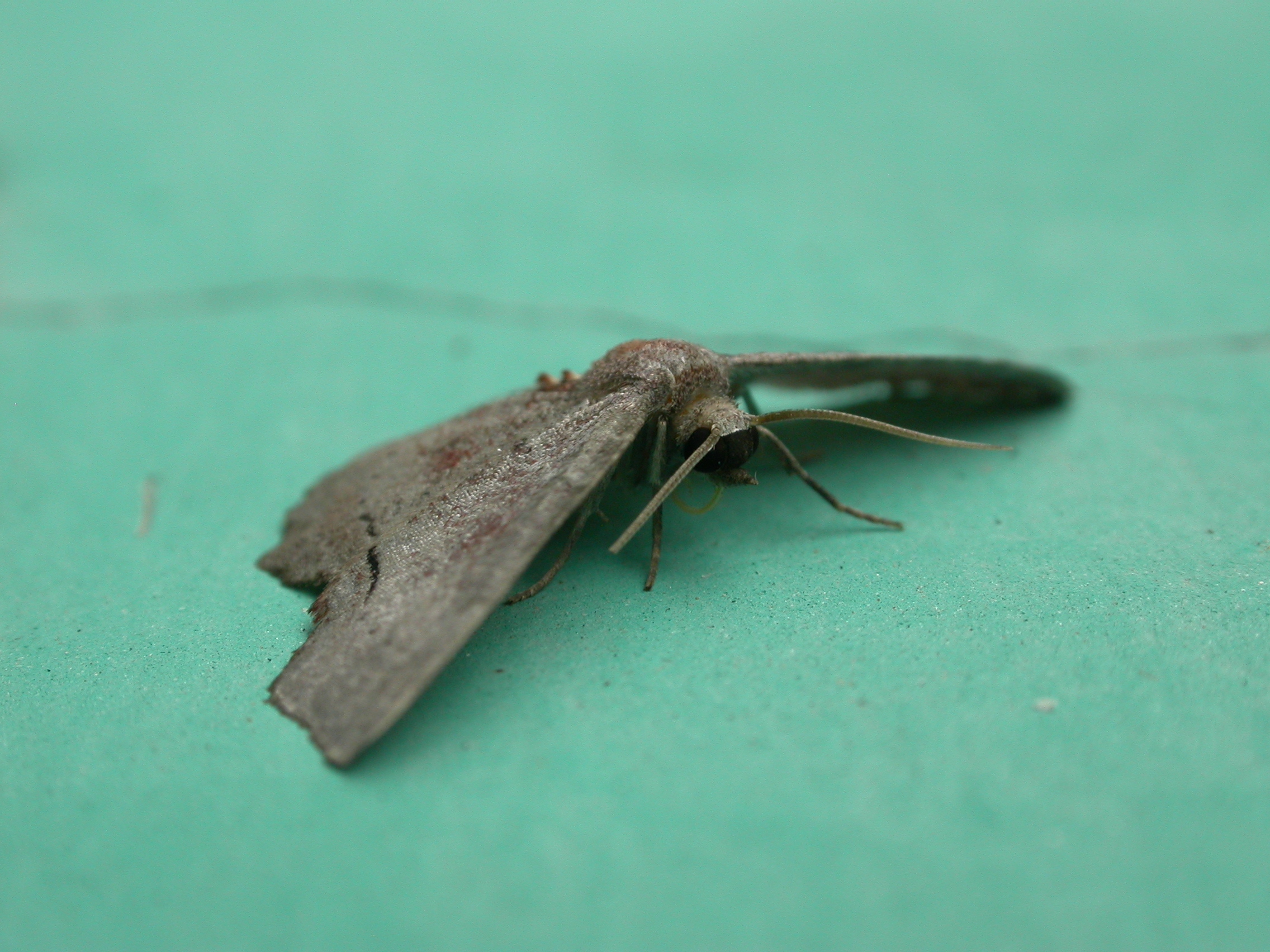

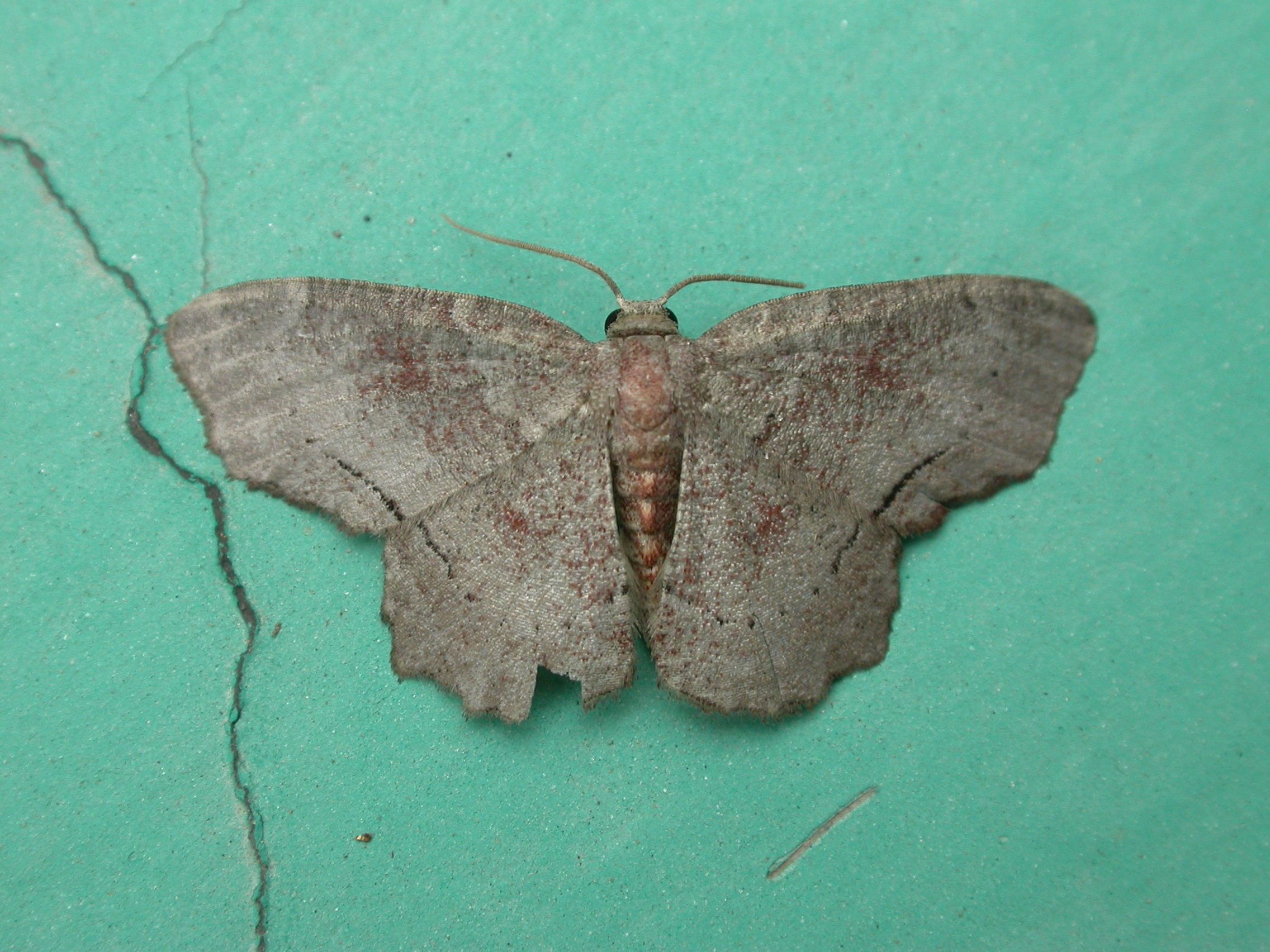

Scientific classification
- Kingdom: Animalia
- Phylum: Arthropoda
- Class: Insecta
- Order: Lepidoptera
- Family: Geometridae
- Subfamily: Geometrinae
- Genus: Xenozancla; Warren, 1893
- Species: X. versicolor

Binomial name
- Xenozancla versicolor Warren, 1893

= Xenozancla =

Genus of moths

Xenozancla is a monotypic moth genus in the family Geometridae. Its only species, Xenozancla versicolor, is found in northern India. Both the genus and species were first described by William Warren in 1893.
