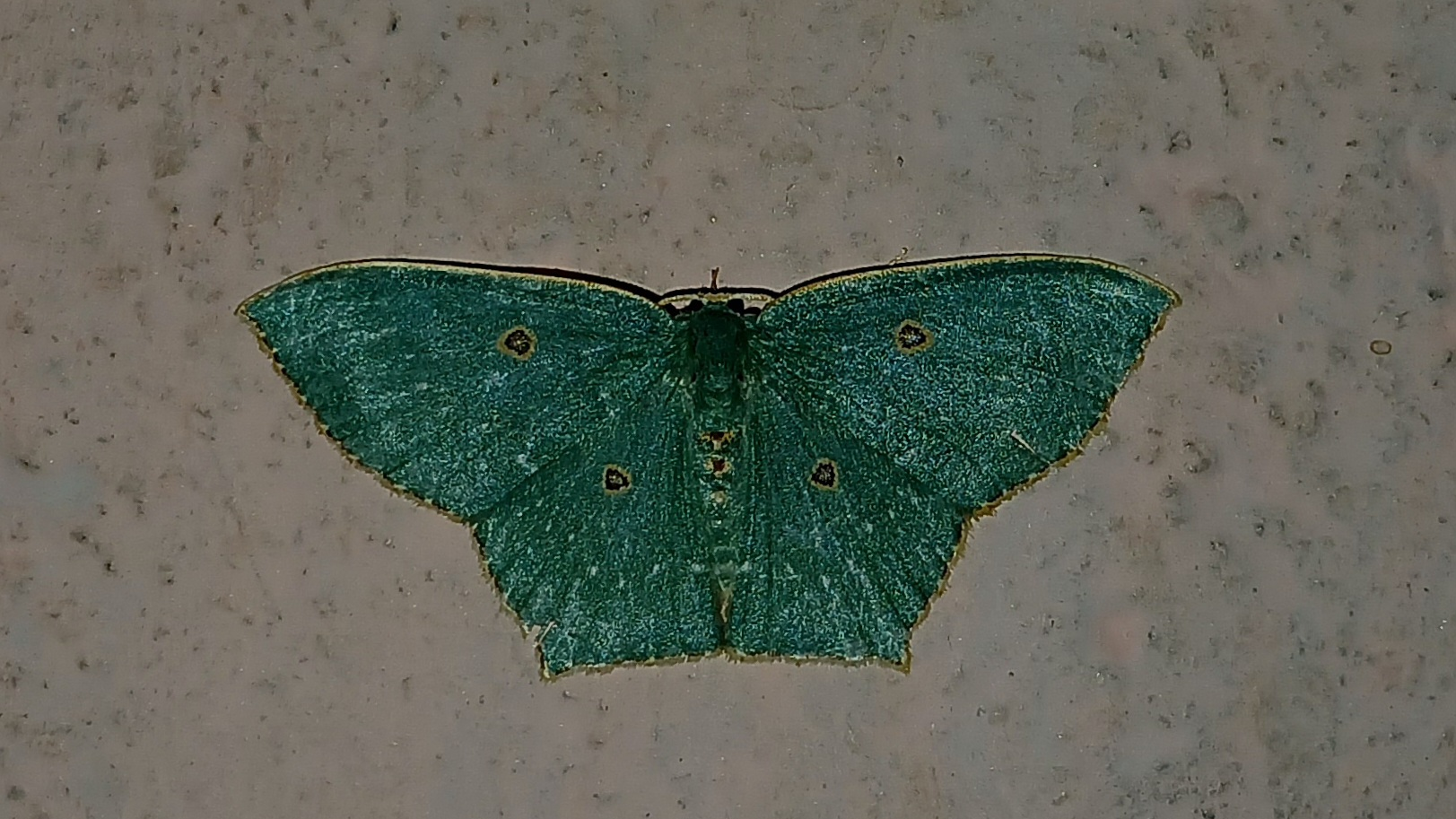

Scientific classification
- Kingdom: Animalia
- Phylum: Arthropoda
- Clade: Pancrustacea
- Class: Insecta
- Order: Lepidoptera
- Family: Geometridae
- Genus: Cyclothea
- Species: C. disjuncta

Binomial name
- Cyclothea disjuncta (Walker, 1861)

Synonyms
- Thalera disjuncta Walker, 1861

= Cyclothea disjuncta =

Species of moth

Cyclothea disjuncta is a moth of the family Geometridae first described by Francis Walker in 1861. It is found in Sri Lanka.
