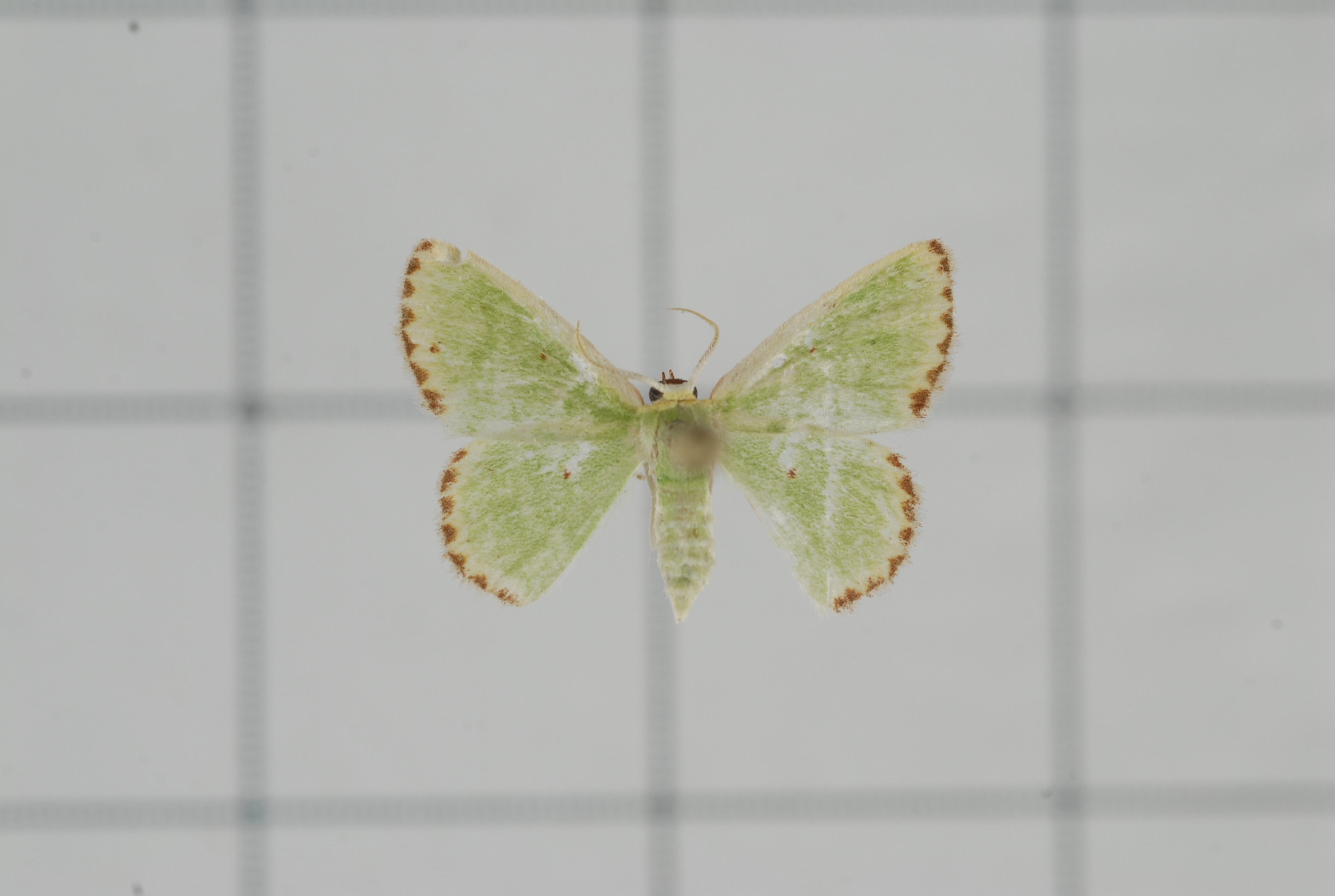

Scientific classification
- Kingdom: Animalia
- Phylum: Arthropoda
- Class: Insecta
- Order: Lepidoptera
- Family: Geometridae
- Genus: Eucrostes
- Species: E. disparata

Binomial name
- Eucrostes disparata (Walker, 1861)

Synonyms
- Iodis barnardae Lucas, 1891; Eucrostis [sic] disparata Walker, 1861; Geometra parvulata Walker, 1863; Eucrostis [sic] albicornaria Mabille, 1879; Eucrostis [sic] iocentra Meyrick, 1888; Iodis [sic] barnardae Lucas, 1891; Eucrostes rubridisca Warren, 1897; Eucrostes nanula Warren, 1897

= Eucrostes disparata =

Species of moth

Eucrostes disparata is a moth of the family Geometridae first described by Francis Walker in 1861. It is found in Sri Lanka, Ethiopia, Taiwan, Japan and Australia.

The wingspan of the adult is 15 mm. The adult has greenish wings with a broad brown margin. There are two white submarginal lines. A distinct red dot is found in the middle of each hindwing and a faint red dot in each forewing.
