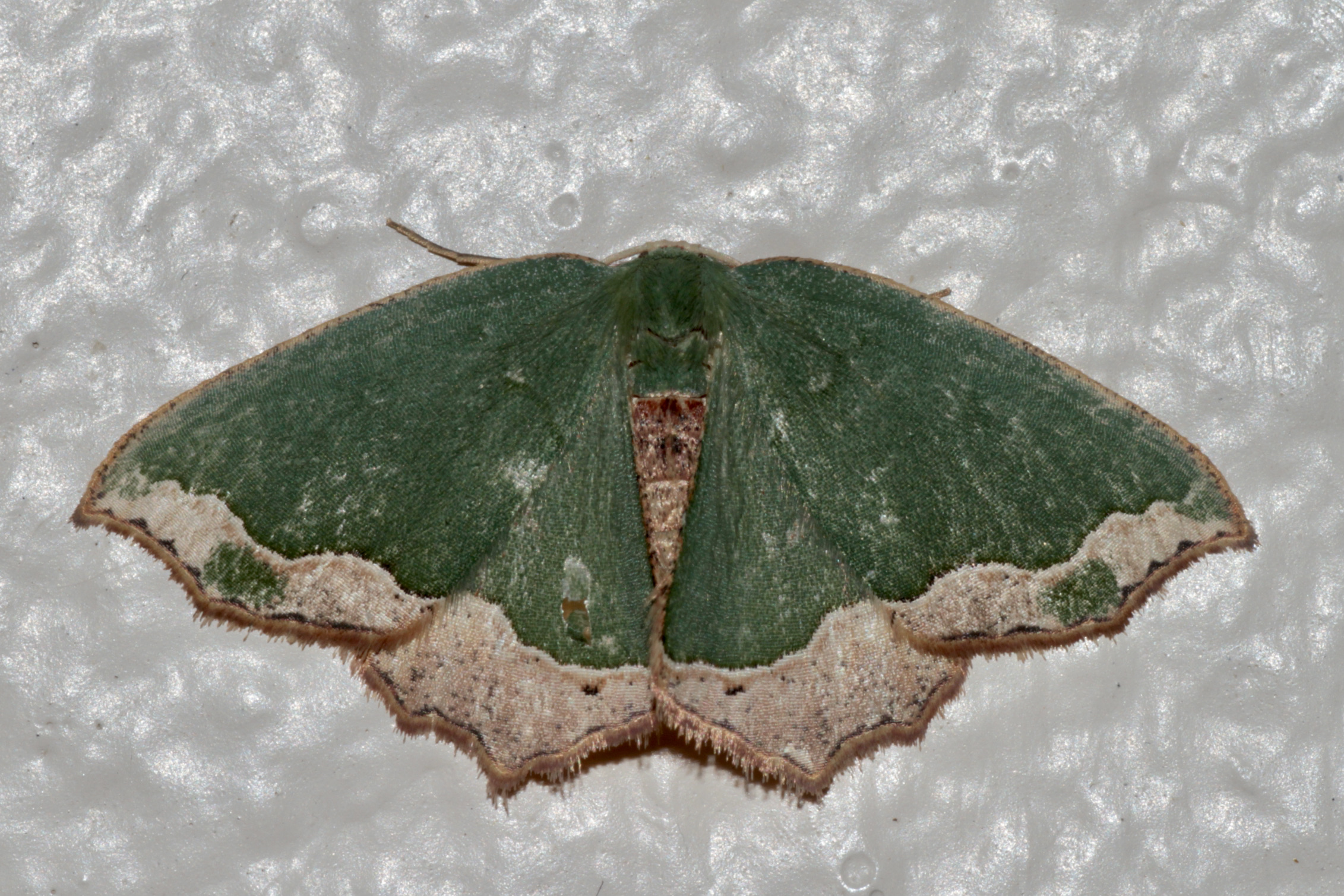
- Bathycolpodes chloronesis, KwaZulu-Natal, South Africa.

Scientific classification
- Kingdom: Animalia
- Phylum: Arthropoda
- Clade: Pancrustacea
- Class: Insecta
- Order: Lepidoptera
- Family: Geometridae
- Subfamily: Geometrinae
- Genus: Bathycolpodes; Prout, 1912

= Bathycolpodes =

Genus of moths

Bathycolpodes is an Afrotropial genus of moths in the family Geometridae.

== Species ==
- Bathycolpodes acoelopa Prout, 1912
- Bathycolpodes acutissima Herbulot, 1986
- Bathycolpodes anisotes Prout, 1912
- Bathycolpodes bassa Herbulot, 1986
- Bathycolpodes chloronesis Prout, 1930
- Bathycolpodes excavata Warren, 1898
- Bathycolpodes explanata Herbulot, 1986
- Bathycolpodes holochroa Prout, 1915
- Bathycolpodes implumis Prout, 1930
- Bathycolpodes kabaria Swinhoe, 1904
- Bathycolpodes marginata (Warren, 1897)
- Bathycolpodes melanceuthes Prout, 1922
- Bathycolpodes parexplanata Karisch & Hoppe, 2010
- Bathycolpodes pectinata Herbulot, 1992
- Bathycolpodes perdistincta Herbulot, 2003
- Bathycolpodes roehrichti Karisch, 2010
- Bathycolpodes scheeli Karisch & Hoppe, 2010
- Bathycolpodes semigrisea Warren, 1897
- Bathycolpodes subferrata Prout, 1930
- Bathycolpodes subfuscata Warren, 1902
- Bathycolpodes torniflorata Prout, 1917
- Bathycolpodes vegeta Prout, 1912
- Bathycolpodes vuattouxi Herbulot, 1972
