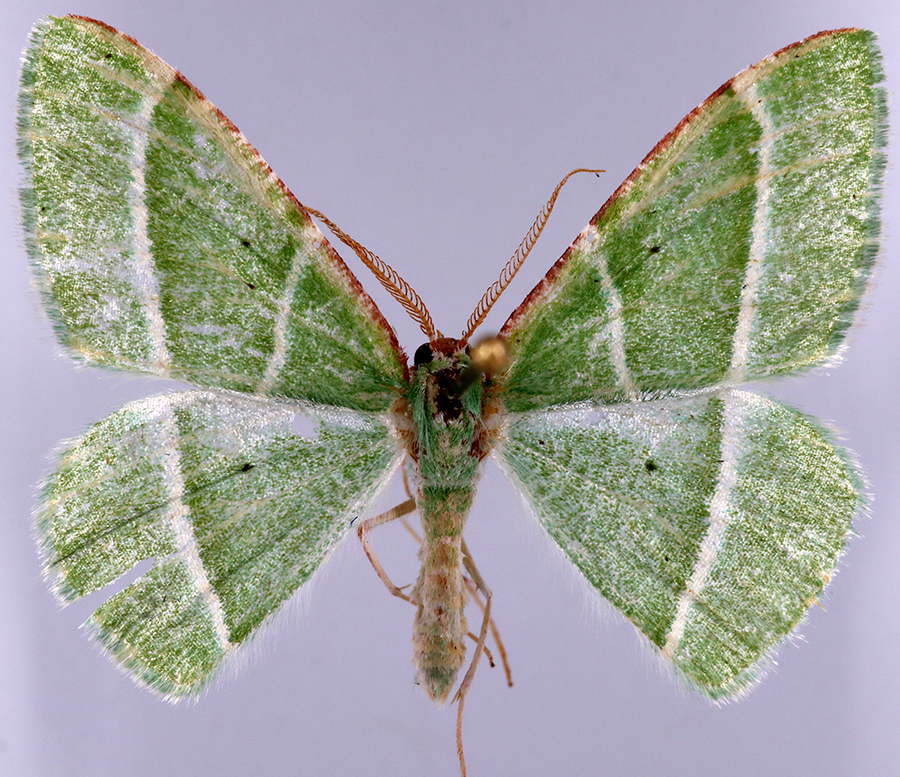

Scientific classification
- Kingdom: Animalia
- Phylum: Arthropoda
- Clade: Pancrustacea
- Class: Insecta
- Order: Lepidoptera
- Family: Geometridae
- Genus: Dichordophora
- Species: D. phoenix

Binomial name
- Dichordophora phoenix (Prout in Wytsman, 1912)

= Dichordophora phoenix =

Species of moth

Dichordophora phoenix, the phoenix emerald, is a species of emerald moth in the family Geometridae. It is found in North America.

The MONA or Hodges number for Dichordophora phoenix is 7057.
