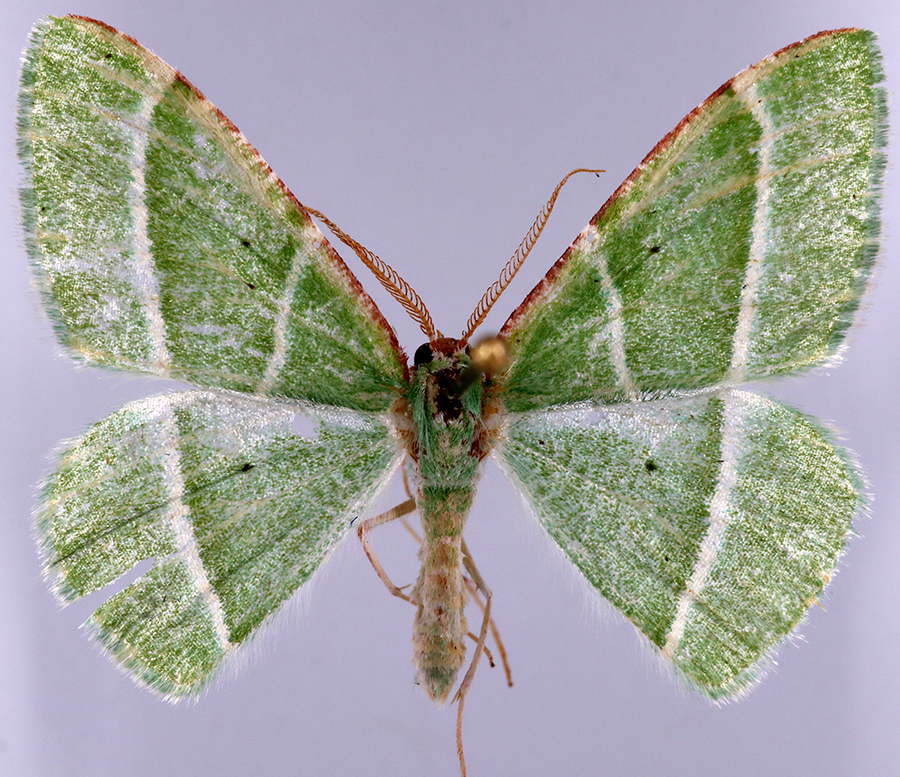

Scientific classification
- Kingdom: Animalia
- Phylum: Arthropoda
- Clade: Pancrustacea
- Class: Insecta
- Order: Lepidoptera
- Family: Geometridae
- Subfamily: Geometrinae
- Tribe: Dichordophorini; Ferguson, 1969
- Genus: Dichordophora; Prout, 1913

= Dichordophora =

Genus of moths

Dichordophora is a genus of moths in the family Geometridae first described by Louis Beethoven Prout in 1913. It is the only genus in the tribe Dichordophorini.

== Species ==
- Dichordophora aplagaria Dyar
- Dichordophora phoenix (Prout, 1912)
