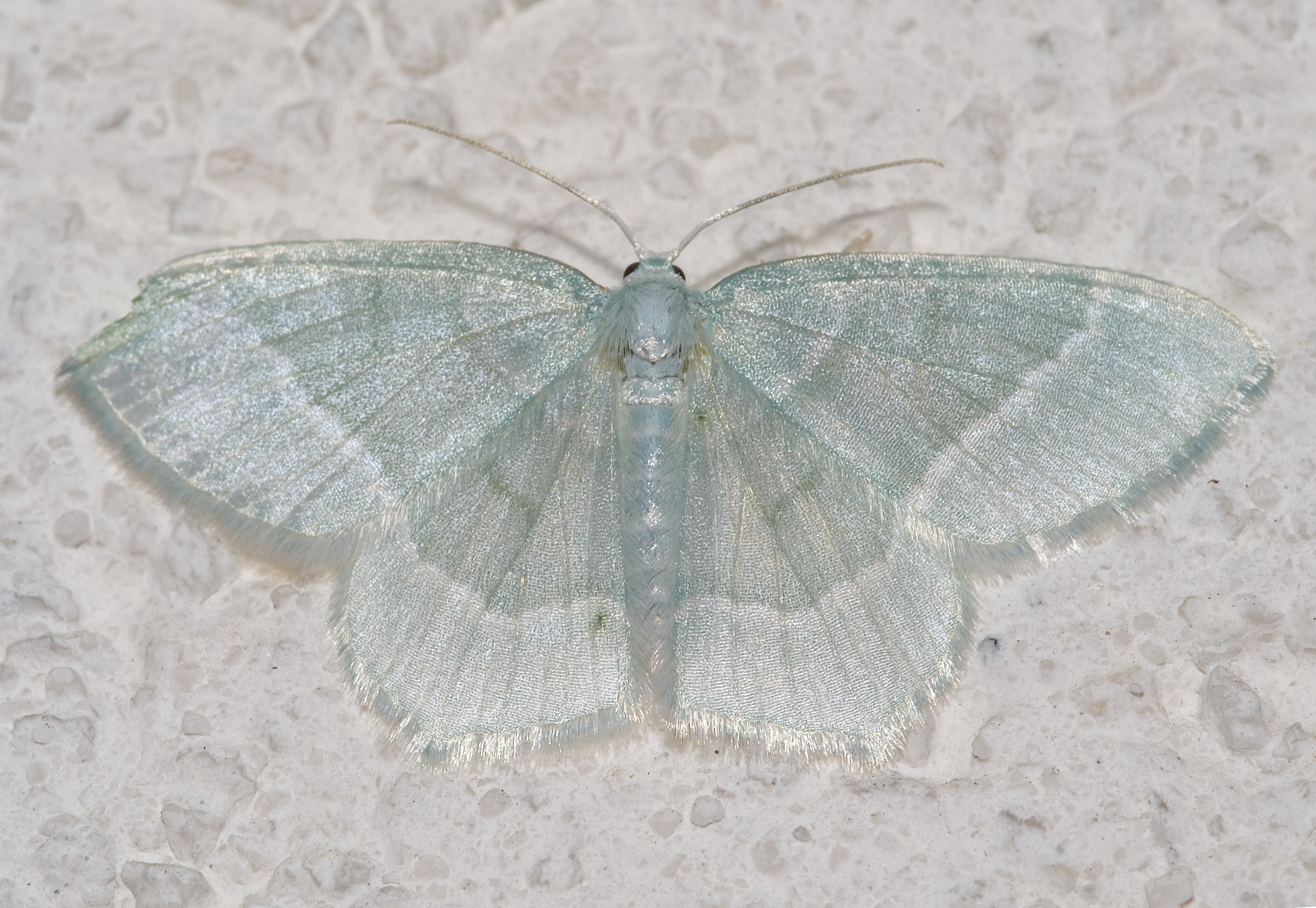
- Little emerald, Jodis lactearia (Hemitheini)

Scientific classification
- Kingdom: Animalia
- Phylum: Arthropoda
- Clade: Pancrustacea
- Class: Insecta
- Order: Lepidoptera
- Family: Geometridae
- Subfamily: Geometrinae; Leach, 1815

Tribes
- Ornithospilini; Agathiini; Hemitheini, (incl. Lophochoristini, Heliotheini, Hierochthoniini); Dysphaniini; Pseudoterpnini; Neohipparchini; Aracimini; Nemoriini; Synchlorini; Comibaenini; Timandromorphini; Geometrini; Dichordophorini; and see text

= Geometrinae =

Subfamily of moths

Geometrinae is the nominate subfamily of the geometer moth family (Geometridae). It is strongly split, containing a considerable number of tribes of which most are presently very small or monotypic. These small moths are often a light bluish green, leading to the common name of emerald moths, though a few species called thus are also found in the tribe Campaeini of the Ennominae. In 2018, a phylogeny and classification based on a molecular phylogenetic analysis was published in the Zoological Journal of the Linnean Society in which 13 tribes were accepted.

There are about 2,300 described species, mostly from the tropics.

== Selected genera and species ==
- Blotched emerald, Comibaena bajularia
- Dysphania: the genus of 'false tiger moths' of Asia
- Large emerald, Geometra papilionaria
- Essex emerald, Thetidia smaragdaria

== Genera incertae sedis ==
Some geometrine genera have not been definitely assigned to a tribe. These include:

- Bathycolpodes
- Bustilloxia
- Chlorodontopera
- Eucrostes
- Kuchleria
- Prosomphax
- Xenochlorodes
- Xenozancla
