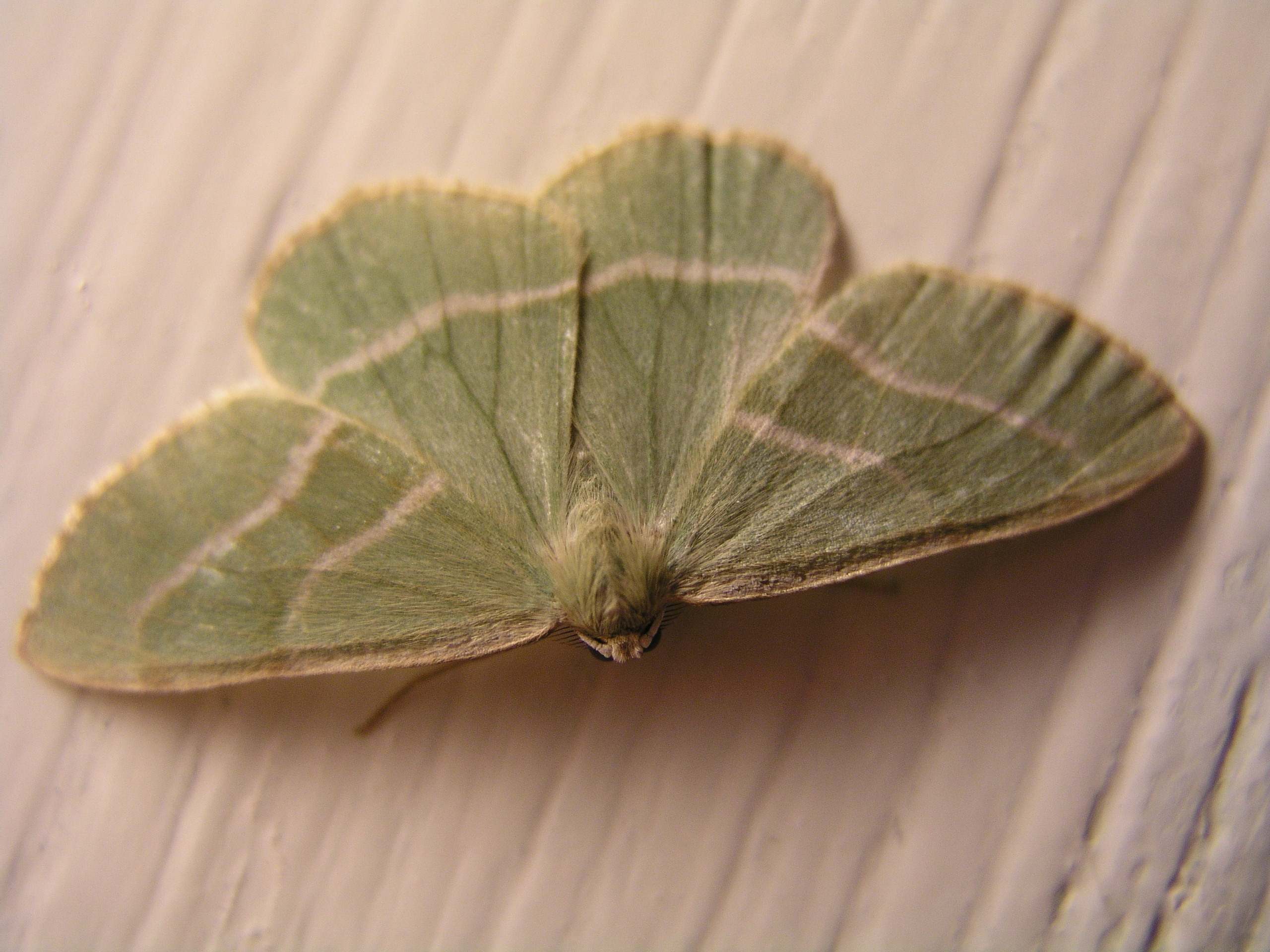

Scientific classification
- Kingdom: Animalia
- Phylum: Arthropoda
- Class: Insecta
- Order: Lepidoptera
- Family: Geometridae
- Genus: Hylaea
- Species: H. fasciaria

Binomial name
- Hylaea fasciaria (Linnaeus, 1758)

= Hylaea fasciaria =

Species of moth

Hylaea fasciaria, the barred red, is a species of moth in the family Geometridae. The species can be found in central and northern Europe, the Urals, Caucasus, Altai and eastern Siberia.

The wingspan is 27–40 mm. The forma fasciaria has a rust-red leaf colour, the forma prasinaria has green coloured wings. Both have on the front wings two slightly irregular curved, thin transverse bands, the midfield thus closed has usually a slightly darker colour. These bands are pale whitish coloured in the rust-red form, in the green form the colouring varies from pale whitish to beige to light brown. In addition in the green form the front edge of the front wing (costa) is weakly coloured in the same shade, the outer edge of both pairs of wings is fringed in this colour. The hindwings are usually somewhat lighter in colour and have a more or less clear, pale cross line in the second half of the wing. In addition to the two main forms, there are other colour variants with different shades of green or plain brown.

"Linne twice described this species; first a worn, greyish red form, then on the following page (as prosapiaria) a brighter red example. Both forms show the 2 curved lines of the forewing and 1 on the hindwing. — ab. grisearia Fuchs differs little from Linnes first type, but is stillgreyer. Frequent in Scotland. Also recorded from Germany and Austria. — ab. manitaria H.-Sch. is of a umform dark liver-colour with the lines obliterated. — ab. cinereostrigaria Klem. has the lines dark grey instead of white. The type specimens (females) were also narrow-winged. — ab. ochreochrearia Joan. (= ochracearia Rbl.) is clear ochreous, nearly as in Ennomos erosaria ab. intermediaria Gmpbg. is a transitional form, green with red costal margin, fringes, and edging to the lines. — prasinaria Schiff. is an interesting green form with the white lines usually well-developed and is common in some localities, the larva feeding on pines and spruce fir, while that of typical fasciaria feeds on Scotch fir. ab. extiticta Vorbr. Mull-Rutz is a modification of prasinaria, darker green with the white lines almost or entirely obsolete."

The moths fly in two generations from April to October..

The caterpillars feed on coniferous trees, including Pinus sylvestris and Picea abies.

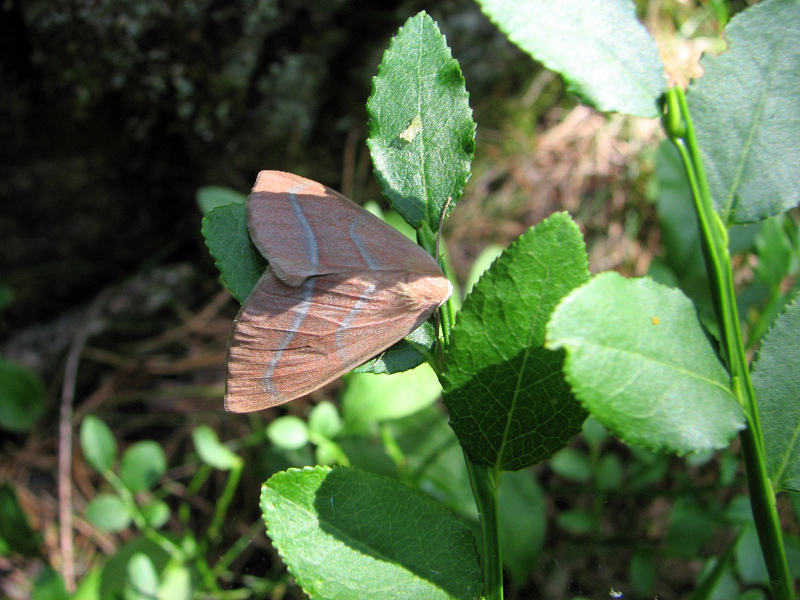

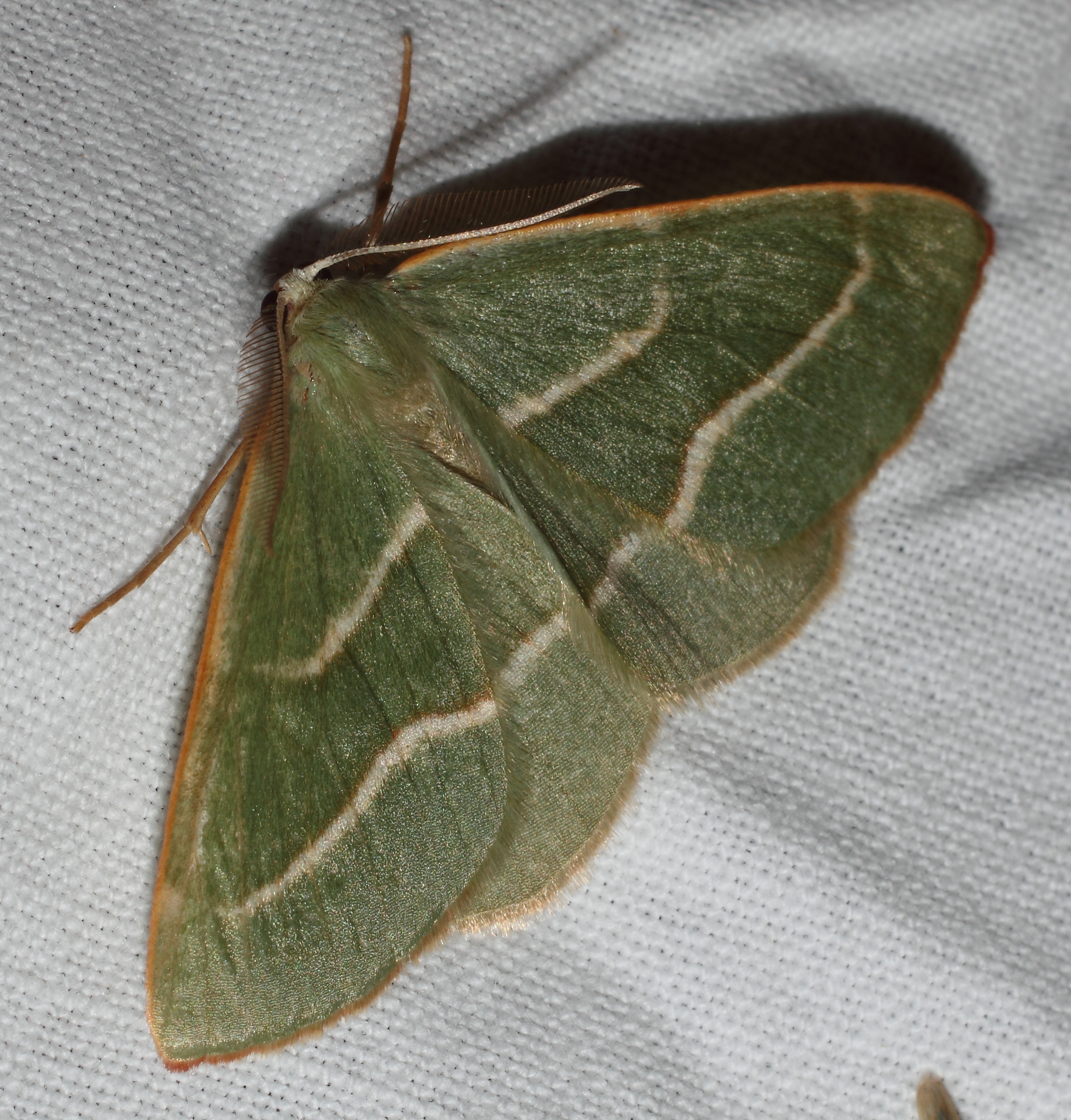

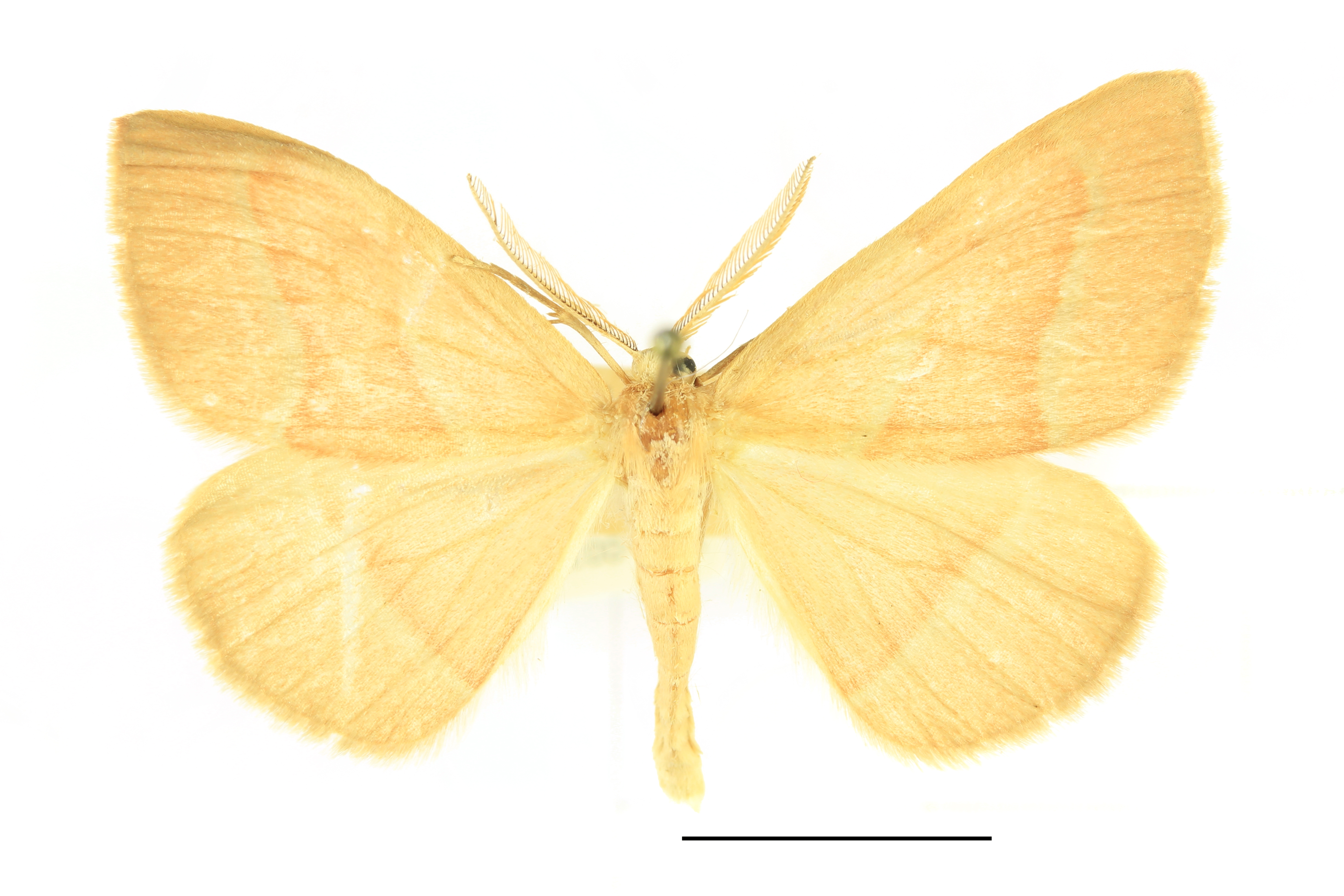
Museum specimen

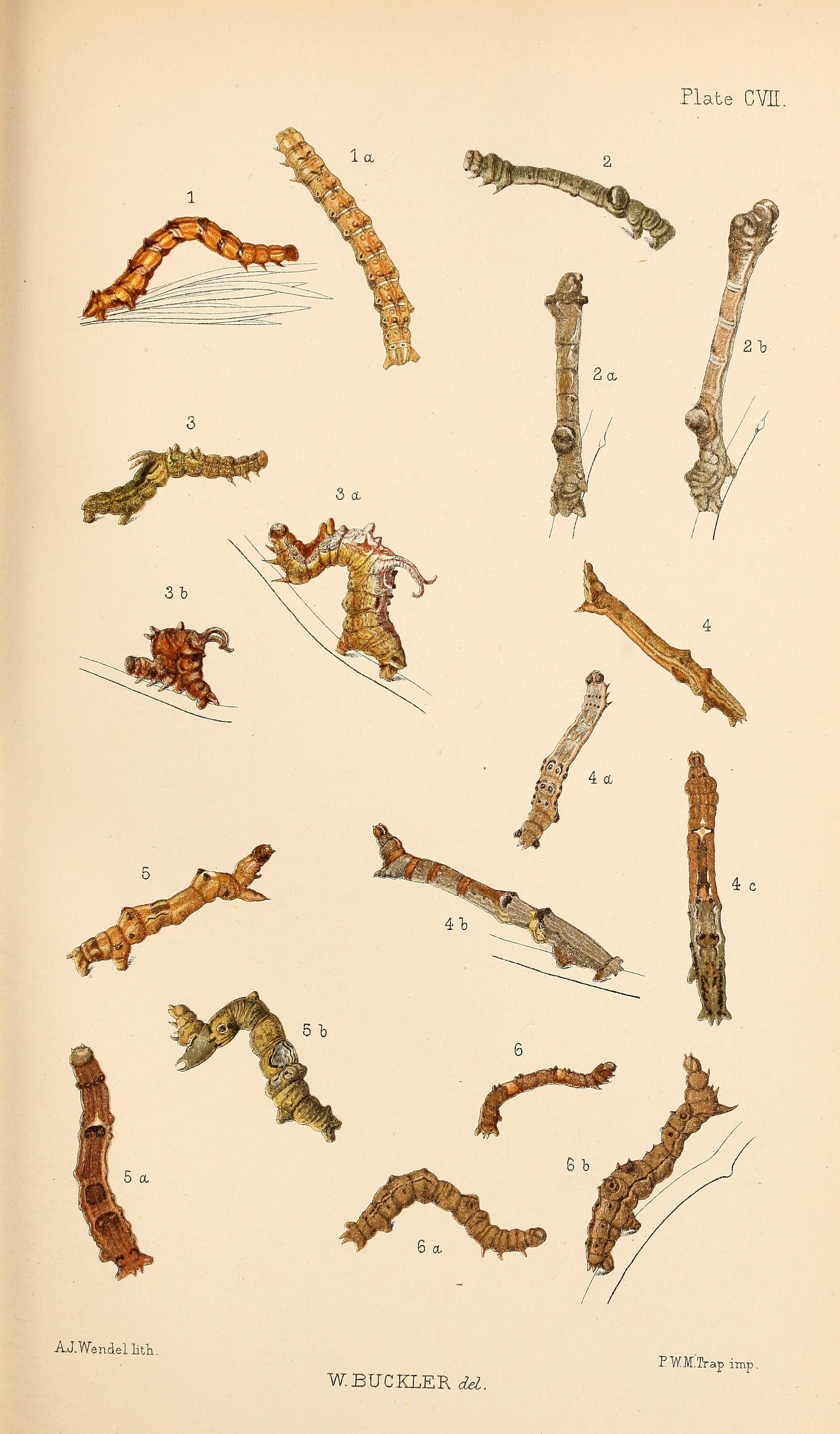
Fig.1, 1a Larva after final moult
