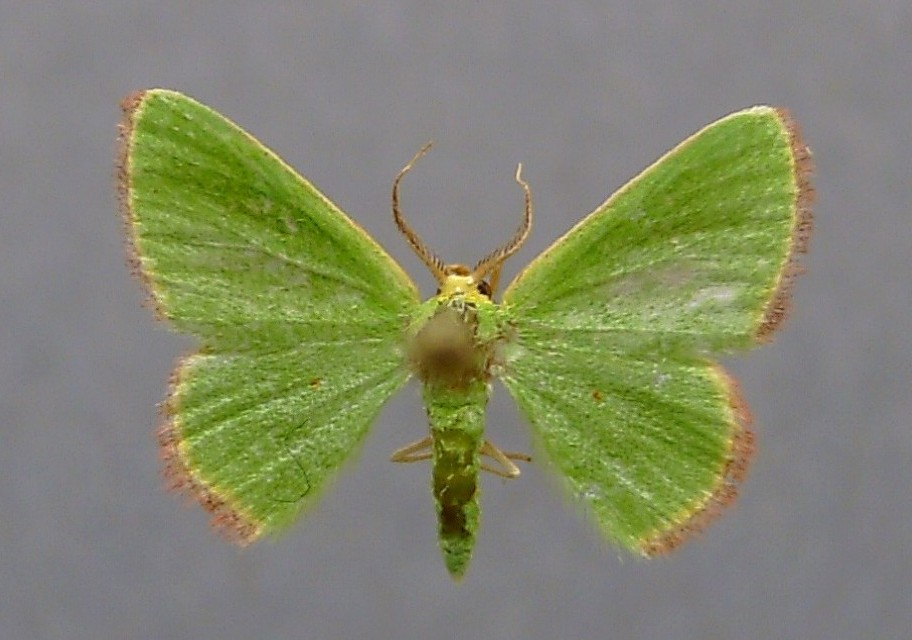

Scientific classification
- Kingdom: Animalia
- Phylum: Arthropoda
- Clade: Pancrustacea
- Class: Insecta
- Order: Lepidoptera
- Family: Geometridae
- Tribe: Hemitheini
- Genus: Eucrostes; Hübner, [1823]

Type species
- Eucrostes indigenata (Villers, 1789)

Synonyms
- Euchrostis Zeller, 1872 (emend.); Euchrostes Gumppenberg, 1887 (emend.)

= Eucrostes =

Genus of moths

Eucrostes is a genus of moths in the family Geometridae. It was erected by Jacob Hübner in 1823.

== Description ==
Palpi reaching just beyond the frons and roughly scaled. Antennae of male bipectinate (comb like on both sides) for two-thirds of their length. Hind tibia with one spur pair in both sexes. Forewings with veins 3 and 4 from angle of cell and vein 6 from upper angle. Veins 7, 8, 9 and 10 stalked and vein 11 anastomosing (fusing) with vein 12. Hindwings with frenulum absent. The outer margin rounded. Veins 3, 4 and 6, 7 stalked.

== Species ==
- Eucrostes astigmatica L. B. Prout, 1916
- Eucrostes beatificata (Walker, 1863)
- Eucrostes disparata (Walker, 1861)
- Eucrostes indigenata (Villers, 1789) (Mediterranean)
- Eucrostes pygmaea Rebel, 1907
- Eucrostes rhodophthalma L. B. Prout, 1912
- Eucrostes rufociliaria Herrich-Schäffer, 1855
- Eucrostes solivaga Herbulot, 1972

== Former species ==
- Eucrostes kafebera Swinhoe, 1894 (from India)
