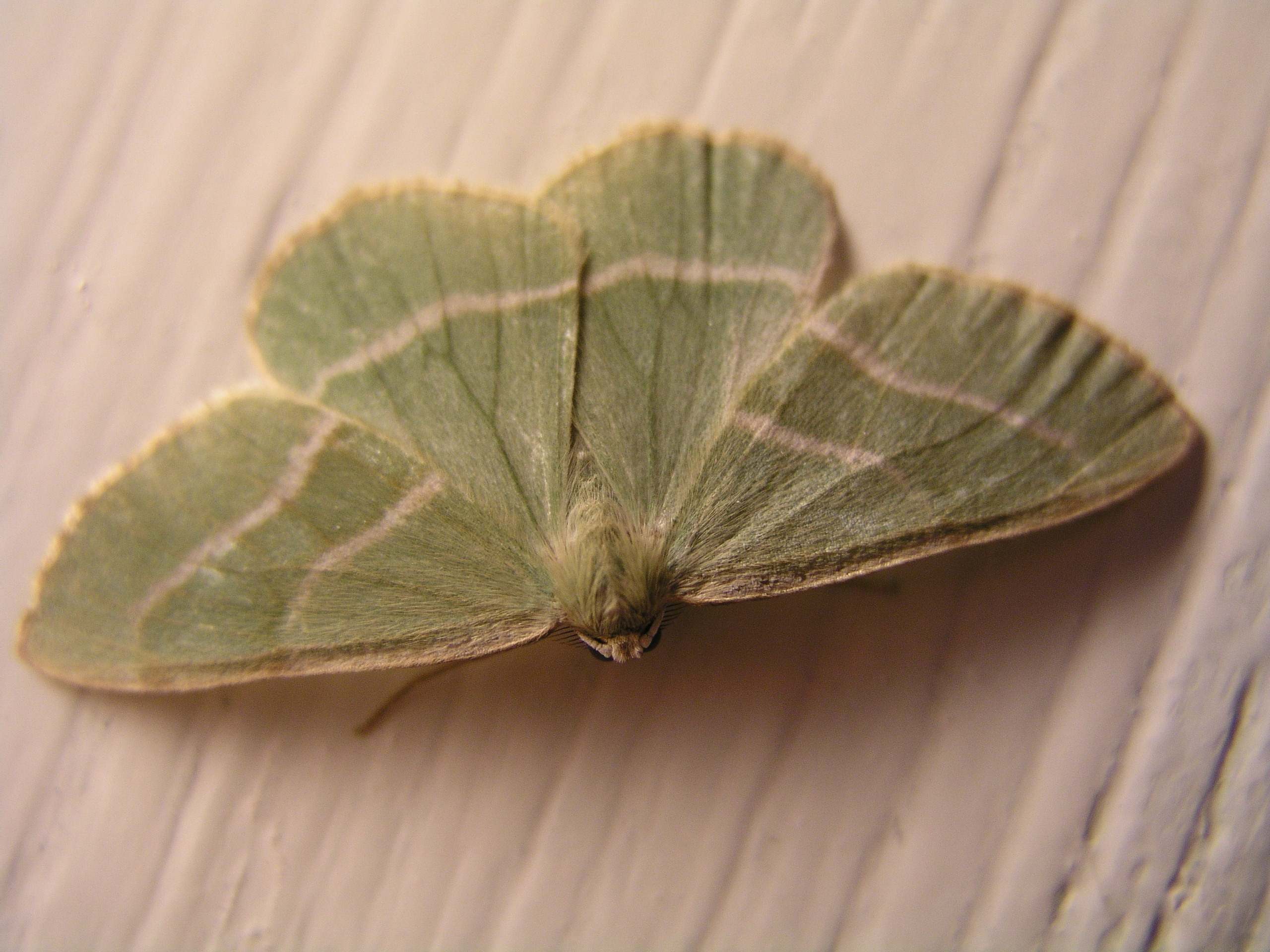
- Hylaea fasciaria

Scientific classification
- Domain: Eukaryota
- Kingdom: Animalia
- Phylum: Arthropoda
- Class: Insecta
- Order: Lepidoptera
- Family: Geometridae
- Tribe: Campaeini
- Genus: Hylaea; Hübner, 1822

= Hylaea (moth) =

Genus of moths

Hylaea is a genus of moths in the family Geometridae erected by Jacob Hübner in 1822.

== Species ==
Species include:

- Hylaea fasciaria (Linnaeus, 1758) – barred red
- Hylaea pinicolaria (Bellier, 1861)
