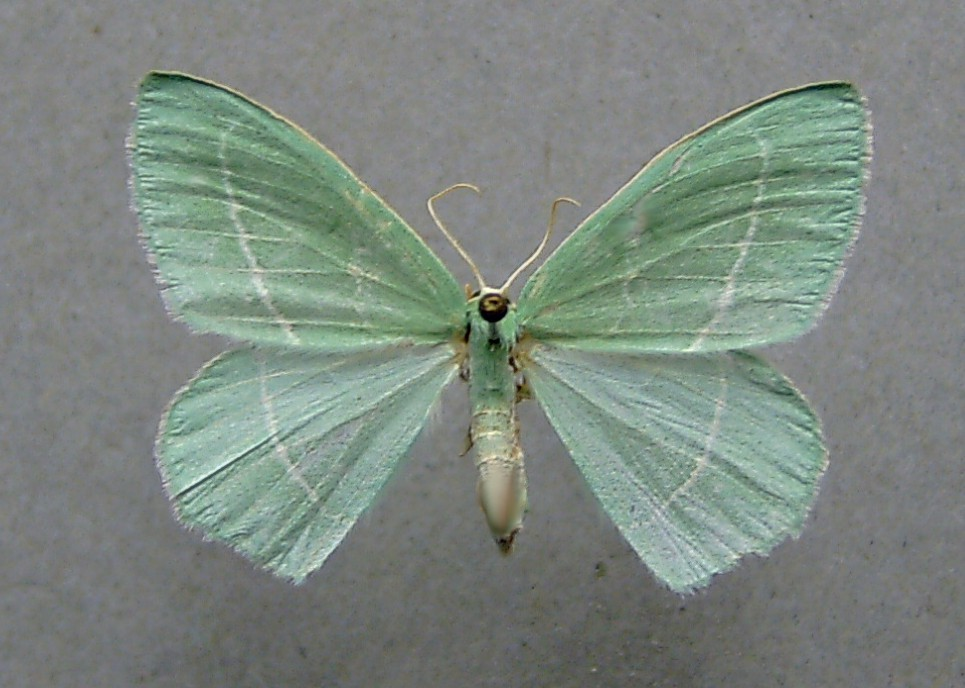

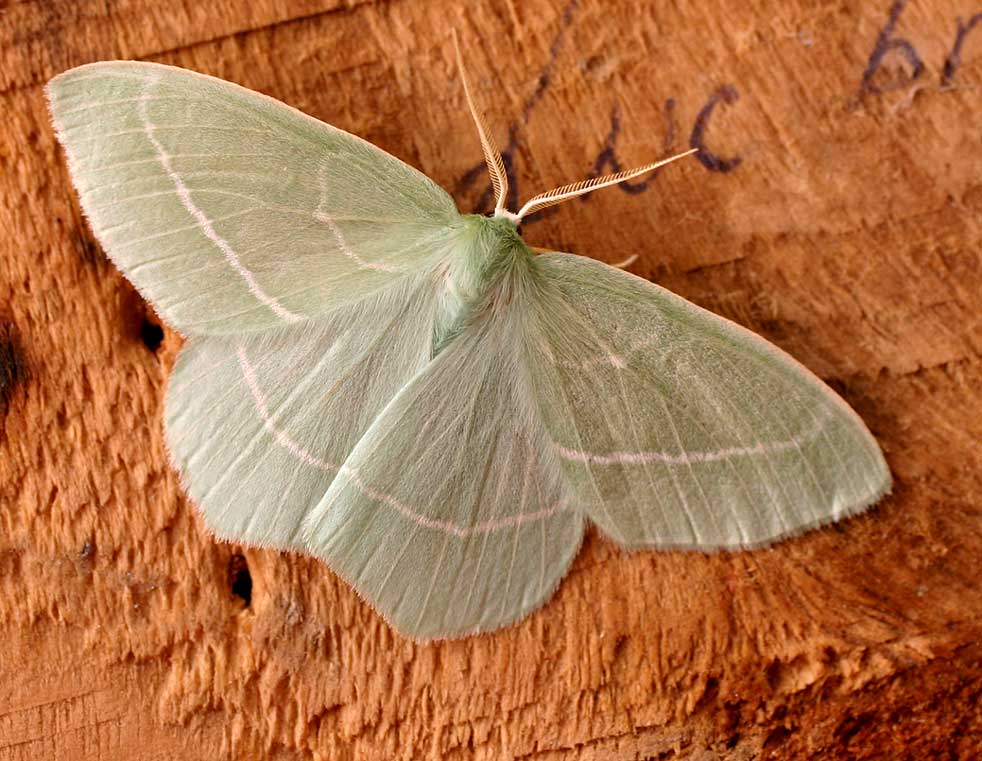

Scientific classification
- Kingdom: Animalia
- Phylum: Arthropoda
- Clade: Pancrustacea
- Class: Insecta
- Order: Lepidoptera
- Family: Geometridae
- Genus: Hemistola
- Species: H. chrysoprasaria

Binomial name
- Hemistola chrysoprasaria (Esper, 1794)

= Hemistola chrysoprasaria =

Species of moth

Hemistola chrysoprasaria, the small emerald, is a moth of the family Geometridae. The species can be found in all Europe including the Iberian Peninsula and Russia East to the Ural Mountains, North Africa, Asia Minor, Transcaucasia and the mountains of Eastern Asia (Russian Far East, Siberia), (Amur, Ussuri) and China Tian Shan (as form lissas)

== Description ==
The wingspan is 28–32 mm. Both forewings and hindwings are light-green coloured, but fade with increasing life span to yellow-green to yellow-white. There is an outer and a fainter inner, slightly curved and continuous, white cross line on the front wings. The inner (antemedian) is strongly curved and usually with two small, slight teeth directed distad, the outer (postmedian) is nearly parallel with distal margin, not dentate. The outer line continues on the hindwing. There is no discal stain. The antennae of the males are slightly combed, those of females short ciliate. In Amur and Ussuri the specimens are often large and with the lines rather widely separated. Lissas differs in the shape of the hindwing, which is rounded instead of elbowed

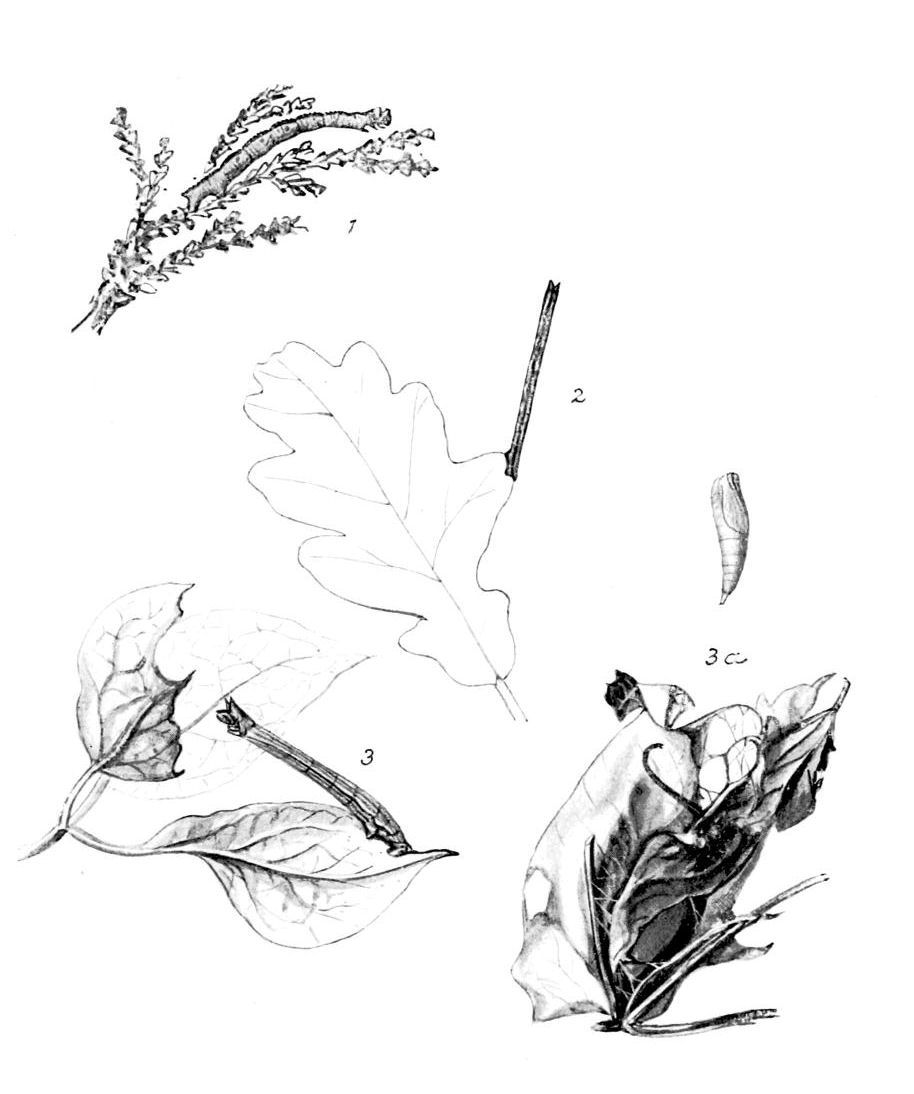
figs 3, 3a larva, pupa and cocoon

The fresh egg is green color and discolours into dark tints just before hatching. It is very flattened on both sides. The egg pole is lateral The caterpillars show a variable cryptic coloration. They are green at first, then brownish during hibernation and green again in spring. The pupa has a green colour.

== Biology ==
The moths fly in one generation from June to August..

The larvae feed on Clematis vitalba.

Habitats include edges of woods, hedges areas as well as gardens and parks. It prefers warm slopes.

== Subspecies ==
- H. c. chrysoprasaria Central Europe, South Europe, South Russia, South Urals - SouthEast Siberia, Turkey, Caucasus, Georgia,
- H. c. lissas Prout, 1912 Tianshan
- H. c. intermedia Djakonov, 1926 mountains (South Siberia)
- H. c. occidentalis Wehrli, 1929 South Spain, South Portugal, Morocco, Algeria, Tunisia

== Sister species ==
Allopatric with Hemistola siciliana (Prout, 1935) (Middle and South Italy, Sicily)

== Notes ==
1. The flight season refers to the British Isles. This may vary in other parts of the range.
