= Bustilloxia =

Scientific classification
- Kingdom: Animalia
- Phylum: Arthropoda
- Class: Insecta
- Order: Lepidoptera
- Family: Geometridae
- Tribe: Microloxiini
- Genus: Bustilloxia; Expósito, 1979

Genus of moths

Bustilloxia is a genus of moths in the family Geometridae.

== Species ==
- Bustilloxia saturata (A. Bang-Haas, 1906)
