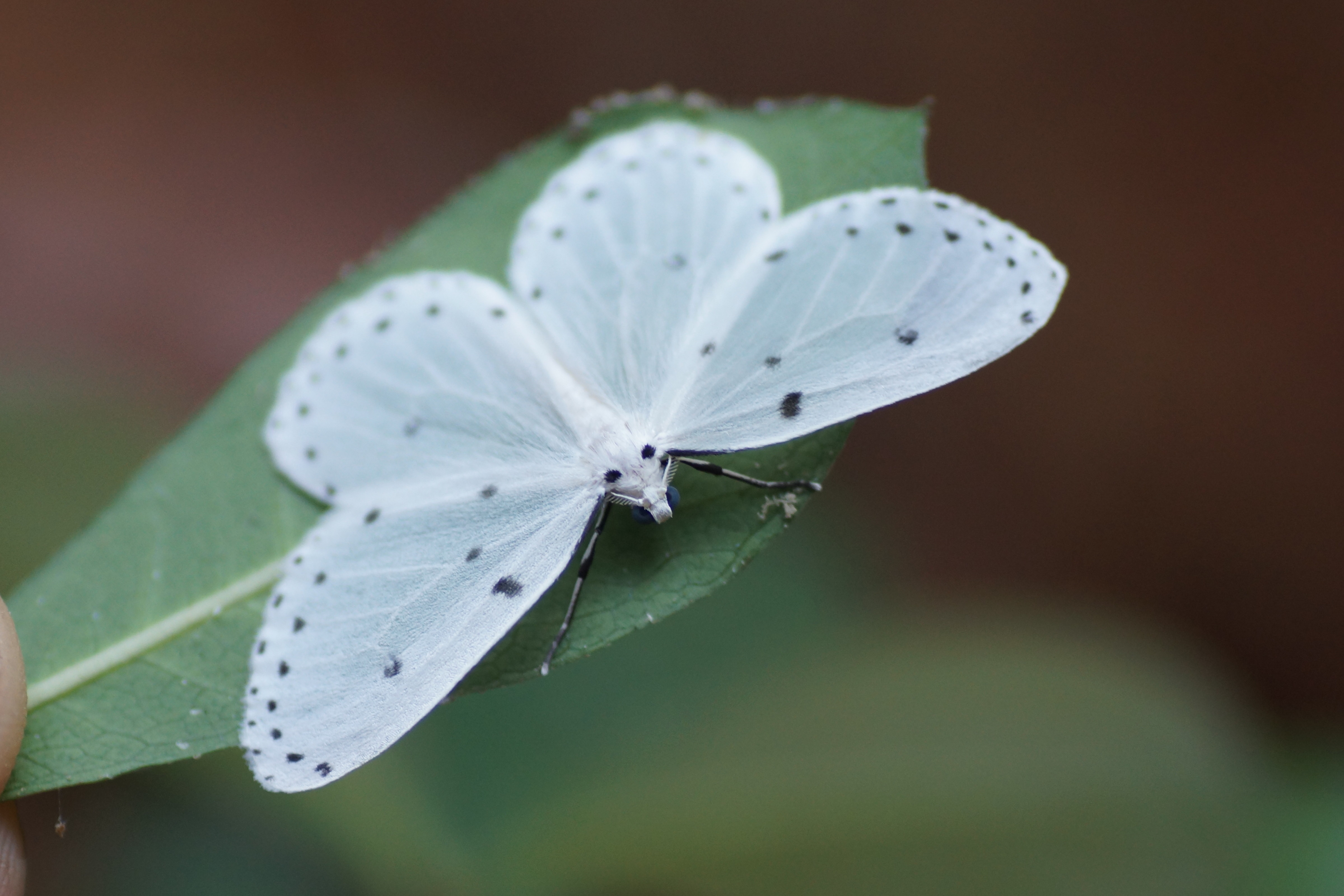
- Naxa textilis
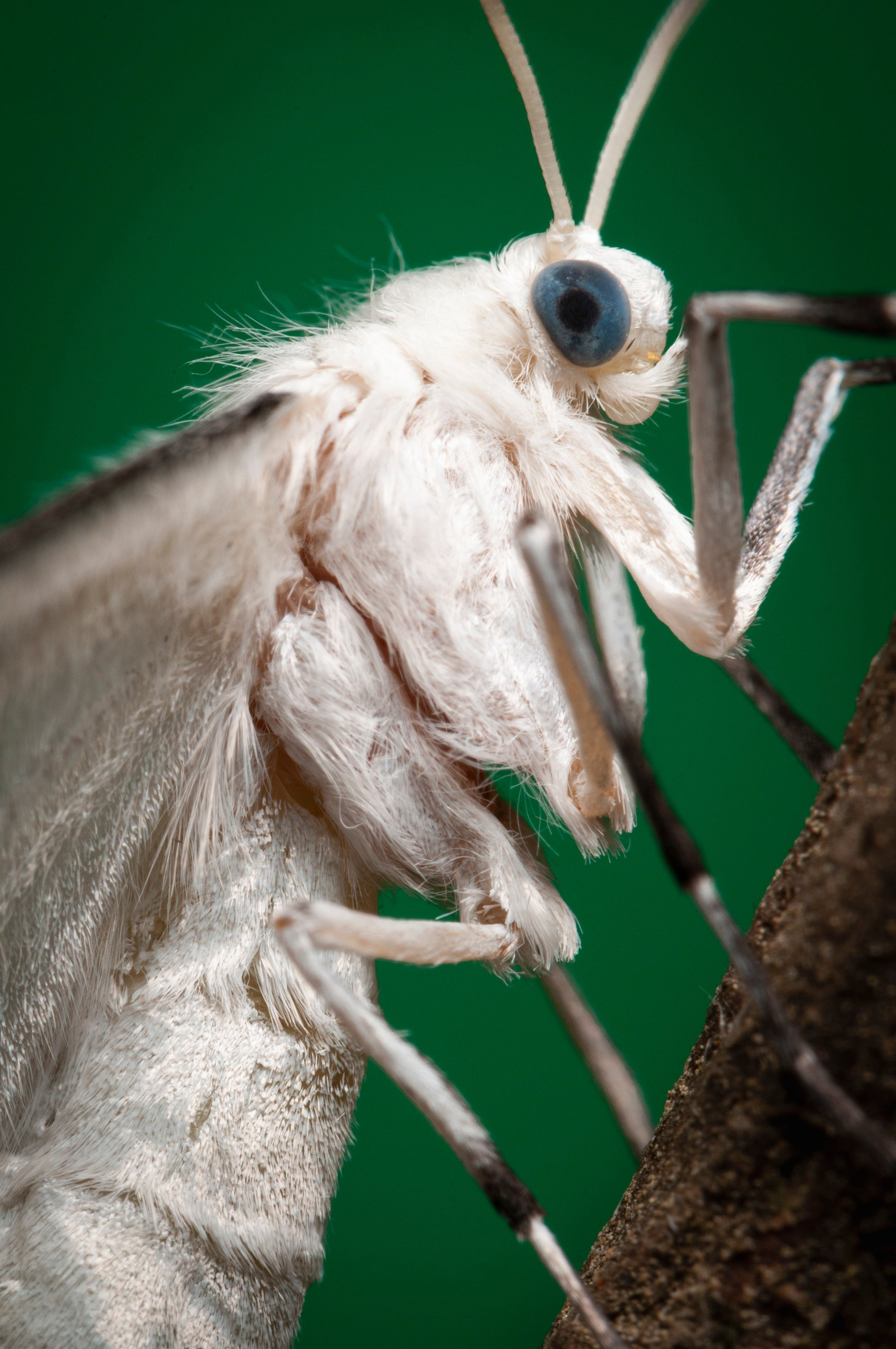
- Naxa seriaria, Adult, Korea

Scientific classification
- Kingdom: Animalia
- Phylum: Arthropoda
- Clade: Pancrustacea
- Class: Insecta
- Order: Lepidoptera
- Family: Geometridae
- Subfamily: Orthostixinae
- Genus: Naxa; Walker, 1856

Synonyms
- Desmonaxa Prout, 1912; Psilonaxa Warren, 1893

= Naxa (moth) =

Genus of moths

Naxa is a genus of moths in the family Geometridae described by Francis Walker in 1856.

== Species ==
- Naxa angustaria Leech, 1897 central China
- Naxa guttulata Warren, 1894 Borneo, Sumatra
- Naxa kerangatis Holloway, 1996 Borneo
- Naxa seriaria (Motschulsky, 1866) Amur, Primorye, Japan, Korea, north-eastern China
- Naxa taicoumaria (Orza, 1869) Japan
- Naxa textilis Walker, 1856 Bangladesh
