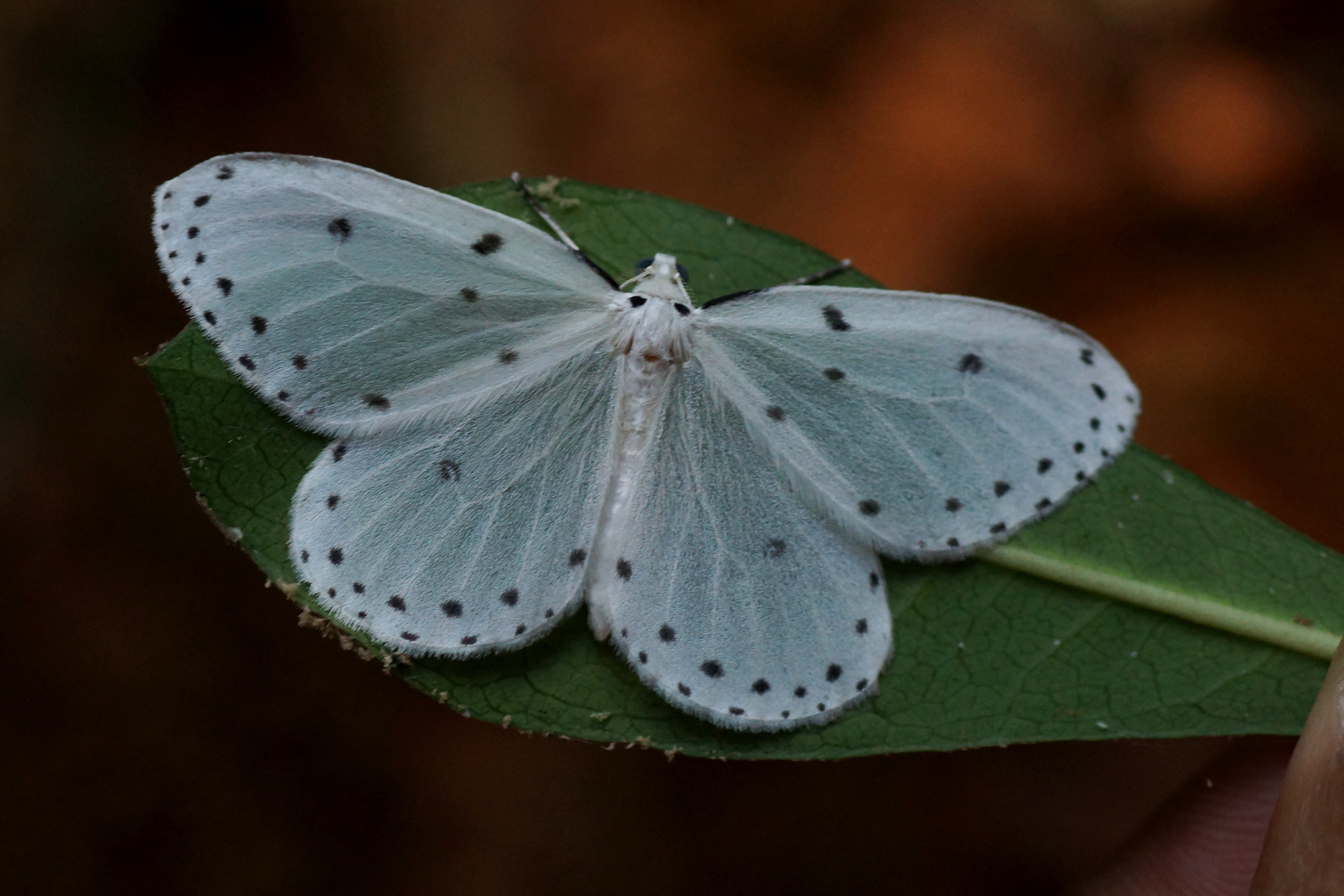

Scientific classification
- Kingdom: Animalia
- Phylum: Arthropoda
- Class: Insecta
- Order: Lepidoptera
- Family: Geometridae
- Genus: Naxa
- Species: N. textilis

Binomial name
- Naxa textilis Preyer 1884

= Naxa textilis =

Species of moth

Naxa textilis is a species of moth which was described by Preyer 1884. Naxa textilis included in the genus Naxa and Geometer moth family. No subspecies are listed in the Catalogue of Life.

Life cycle

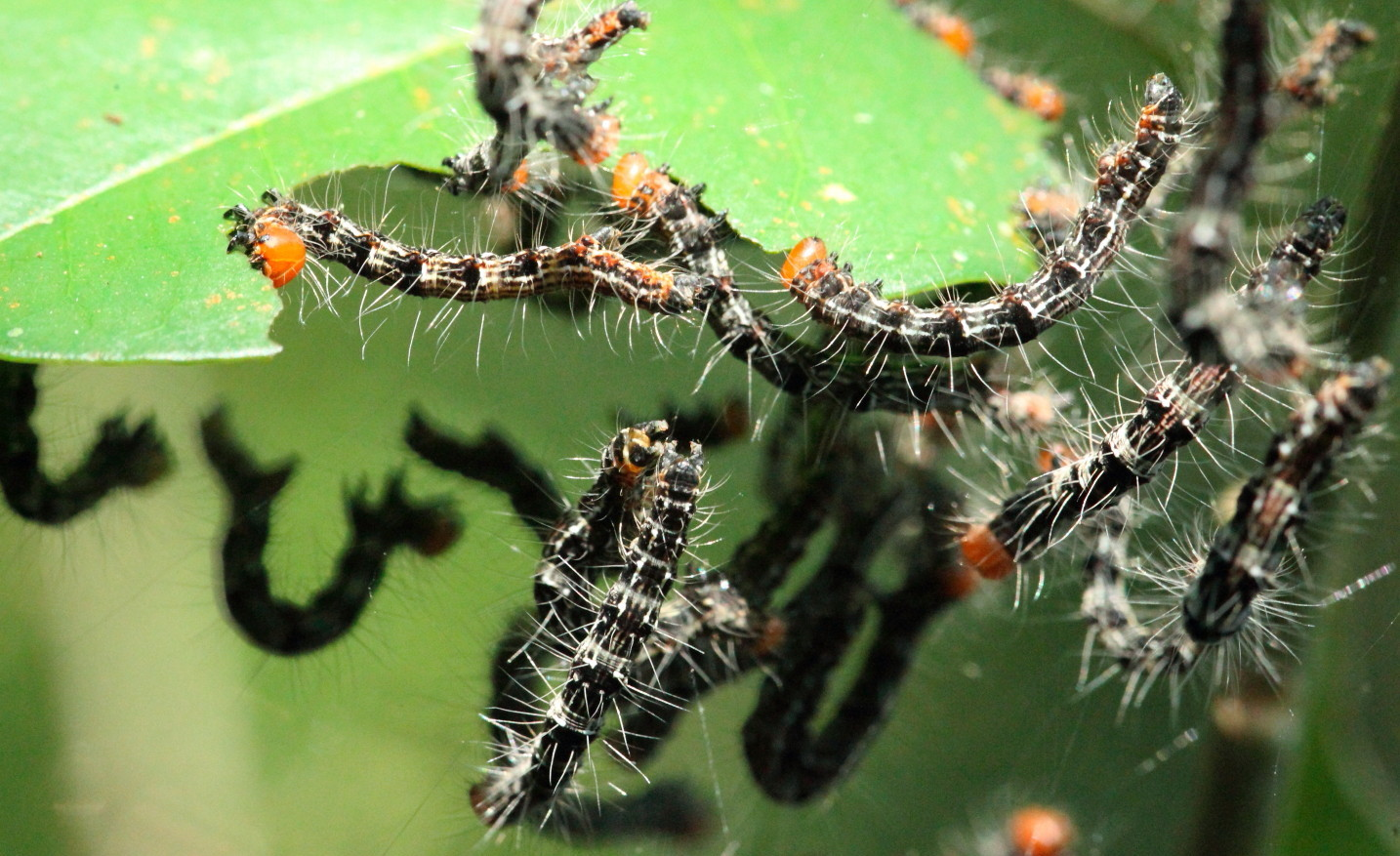
Larvae

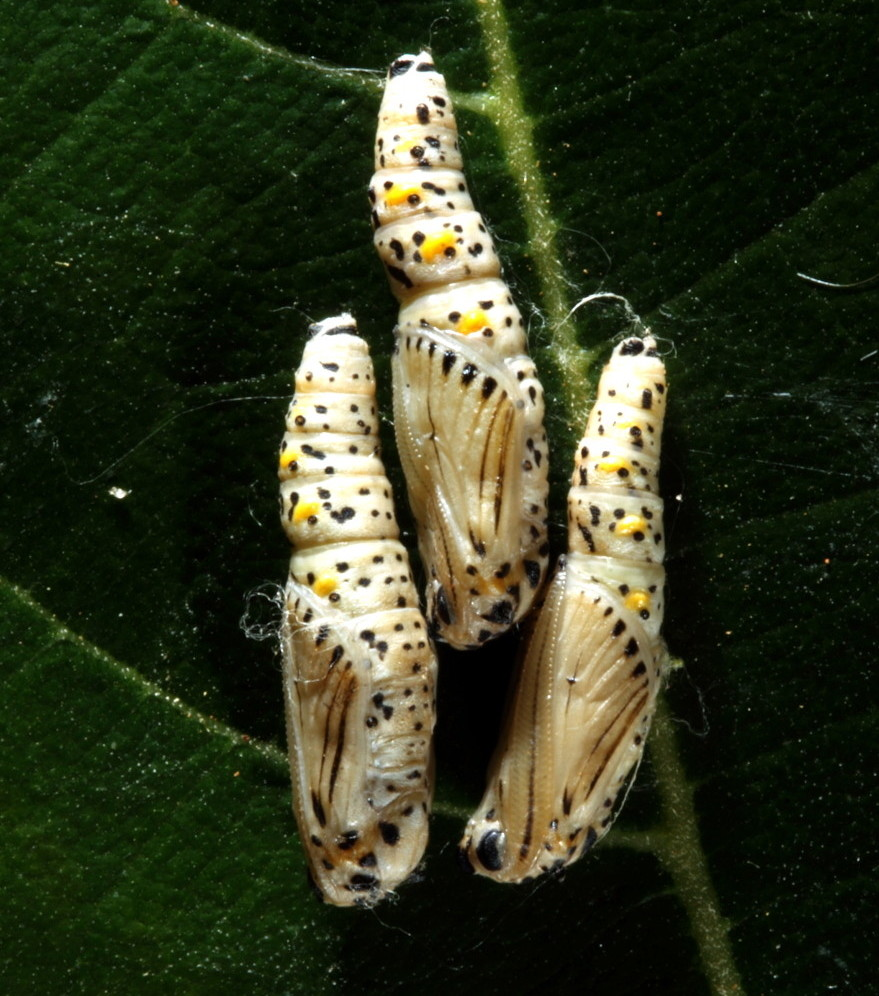
Pupae

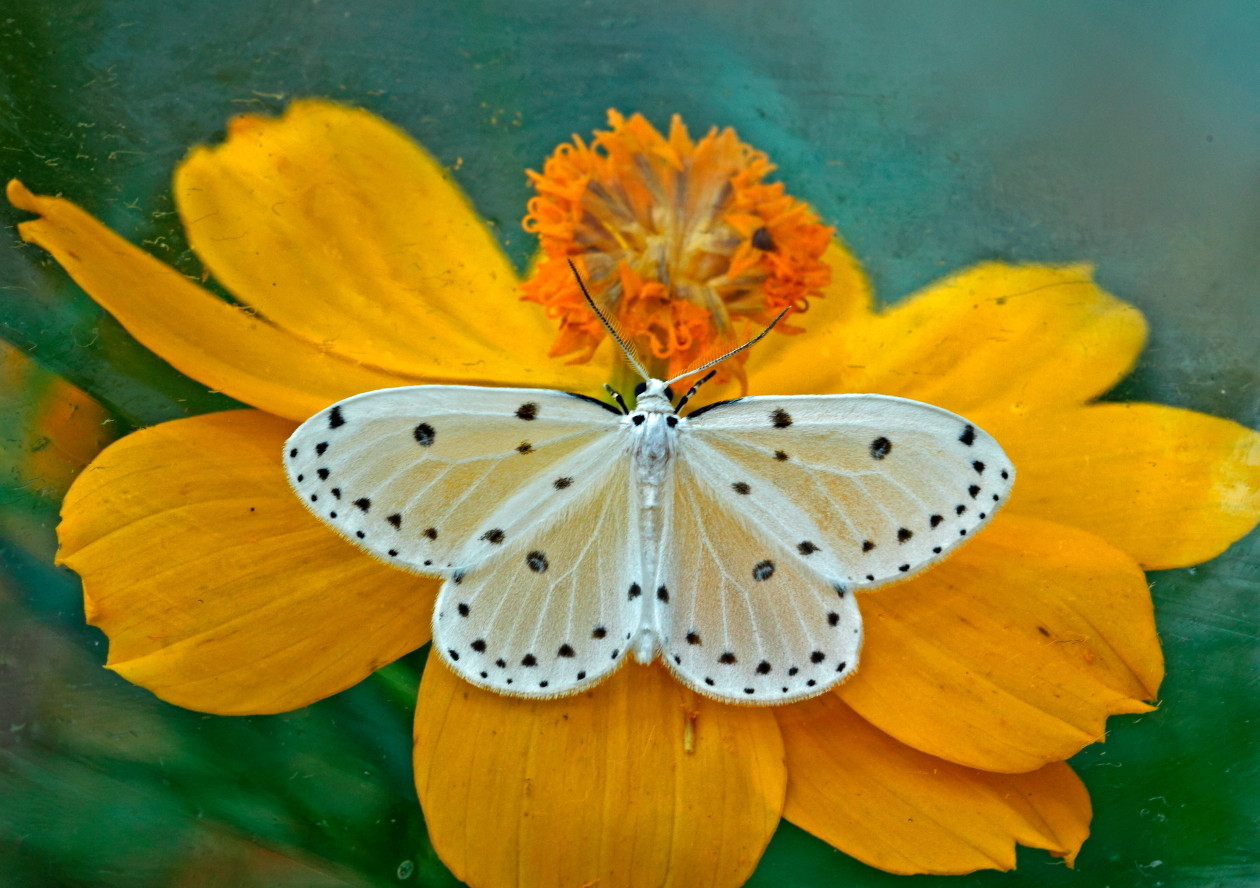
Imago
