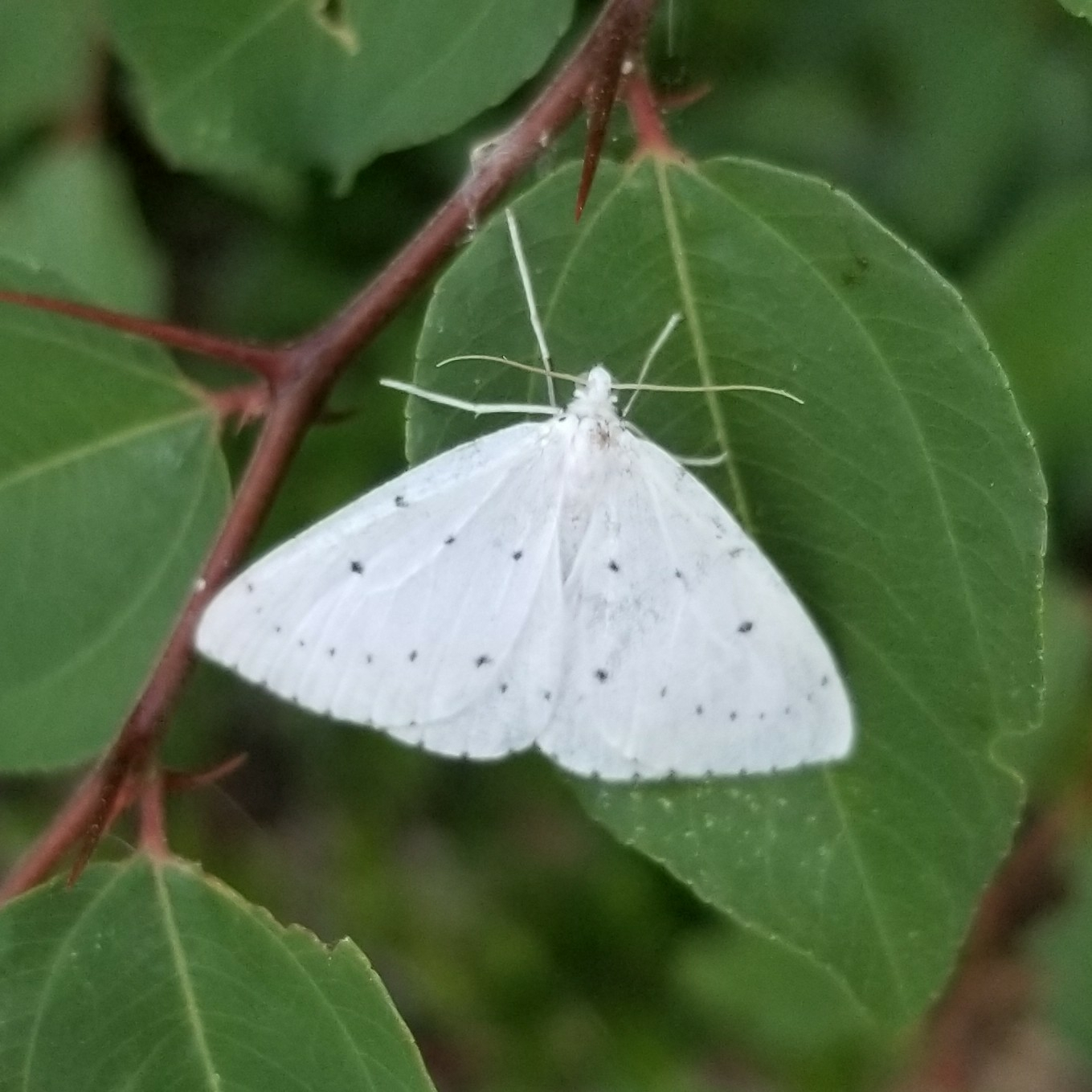
- Photo of Orthostixis Cribraria

Scientific classification
- Kingdom: Animalia
- Phylum: Arthropoda
- Clade: Pancrustacea
- Class: Insecta
- Order: Lepidoptera
- Family: Geometridae
- Subfamily: Orthostixinae; Meyrick, 1892

= Orthostixinae =

Subfamily of moths

Orthostixinae is a subfamily of the moth family Geometridae. It was described by Edward Meyrick in 1892.

== Genera ==
- Centronaxa Prout, 1910
- Naxa Walker, 1856
- Orthostixis Hübner, 1823
