= Orthostixis =

Scientific classification
- Domain: Eukaryota
- Kingdom: Animalia
- Phylum: Arthropoda
- Class: Insecta
- Order: Lepidoptera
- Family: Geometridae
- Subfamily: Orthostixinae
- Genus: Orthostixis

Genus of moths

Orthostixis is a genus of moths in the family Geometridae.
