= Centronaxa =

Scientific classification
- Domain: Eukaryota
- Kingdom: Animalia
- Phylum: Arthropoda
- Class: Insecta
- Order: Lepidoptera
- Family: Geometridae
- Subfamily: Orthostixinae
- Genus: Centronaxa

Genus of moths

Centronaxa is a genus of moths in the family Geometridae.
