= List of Larentiinae genera =

The subfamily Larentiinae of the moth family Geometridae contains the following genera:

== Tribe Asthenini ==
- Agnibesa
- Anydrelia
- Asthena
- Asthenotricha
- Bihastina
- Epicyme
- Eschatarchia
- Euchoeca
- Hastina
- Hydrelia
- Leucoctenorrhoe
- Macrohastina
- Nomenia
- Palpoctenidia
- Parasthena
- Poecilasthena
- Polynesia
- Venusia

== Tribe Cataclysmiini ==
- Cataclysme
- Phibalapteryx

== Tribe Chesiadini ==
- Amygdaloptera
- Aplocera
- Carsia
- Chesias
- Chesistege
- Docirava
- Lithostege
- Odezia
- Schistostege

== Tribe Cidariini ==
- Almeria
- Antepirrhoe
- Callabraxas
- Calostigiodes
- Chloroclysta
- Cidaria
- Colostygia
- Cosmorhoe
- Costicoma
- Diathera
- Dysstroma
- Ecliptopera
- Electrophaes
- Eulithis
- Eustroma
- Evecliptopera
- Fascilunaria
- Gandaritis
- Heterothera
- Hysterura
- Lampropteryx
- Lobogonodes
- Nebula
- Paradysstroma
- Pennithera
- Plemyria
- Pljushtchia
- Polythrena
- Praethera
- Pseudodysstroma
- Sibatania
- Thera
- Trichobaptria
- Trichodezia
- Xenortholitha

== Tribe Eudulini ==
- Eubaphe
- Eudule
- Eudulophasia

== Tribe Eupitheciini ==
- Aepylopha
- Antimimistis
- Chloroclystis
- Collix
- Eupithecia
- Gymnoscelis
- Microdes
- Micrulia
- Nasusina
- Prorella
- Symmimetis

== Tribe Hydriomenini ==
- Anachloris
- Anomocentris
- Aponotoreas
- Hydriomena
- Melitulias
- Notoreas

== Tribe Larentiini ==
- Anticlea
- Antilurga
- Entephria
- Ennada
- Herbulotina
- Idiotephria
- Kuldscha
- Kyrtolitha
- Larentia
- Mesoleuca
- Neotephria
- Pelurga
- Photoscotosia
- Plesioscotosia
- Pseudentephria
- Spargania

== Tribe Melanthiini ==
- Anticollix
- Bundelia
- Coenocalpe
- Echthrocollix
- Herbulotia
- Horisme
- Kauria
- Melanthia
- Zola

== Tribe Operophterini ==
- Epirrita
- Malacodea
- Operophtera
- Tescalsia

== Tribe Perizomini ==
- Mesotype
- Perizoma
- Pseudobaptria

== Tribe Phileremini ==
- Philereme

== Tribe Rheumapterini ==
- Hospitalia
- Pareulype
- Rheumaptera
- Triphosa

== Tribe Solitaneini ==
- Baptria
- Povilasia
- Solitanea

== Tribe Stamnodini ==
- Heterusia
- Stamnoctenis
- Stamnodes

== Tribe Trichopterygini ==
- Acasis
- Brabira
- Carige
- Celonoptera
- Cladara
- Epilobophora
- Episauris
- Episteira
- Esakiopteryx
- Heterophleps
- Leptostegna
- Lobophora
- Nothocasis
- Ortholithoidia
- Oulobophora
- Pterapherapteryx
- Ptygmatophora
- Sauris
- Trichopteryx
- Tyloptera
- Tympanota

== Tribe Xanthorhoini ==
- Acodia
- Austrocidaria
- Camptogramma
- Catarhoe
- Chrysolarentia
- Costaconvexa
- Disclisioprocta
- Enchoria
- Epirrhoe
- Epyaxa
- Euphyia
- Glaucorhoe
- Herreshoffia
- Juxtephria
- Loxofidonia
- Orthonama
- Protorhoe
- Psychophora
- Scotopteryx
- Xanthorhoe
- Zenophleps

== Incertae sedis ==
- Acolutha
- Actinoloba
- Aeschrostoma
- Aloba
- Amnesicoma
- Anemplocia
- Anisomelia
- Anomozela
- Ansorgia
- Anthalma
- Aperusia
- Apithecia
- Apleria
- Apodroma
- Aposteira
- Archirhoe
- Arctesthes
- Asaphodes
- Atopophysa
- Baynia
- Bombia
- Brabirodes
- Butleriana

== Not sorted yet ==
- Caledasthena
- Calleulype
- Callipia
- Calluga
- Callygris
- Camelopteryx
- Carbia
- Carptima
- Cephalissa
- Ceratodalia
- Chaetolopha
- Chalinophrura
- Chalyboclydon
- Chartographa
- Chionopora
- Chlorotimandra
- Chrioloba
- Chrismopteryx
- Christophiella
- Chrysoclystis
- Cirrhorheuma
- Cirrolygris
- Cleptocosmia
- Coenolarentia
- Coenotephria
- Conchylia
- Cophocerotis
- Crocypus
- Cryptoloba
- Ctenaulis
- Cyclica
- Cysteopteryx
- Dasysternica
- Dasyuris
- Deinoptila
- Desmoclystia
- Dineurodes
- Diplochroa
- Dissolophodes
- Distoneura
- Dolerosceles
- Dysethia
- Dysethiodes
- Dyspteris
- Dysrhoe
- Dystypoptila
- Earophila
- Eccymatoge
- Ecnomophlebia
- Ecpetala
- Ecphysis
- Ellipostoma
- Elvia
- Emmesomia
- Eoa
- Eoasthena
- Eois
- Epimacaria
- Epiphryne
- Erateina
- Erebochlora
- Eremodorea
- Ersephila
- Eubolia
- Eurhinosea
- Eutrepsia
- Euzimmermania
- Eva
- Exodezia
- Fletcherana
- Forbachia
- Fueguina
- Gela
- Glaucopteryx
- Gnamptopteryx
- Gonanticlea
- Goniopteroloba
- Grammochesias
- Grammorhoe
- Graphidipus
- Grossbeckia
- Gypsochroa
- Hagnagora
- Hammaptera
- Haplolabida
- Haplopteryx
- Heterochasta
- Homodotis
- Hoplolygris
- Hoplosauris
- Hybridoneura
- Hymenodria
- Hypenorhynchus
- Hypocometa
- Hypycnopa
- Iramba
- Isodiscodes
- Isoloba
- Isosauris
- Kauaiina
- Laciniodes
- Lagynopteryx
- Larentia
- Lasioedma
- Lasiogma
- Leiocera
- Lepiodes
- Lobidiopteryx
- Lobogonia
- Lobophorodes
- Lygranoa
- Malgassorhoe
- Mariaba
- Marmopteryx
- Megaloba
- Megalotica
- Mennis
- Microcalcarifera
- Micromia
- Mimoclystia
- Mimomanes
- Minoa
- Monarcha
- Monostoecha
- Nannia
- Naxidia
- Neochesias
- Neopachrophilla
- Neoscelidia
- Notholoba
- Nothoporinia
- Nyctobia
- Obila
- Ochodontia
- Oenotrus
- Oesymna
- Oligopleura
- Onagrodes
- Opistheploce
- Oporinia
- Oreonoma
- Orthoclydon
- Otoplecta
- Otucha
- Pachrophylla
- Palaeomystis
- Papuanticlea
- Paradetis
- Paragramma
- Paralobophora
- Paralygris
- Paramathia
- Parapachrophylla
- Parapalta
- Paraptera
- Parazoma
- Pardodes
- Pareustroma
- Parodontorhoe
- Paromala
- Parortholitha
- Phacelophora
- Philopsia
- Phlebosphales
- Phoenissa
- Phthonoloba
- Physetobasis
- Physoloba
- Piercia
- Plemyriopsis
- Pocophora
- Polyclysta
- Polystroma
- Pomasia
- Praeapodroma
- Priapodes
- Probolaea
- Progonostola
- Proomphe
- Propithex
- Prorocorys
- Prosthetopteryx
- Protaulaca
- Protonebula
- Protosteira
- Psaliodes
- Pseudaria
- Pseudeuchlora
- Pseudochesias
- Pseudolarentia
- Pseudomennis
- Pseudomimetis
- Pseudopsodos
- Pseudosauris
- Psilopora
- Pterocypha
- Ptychorrhoe
- Remodes
- Rhinura
- Rhopalista
- Rhopalodes
- Sarobeia
- Sarracena
- Scelidacantha
- Scordonia
- Scordylia
- Scordyliodes
- Scotocyma
- Smileuma
- Spectrobasis
- Speluncaris
- Spiloctenia
- Stathmonyma
- Steganolophia
- Steirophora
- Stenista
- Sterrhochaeta
- Synneurodes
- Synpelurga
- Syzeuxis
- Syzyx
- Talledega
- Tamurhydrelia
- Tatosoma
- Telenomeuta
- Terenodes
- Toxopaltes
- Trichoplites
- Trichopterigia
- Trichorrhages
- Trichozoma
- Trimetopia
- Tripteridia
- Triptila
- Triptiloides
- Trocherateina
- Trochiodes
- Trotocalpe
- Urocalpe
- Urolophia
- Viidaleppia
- Xenoclystia
- Xenospora
- Zacualpania
- Ziridava
