= Eois reducta =

Scientific classification
- Kingdom: Animalia
- Phylum: Arthropoda
- Clade: Pancrustacea
- Class: Insecta
- Order: Lepidoptera
- Family: Geometridae
- Genus: Eois
- Species: E. reducta

Binomial name
- Eois reducta Herbulot, 1988

Species of moth

Eois reducta is a moth in the family Geometridae, meaning its larva moves around in a looping manner. Further contextualizing the species, it belongs to the subfamily Larentiinae. This particular species of moth can be found in Cameroon.
