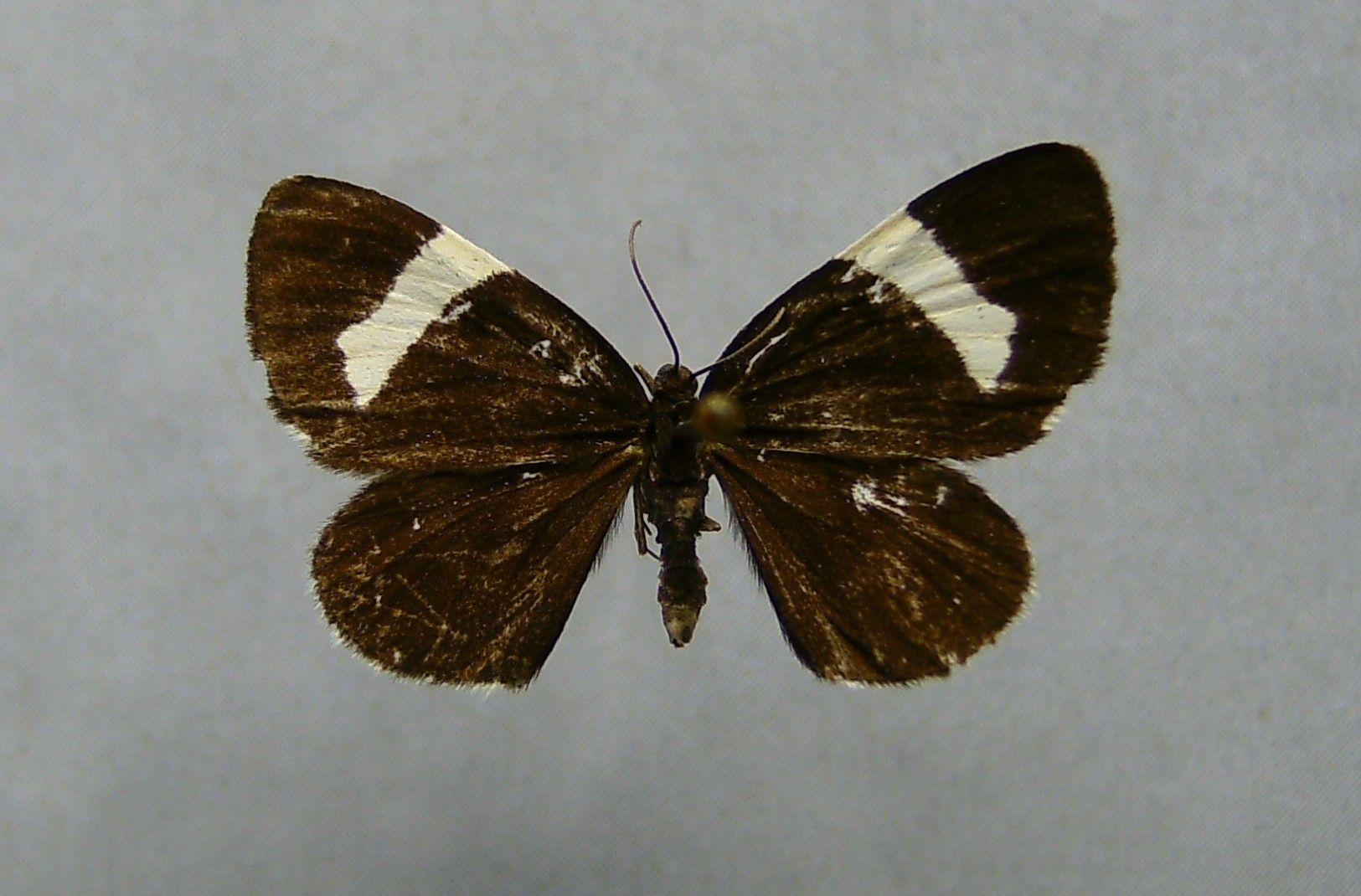
- Baptria tibiale

Scientific classification
- Kingdom: Animalia
- Phylum: Arthropoda
- Class: Insecta
- Order: Lepidoptera
- Family: Geometridae
- Subfamily: Larentiinae
- Tribe: Solitaneini

= Solitaneini =

Tribe of moths

Solitaneini is a tribe of geometer moths under subfamily Larentiinae.

== Genera ==
- Baptria Hübner, 1825
- Povilasia Viidalepp, 1986
- Solitanea Djakonov, 1924
