= Dineurodes =

Scientific classification
- Kingdom: Animalia
- Phylum: Arthropoda
- Clade: Pancrustacea
- Class: Insecta
- Order: Lepidoptera
- Family: Geometridae
- Genus: Dineurodes

Genus of moths

Dineurodes is a genus of moths in the family Geometridae, Subfamily Larentiinae. OLIGOPLEURA Herrich-Schäffer, [1855] is also a valid name.
