= Aloba =

Scientific classification
- Kingdom: Animalia
- Phylum: Arthropoda
- Class: Insecta
- Order: Lepidoptera
- Family: Geometridae
- Subfamily: Larentiinae
- Genus: Aloba; Warren, 1895
- Species: A. cinereus

Binomial name
- Aloba cinereus (Bartlett-Calvert, 1893)

Monotypic genus of geometer moths

Aloba is a monotypic moth genus in the family Geometridae described by Warren in 1895. Its only species, Aloba cinereus, was first described by William Bartlett-Calvert in 1893. It is found in the Araucanía Region of Chile.
