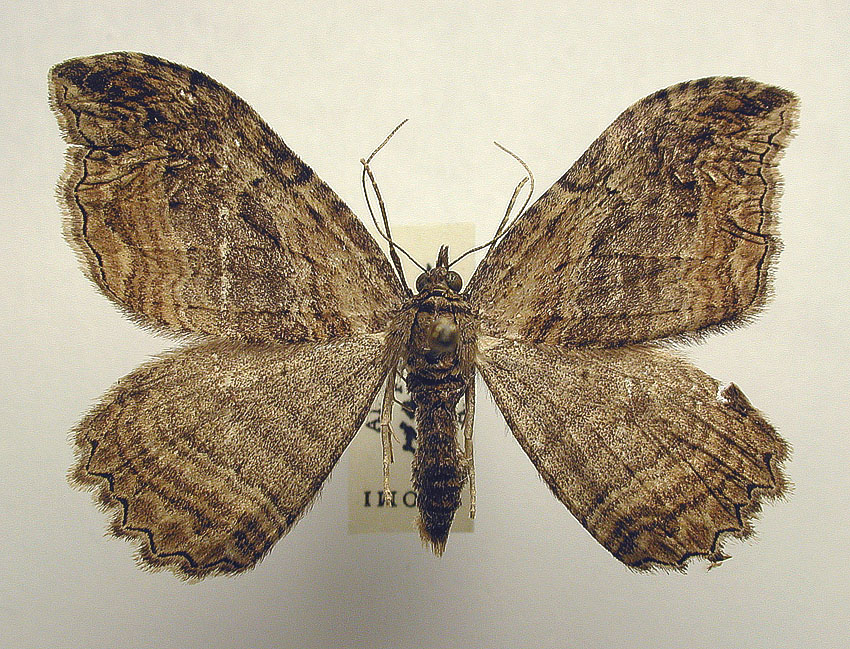

Scientific classification
- Kingdom: Animalia
- Phylum: Arthropoda
- Clade: Pancrustacea
- Class: Insecta
- Order: Lepidoptera
- Family: Geometridae
- Genus: Philereme
- Species: P. transversata

Binomial name
- Philereme transversata (Hufnagel, 1767)

Synonyms
- Phalaena transversata Hufnagel, 1767; Philereme britannica Lempke, 1968; Geometra rhamnata Denis & Schiffermuller, 1775; Scotosia terror Schawerda, 1914

= Philereme transversata =

Species of moth

Philereme transversata, the dark umber, is a moth of the family Geometridae. It is found in much of the Palearctic realm.

The wingspan is 29–37 mm. Variable in colour but generally very constant in markings, forewing with all the lines sharply angulated near the costa, the postmedian with an unusually long, double projection at the first radial. The ground-colour is bright ochreous brown or dark brown, the lines darker, the median band sometimes almost dissolved into lines but oftener more or less solid, at times quite blackish. — ab. hastedonensis Lamhill. is a melanotic form in which the brown ground-colour of the type form is in a large measure replaced by blackish. Described from Belgium, but occurs also near London. — japanaria Leech is lighter, with the median area of the forewing not or not appreciably darkened. Oiwake, Japan.

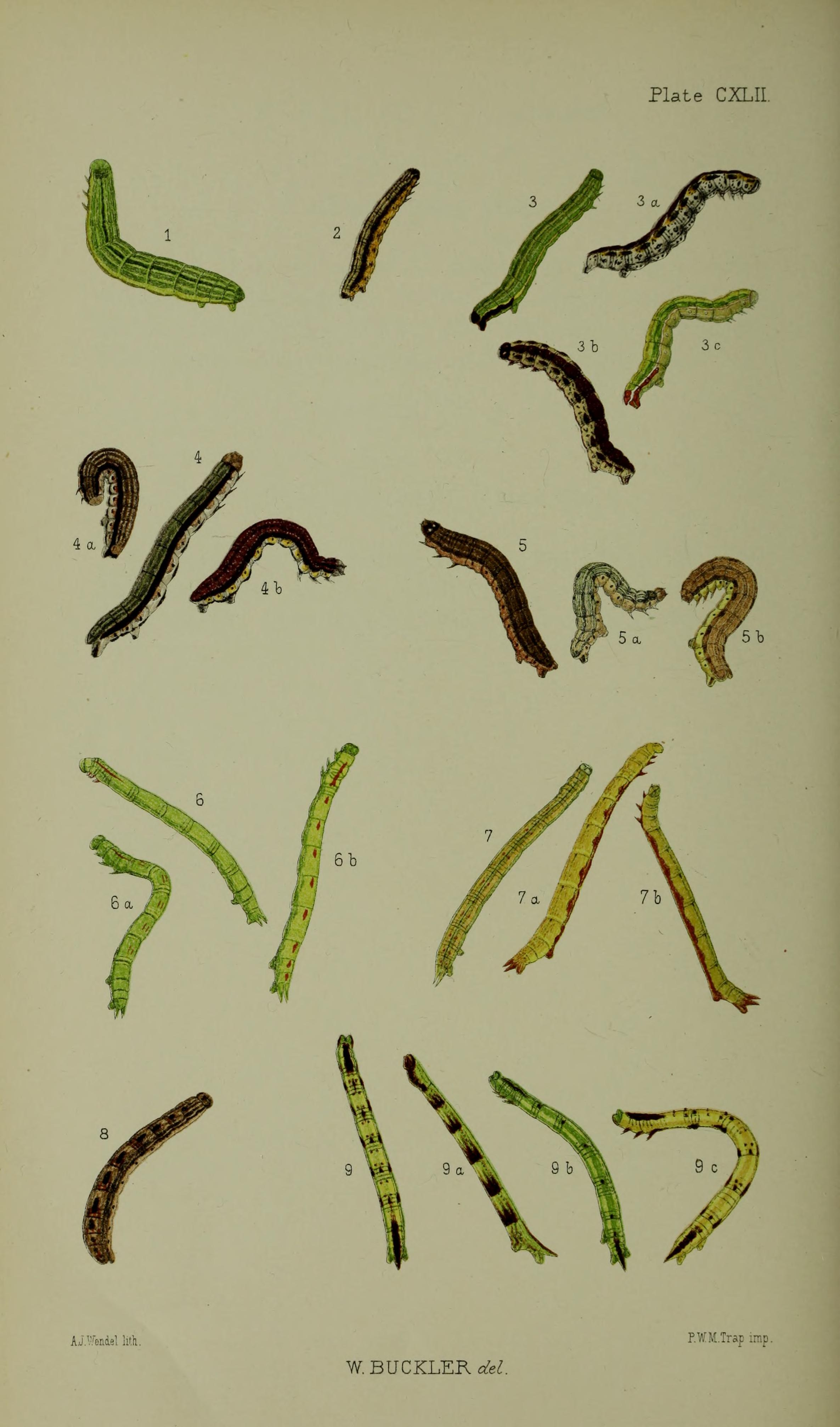
Figs 3, 3a, 3b, 3c larvae after final moult

There is one generation per year with adults on wing from the beginning of June to August.

The larvae feed on buckthorn (Rhamnus cathartica). The larvae can be found from the end of April to June. The caterpillar has two forms, one pale green and the other dark brown and cream. It overwinters as an egg.
