= Butleriana =

Scientific classification
- Kingdom: Animalia
- Phylum: Arthropoda
- Clade: Pancrustacea
- Class: Insecta
- Order: Lepidoptera
- Family: Geometridae
- Subfamily: Larentiinae
- Genus: Butleriana; Parra, 1991

Genus of moths

Butleriana is a genus of moths in the family Geometridae described by Luis E. Parra in 1991.

== Species ==
- Butleriana minor Butler, 1882
- Butleriana fasciata Butler, 1882
- Butleriana fumosa Butler, 1882
- Butleriana oculata Mabille, 1885
