= Syzeuxis =

Scientific classification
- Kingdom: Animalia
- Phylum: Arthropoda
- Class: Insecta
- Order: Lepidoptera
- Family: Geometridae
- Subfamily: Larentiinae
- Genus: Syzeuxis; Hampson, 1895

Synonyms
- Aphantoloba Warren, 1896

Genus of moths

Syzeuxis is a genus of moths in the family Geometridae erected by George Hampson in 1895.

== Species ==
- Syzeuxis heteromeces Prout, 1926
- Syzeuxis magnidica Prout, 1926
- Syzeuxis nigrinotata Warren, 1896
- Syzeuxis seminanis Prout, 1926
- Syzeuxis subfasciaria Wehrli, 1924
- Syzeuxis tessellifimbria Prout, 1926
- Syzeuxis trinotaria Moore, 1868
