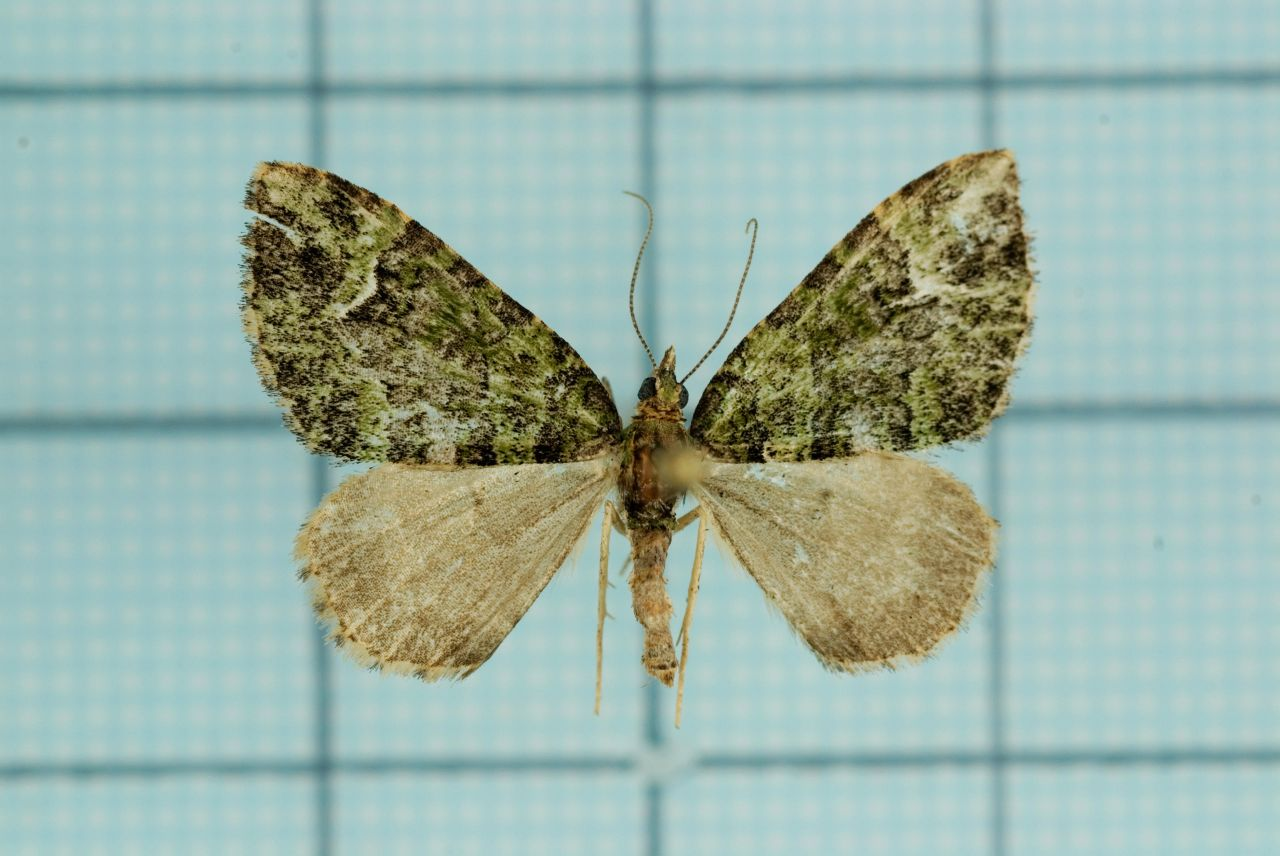
- Apithecia viridata wilemani

Scientific classification
- Kingdom: Animalia
- Phylum: Arthropoda
- Clade: Pancrustacea
- Class: Insecta
- Order: Lepidoptera
- Family: Geometridae
- Subfamily: Larentiinae
- Genus: Apithecia; Prout, 1914
- Species: A. viridata

Binomial name
- Apithecia viridata (Moore, 1868)

Synonyms
- Cidaria viridata Moore, 1868; Apithecia reliquifascia Prout, 1926; Apithecia wilemani Prout, 1931

= Apithecia =

Monotypic genus of geometer moths

Apithecia is a monotypic moth genus in the family Geometridae described by Prout in 1914. Its only species, Apithecia viridata, described by Frederic Moore in 1868, is found in India, Nepal, Bhutan, China and Taiwan.

== Subspecies ==
Subspecies include:

- Apithecia viridata viridata
- Apithecia viridata wilemani Prout, 1931 (Taiwan)
- Apithecia viridata reliquifascia Prout, 1926
