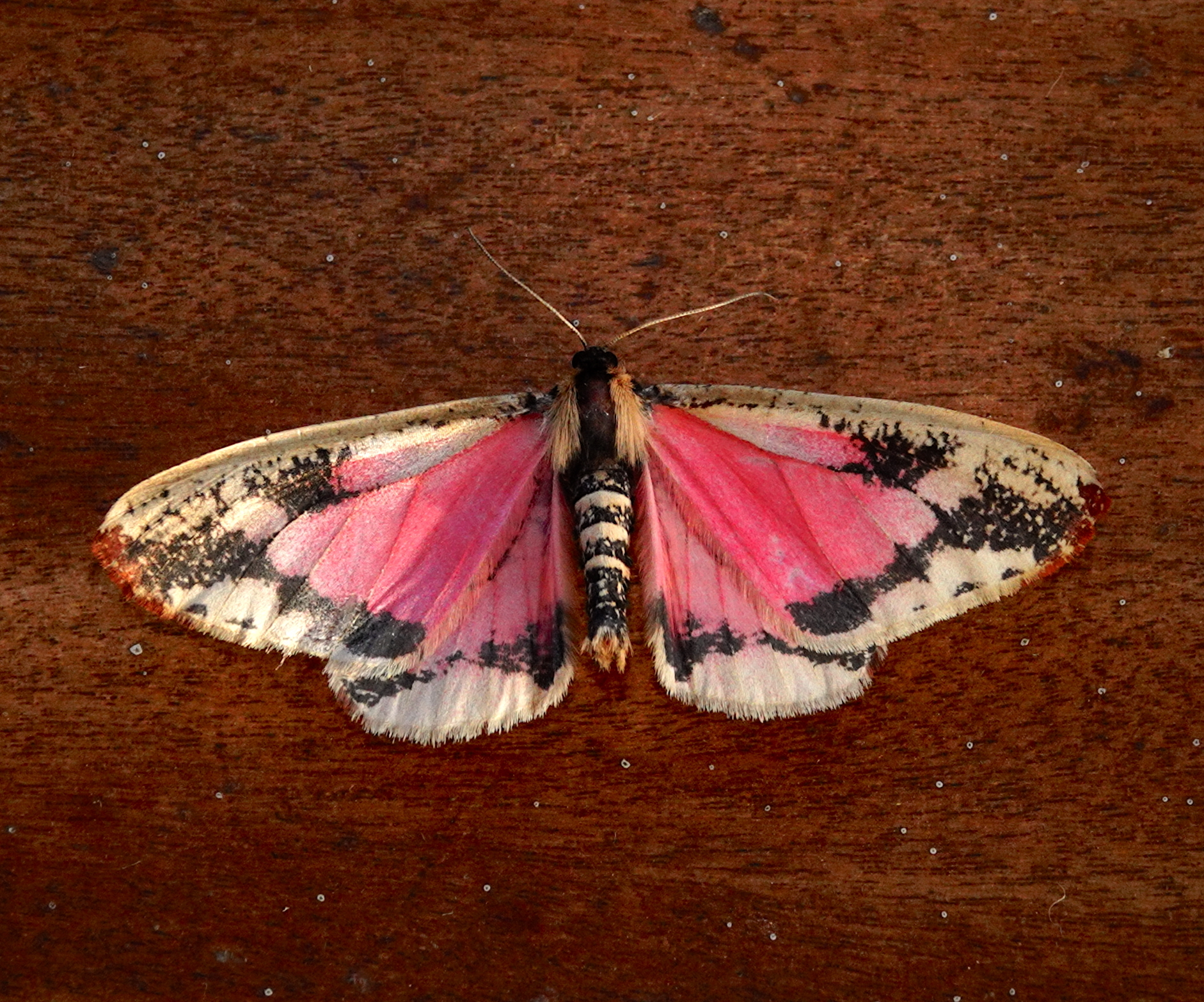
- Callipia karsholti

Scientific classification
- Kingdom: Animalia
- Phylum: Arthropoda
- Class: Insecta
- Order: Lepidoptera
- Family: Geometridae
- Subfamily: Larentiinae
- Genus: Callipia; Guenée, 1858

= Callipia =

Genus of moths

Callipia is a genus of moths in the family Geometridae, first described by Achille Guenée in 1858.

== Species ==
Callipia contains the following species:

- Callipia anthocharidaria (Oberthür, 1881)
- Callipia augustae Brehm, 2018
- Callipia aurata Warren, 1904
- Callipia balteata Warren, 1905
- Callipia brenemanae Sperry, 1951
- Callipia constantinaria Oberthür, 1881
- Callipia fiedleri Brehm, 2018
- Callipia flagrans Warren, 1904
- Callipia fulvida Warren, 1907
- Callipia hausmanni Brehm, 2018
- Callipia hiltae Brehm, 2018
- Callipia intermedia Dognin, 1914
- Callipia jakobi Brehm, 2018
- Callipia jonai Brehm, 2018
- Callipia karsholti Brehm, 2018
- Callipia lamasi Brehm, 2018
- Callipia languescens Warren, 1904
- Callipia levequei Brehm, 2018
- Callipia milleri Brehm, 2018
- Callipia occulta Warren, 1904
- Callipia paradisea Thierry-Mieg, 1904
- Callipia parrhasiata Guenée, 1858
- Callipia rosetta Thierry-Mieg, 1904
- Callipia rougeriei Brehm, 2018
- Callipia sihvoneni Brehm, 2018
- Callipia vicinaria Dognin, 1913
- Callipia walterfriedlii Brehm, 2018
- Callipia wojtusiaki Brehm, 2018
