= Cirrolygris =

Scientific classification
- Kingdom: Animalia
- Phylum: Arthropoda
- Class: Insecta
- Order: Lepidoptera
- Family: Geometridae
- Subfamily: Larentiinae
- Genus: Cirrolygris; Warren, 1895
- Species: C. momaria

Binomial name
- Cirrolygris momaria (Snellen, 1874)

Genus of moths

Cirrolygris is a monotypic moth genus in the family Geometridae first described by Warren in 1895. Its only species, Cirrolygris momaria, was first described by Snellen in 1874. It is found in Colombia.
