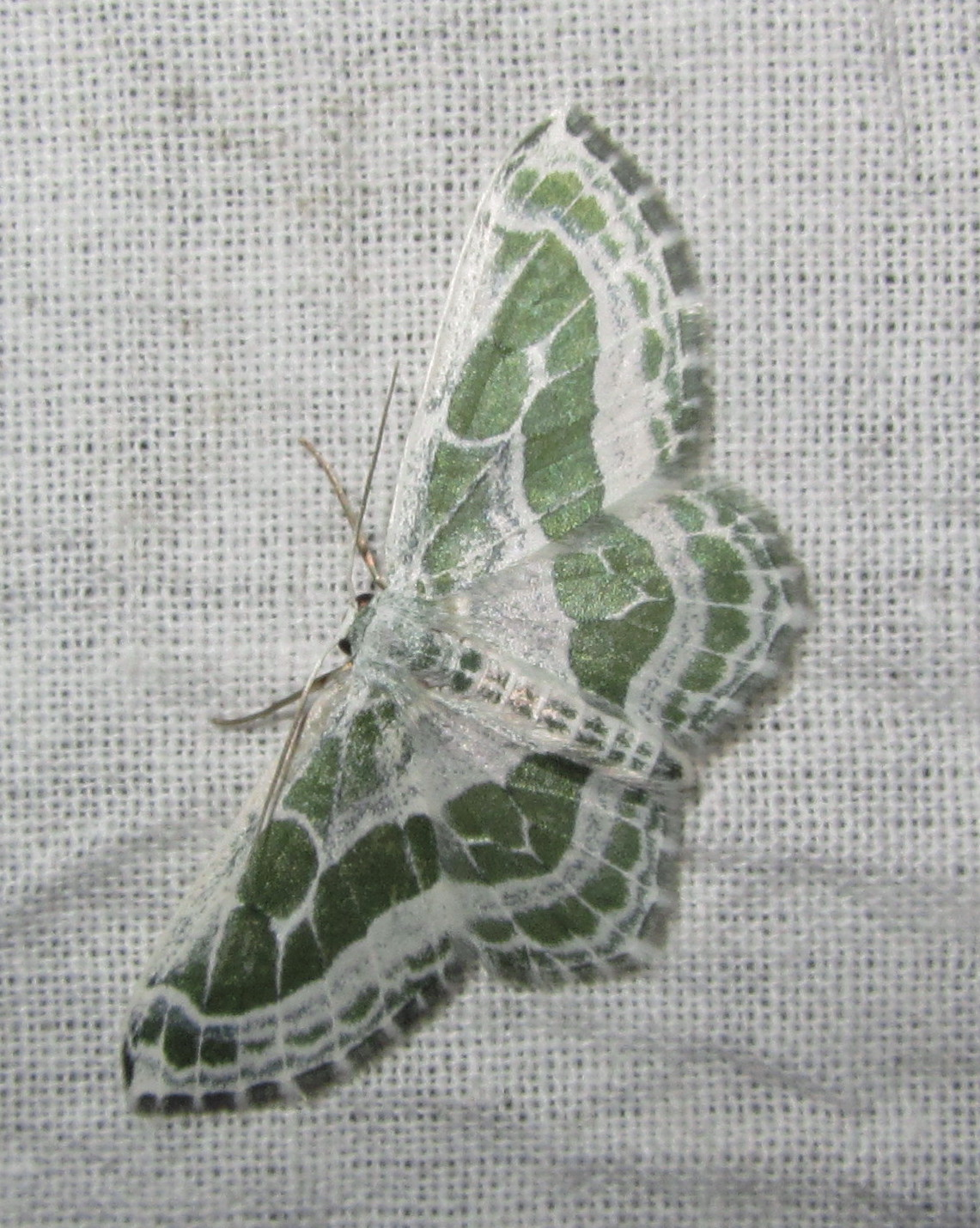
- Pseudeuchlora kafebera

Scientific classification
- Kingdom: Animalia
- Phylum: Arthropoda
- Class: Insecta
- Order: Lepidoptera
- Family: Geometridae
- Subfamily: Larentiinae
- Genus: Pseudeuchlora; Hampson, 1895
- Species: P. kafebera

Binomial name
- Pseudeuchlora kafebera (C. Swinhoe, 1894)

Synonyms
- Eucrostes kafebera C. Swinhoe, 1894

= Pseudeuchlora =

Genus of moths

Pseudeuchlora is a monotypic moth genus in the family Geometridae erected by George Hampson in 1895. Its only species, Pseudeuchlora kafebera, was first described by Charles Swinhoe in 1894. It is found in Asia, including India.
