= Cleptocosmia =

Scientific classification
- Kingdom: Animalia
- Phylum: Arthropoda
- Class: Insecta
- Order: Lepidoptera
- Family: Geometridae
- Subfamily: Larentiinae
- Genus: Cleptocosmia; Warren, 1896
- Species: C. mutabilis

Binomial name
- Cleptocosmia mutabilis Warren, 1896

Genus of moths

Cleptocosmia is a monotypic moth genus in the family Geometridae. Its only species, Cleptocosmia mutabilis, is found in Australia. Both the genus and species were first described by Warren in 1896.
