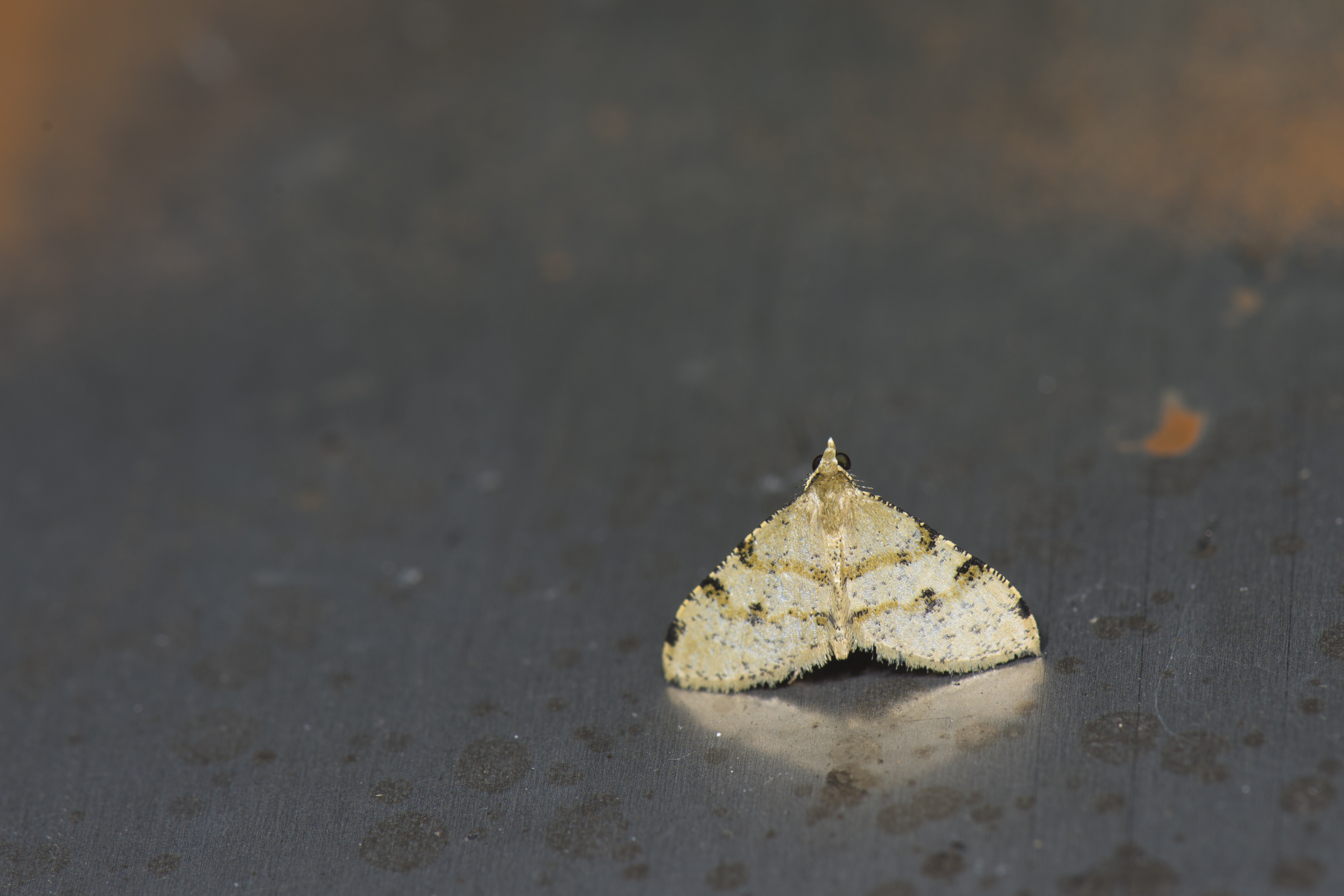
- Chrioloba costimacula

Scientific classification
- Kingdom: Animalia
- Phylum: Arthropoda
- Clade: Pancrustacea
- Class: Insecta
- Order: Lepidoptera
- Family: Geometridae
- Subfamily: Larentiinae
- Genus: Chrioloba; Prout, 1958,

= Chrioloba =

Genus of moths

Chrioloba is a genus of moth in the family Geometridae.

== Species ==
Some species of this genus are:

- Chrioloba andrewesi Prout, 1958 (from India)
- Chrioloba bifasciata (Hampson, 1891) (from India)
- Chrioloba cinerea (Butler, 1880) (from India, Taiwan)
- Chrioloba costimacula (Wileman & South, 1917) (from Taiwan)
- Chrioloba etaina Swinhoe, 1900 (from India/Taiwan)
- Chrioloba indicaria (Guerin-Meneville, 1843) (from India)
- Chrioloba inobtrusa (Wileman & South, 1917) (from Taiwan)
- Chrioloba ochraceistriga Prout, 1958 (from India)
- Chrioloba olivaria Swinhoe, 1897 (from India)
- Chrioloba olivescens Hampson, 1902 (from India)
- Chrioloba subusta Warren, 1893) (from India)
- Chrioloba trinotata Warren, 1893) (from India)
