= Aposteira =

Scientific classification
- Kingdom: Animalia
- Phylum: Arthropoda
- Clade: Pancrustacea
- Class: Insecta
- Order: Lepidoptera
- Family: Geometridae
- Subfamily: Larentiinae
- Genus: Aposteira; Prout, 1935

Monotypic genus of geometer moths

Aposteira is a monotypic moth genus in the family Geometridae. Its only species, Aposteira saurides, is found in Madagascar. Both the genus and species were first described by Prout in 1935.
