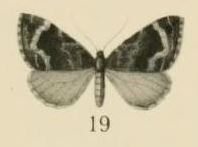

Scientific classification
- Kingdom: Animalia
- Phylum: Arthropoda
- Clade: Pancrustacea
- Class: Insecta
- Order: Lepidoptera
- Family: Geometridae
- Subfamily: Larentiinae
- Genus: Ecpetala; D. S. Fletcher, 1958

Type species
- Gonanticlea caesiplaga Prout, 1935

= Ecpetala =

Genus of moths

Ecpetala is a genus of moths in the family Geometridae. It was described by David Stephen Fletcher in 1958.
