= Amnesicoma =

Scientific classification
- Kingdom: Animalia
- Phylum: Arthropoda
- Class: Insecta
- Order: Lepidoptera
- Family: Geometridae
- Subfamily: Larentiinae
- Genus: Amnesicoma; Warren, 1895

Genus of geometer moths

Amnesicoma is a genus of moths in the family Geometridae.

== Species ==
- Amnesicoma albiseriata Warren, 1893
- Amnesicoma simplex Warren, 1895
