= Aperusia =

Scientific classification
- Kingdom: Animalia
- Phylum: Arthropoda
- Clade: Pancrustacea
- Class: Insecta
- Order: Lepidoptera
- Family: Geometridae
- Subfamily: Larentiinae
- Genus: Aperusia; Warren, 1905

Genus of geometer moths

Aperusia is a genus of moths in the family Geometridae described by Warren in 1905.

== Species ==
- Aperusia albifascia Dognin, 1918
- Aperusia punctistriata Warren, 1905
