= Ansorgia =

Scientific classification
- Kingdom: Animalia
- Phylum: Arthropoda
- Class: Insecta
- Order: Lepidoptera
- Family: Geometridae
- Subfamily: Larentiinae
- Genus: Ansorgia; Warren, 1899
- Species: A. divergens

Binomial name
- Ansorgia divergens Warren, 1899

Monotypic genus of geometer moths

Ansorgia is a monotypic moth genus in the family Geometridae. Its only species, Ansorgia divergens, is found in Uganda. Both the genus and species were described by Warren in 1899.
