= Dystypoptila =

Scientific classification
- Kingdom: Animalia
- Phylum: Arthropoda
- Class: Insecta
- Order: Lepidoptera
- Family: Geometridae
- Subfamily: Larentiinae
- Genus: Dystypoptila; Warren, 1895
- Species: D. triangularis

Binomial name
- Dystypoptila triangularis Warren, 1895

Genus of moths

Dystypoptila is a monotypic moth genus in the family Geometridae. Its only species, Dystypoptila triangularis, is found on the Indonesian island of Sumatra. Both the genus and species were first described by Warren in 1895.
