= Ecnomophlebia =

Scientific classification
- Kingdom: Animalia
- Phylum: Arthropoda
- Class: Insecta
- Order: Lepidoptera
- Family: Geometridae
- Subfamily: Larentiinae
- Genus: Ecnomophlebia; Turner, 1941
- Species: E. argyrospila

Binomial name
- Ecnomophlebia argyrospila Turner, 1941

Genus of moths

Ecnomophlebia is a monotypic moth genus in the family Geometridae. Its only species, Ecnomophlebia argyrospila, is found in Australia. Both the genus and species were described by Turner in 1941.
