= Anthalma =

Scientific classification
- Kingdom: Animalia
- Phylum: Arthropoda
- Class: Insecta
- Order: Lepidoptera
- Family: Geometridae
- Subfamily: Larentiinae
- Genus: Anthalma; Warren, 1901
- Species: A. latifasciata

Binomial name
- Anthalma latifasciata Warren, 1901

Monotypic genus of geometer moths

Anthalma is a monotypic moth genus in the family Geometridae. Its only species, Anthalma latifasciata, is found in Panama. Both the genus and species were first described by Warren in 1901.
