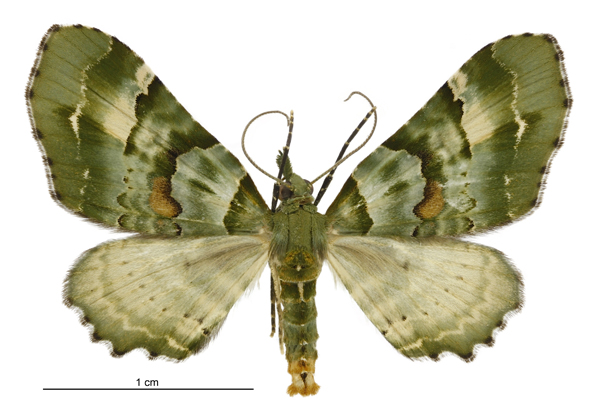
- Female
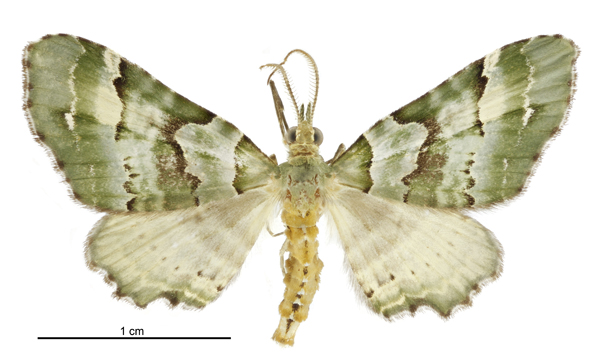
- Male

Scientific classification
- Kingdom: Animalia
- Phylum: Arthropoda
- Clade: Pancrustacea
- Class: Insecta
- Order: Lepidoptera
- Family: Geometridae
- Subfamily: Larentiinae
- Genus: Elvia; Walker, 1862
- Species: E. glaucata

Binomial name
- Elvia glaucata Walker, 1862

Synonyms
- Elvia donovani Felder & Rogenhofer, 1875

= Elvia glaucata =

Species of moth

Elvia glaucata (also known as the lawyer pug moth) is the only species in the monotypic moth genus Elvia of the family Geometridae. It is found in New Zealand. Both the genus and the species were first described by Francis Walker in 1862.
