= Gnamptopteryx =

Scientific classification
- Kingdom: Animalia
- Phylum: Arthropoda
- Class: Insecta
- Order: Lepidoptera
- Family: Geometridae
- Subfamily: Larentiinae
- Genus: Gnamptopteryx; Hampson, 1893
- Species: G. perficita

Binomial name
- Gnamptopteryx perficita Walker, 1858

Genus of moths

Gnamptopteryx is a monotypic moth genus in the family Geometridae erected by George Hampson in 1893. Its only species, Gnamptopteryx perficita, was first described by Francis Walker in 1858. It is found in India, Sri Lanka, and Taiwan.

The Taiwan population is classified as a subspecies - Gnamptopteryx perficita cymatia (Hampson, 1902).
