= Apodroma =

Scientific classification
- Kingdom: Animalia
- Phylum: Arthropoda
- Class: Insecta
- Order: Lepidoptera
- Family: Geometridae
- Subfamily: Larentiinae
- Genus: Apodroma; Warren, 1901

Genus of geometer moths

Apodroma is a genus of moths in the family Geometridae described by Warren in 1901.

== Species ==
- Apodroma subcoerulea Warren, 1901
- Apodroma quadrisectaria (Mabille, 1885)
