= Cophocerotis =

Scientific classification
- Kingdom: Animalia
- Phylum: Arthropoda
- Class: Insecta
- Order: Lepidoptera
- Family: Geometridae
- Subfamily: Larentiinae
- Genus: Cophocerotis; Warren, 1895
- Species: C. jaspeata

Binomial name
- Cophocerotis jaspeata (Dognin, 1893)

Genus of moths

Cophocerotis is a monotypic moth genus in the family Geometridae described by Warren in 1895. Its only species, Cophocerotis jaspeata, was first described by Paul Dognin in 1893. It is found in Ecuador.
