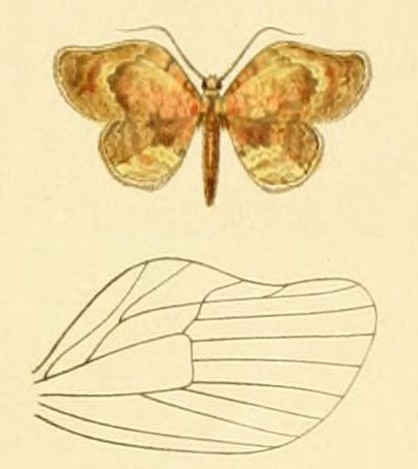

Scientific classification
- Kingdom: Animalia
- Phylum: Arthropoda
- Class: Insecta
- Order: Lepidoptera
- Family: Geometridae
- Subfamily: Larentiinae
- Genus: Camelopteryx de Joannis, 1906
- Species: C. multicolor

Binomial name
- Camelopteryx multicolor de Joannis, 1906

= Camelopteryx =

Genus of moths

Camelopteryx is a monotypic moth genus in the family Geometridae. Its only species, Camelopteryx multicolor, is found in Mauritius in the Indian Ocean. Both the genus and species were first described by Joseph de Joannis in 1906.

It was described from two specimen of variable colour. The holotype is green, red and black with a wingspan of about 20 mm, while the other specimen did not show any green colouration.
