= Anomozela =

Scientific classification
- Kingdom: Animalia
- Phylum: Arthropoda
- Class: Insecta
- Order: Lepidoptera
- Family: Geometridae
- Subfamily: Larentiinae
- Genus: Anomozela; D. S. Fletcher, 1979

Genus of geometer moths

Anomozela is a genus of moths in the family Geometridae erected by David Stephen Fletcher in 1979.
