= Caledasthena =

Scientific classification
- Kingdom: Animalia
- Phylum: Arthropoda
- Clade: Pancrustacea
- Class: Insecta
- Order: Lepidoptera
- Family: Geometridae
- Subfamily: Larentiinae
- Genus: Caledasthena; Holloway, 1979
- Species: C. montana

Binomial name
- Caledasthena montana Holloway, 1979

Genus of moths

Caledasthena is a monotypic moth genus in the family Geometridae. Its single species, Caledasthena montana, is found in New Caledonia in the south-west Pacific Ocean. Both the genus and species were first described by Jeremy Daniel Holloway in 1979.
