= Anisomelia =

Scientific classification
- Kingdom: Animalia
- Phylum: Arthropoda
- Class: Insecta
- Order: Lepidoptera
- Family: Geometridae
- Subfamily: Larentiinae
- Genus: Anisomelia; Warren, 1895

Genus of geometer moths

Anisomelia is a genus of moths in the family Geometridae described by Warren in 1895.
