= Pachrophylla =

Scientific classification
- Kingdom: Animalia
- Phylum: Arthropoda
- Class: Insecta
- Order: Lepidoptera
- Family: Geometridae
- Subfamily: Larentiinae
- Genus: Pachrophylla

Synonyms
- Bacillogaster Blanchard, 1852; Tomopteryx Philippi, 1873

Genus of moths

Pachrophylla is a genus of moths in the family Geometridae.

There are 4 species in this genus:

- Pachrophylla aorops Prout, 1926
- Pachrophylla esmerelda Butler & Salvin, 1893
- Pachrophylla linearia Blanchard, 1852
- Pachrophylla margaretae Sperry, 1954
