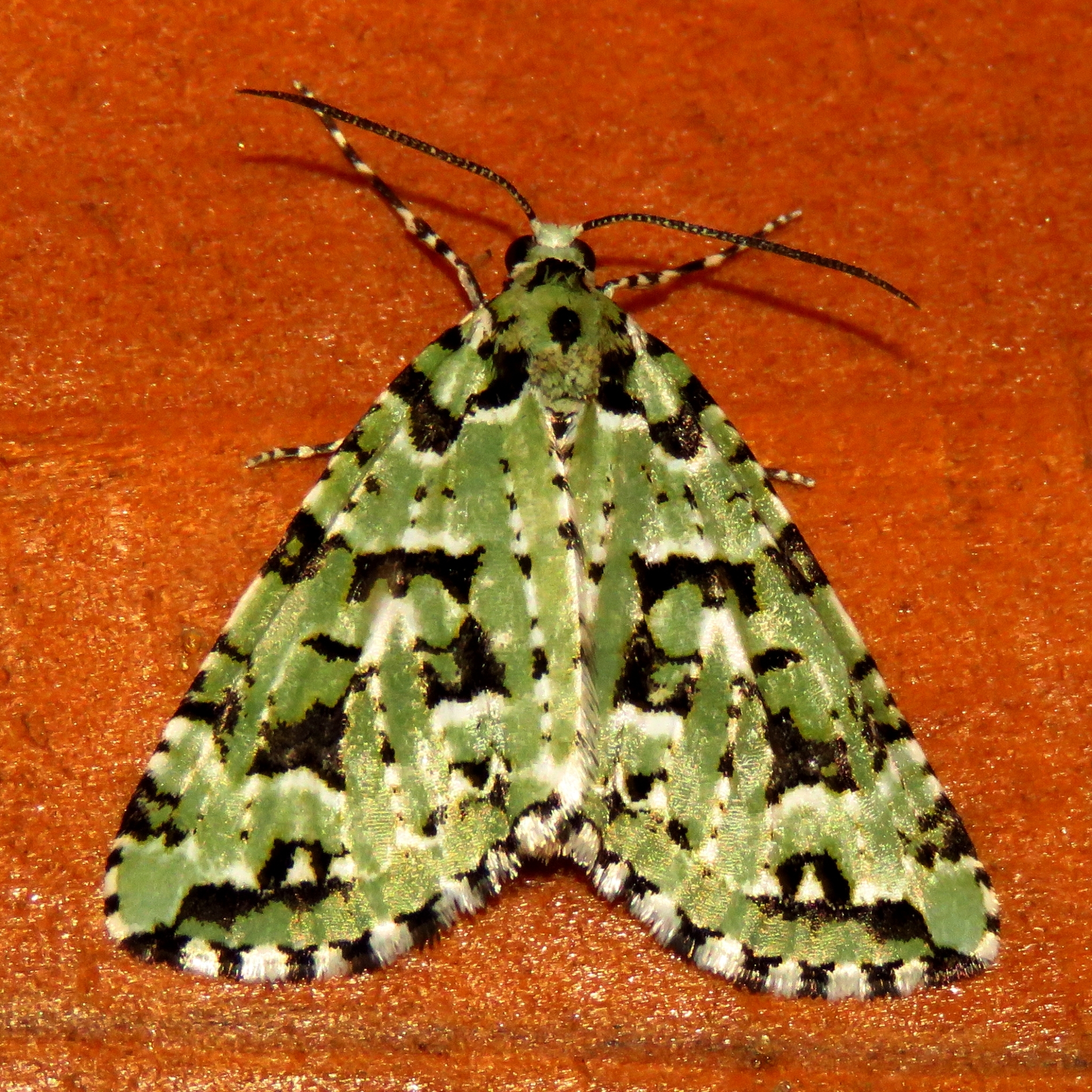
- Danielaparra fragmentata, Chile

Scientific classification
- Kingdom: Animalia
- Phylum: Arthropoda
- Class: Insecta
- Order: Lepidoptera
- Family: Geometridae
- Subfamily: Larentiinae
- Genus: Danielaparra; Kemal & Kocak, 2004

Synonyms
- Parraiella Özdikmen, 2008; Daniela Parra, 1996

= Danielaparra =

Genus of moths

Danielaparra is a genus of geometer moths in the family Geometridae. There are at least two described species in Danielaparra, both endemic to Chile.

== Species ==
These two species belong to the genus Danielaparra:

- Danielaparra fragmentata (Dognin, 1906)
- Danielaparra imbricaria (Felder & Rogenhofer, 1875)
