= Distoneura =

Scientific classification
- Kingdom: Animalia
- Phylum: Arthropoda
- Class: Insecta
- Order: Lepidoptera
- Family: Geometridae
- Subfamily: Larentiinae
- Genus: Distoneura; D. S. Fletcher, 1979
- Species: D. marmorata

Binomial name
- Distoneura marmorata (Warren, 1895)

Genus of moths

Distoneura is a monotypic moth genus in the family Geometridae described by David Stephen Fletcher in 1979. Its only species, Distoneura marmorata, was first described by Warren in 1895. It is found in Rio de Janeiro, Brazil.
