= Arrayanaria =

Scientific classification
- Kingdom: Animalia
- Phylum: Arthropoda
- Class: Insecta
- Order: Lepidoptera
- Family: Geometridae
- Subfamily: Larentiinae
- Genus: Arrayanaria; Parra, 1996

Genus of moths

Arrayanaria is a genus of moths in the family Geometridae described by Parra in 1996.

== Species ==
- Arrayanaria duofasciata Parra, 1996
- Arrayanaria santiaguensis Parra, 1996
