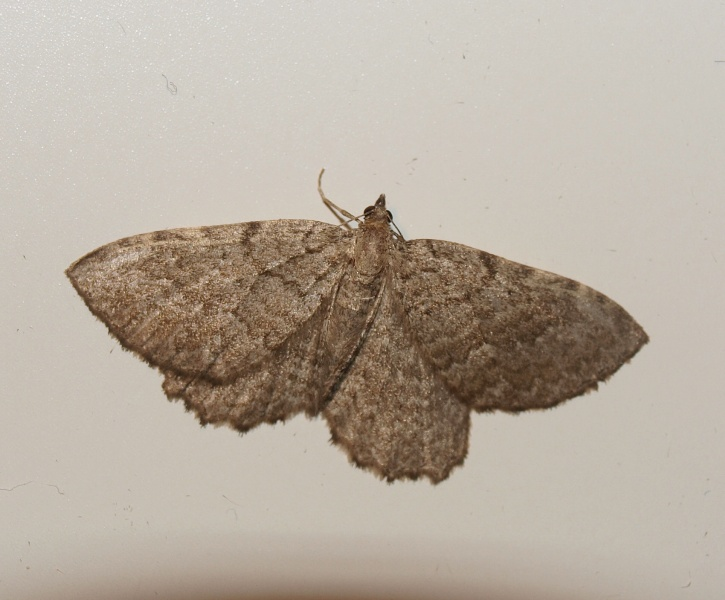

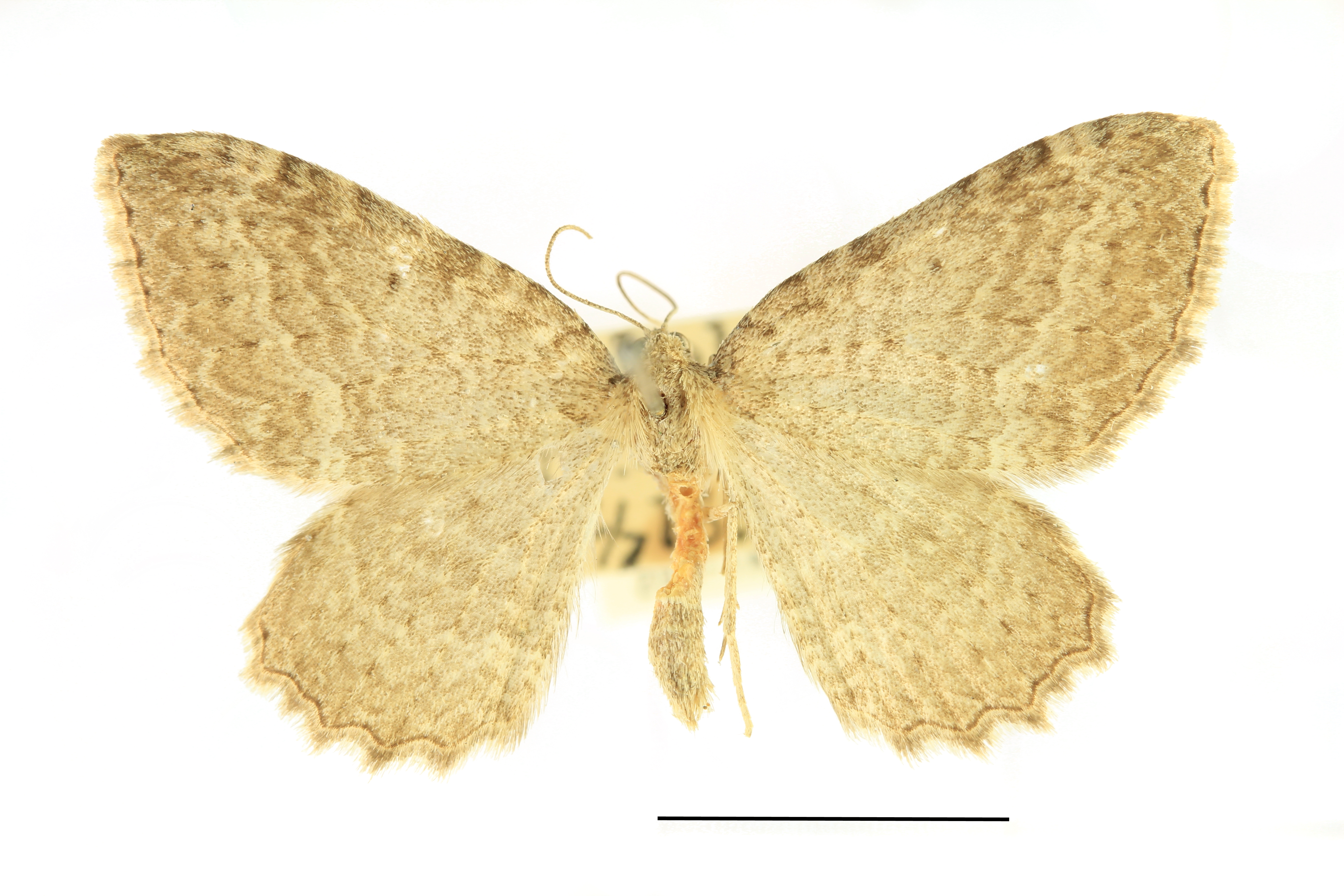

Scientific classification
- Kingdom: Animalia
- Phylum: Arthropoda
- Clade: Pancrustacea
- Class: Insecta
- Order: Lepidoptera
- Family: Geometridae
- Genus: Philereme
- Species: P. vetulata

Binomial name
- Philereme vetulata (Denis & Schiffermüller, 1775)

Synonyms
- Geometra vetulata Denis & Schiffermuller, 1775

= Philereme vetulata =

Species of moth

Philereme vetulata, the brown scallop, is a moth of the family Geometridae. It is found in much of the Palearctic realm.

The wingspan is 24–30 mm. Shiny grey-brown, both wings are traversed by numerous slightly darker wavy lines, which are angulated subcostally on the forewing; both wings with blackish discal dot above and beneath. P. vetulata generally varies very little.

There is one generation per year with adults on the wing from the end of May to August.

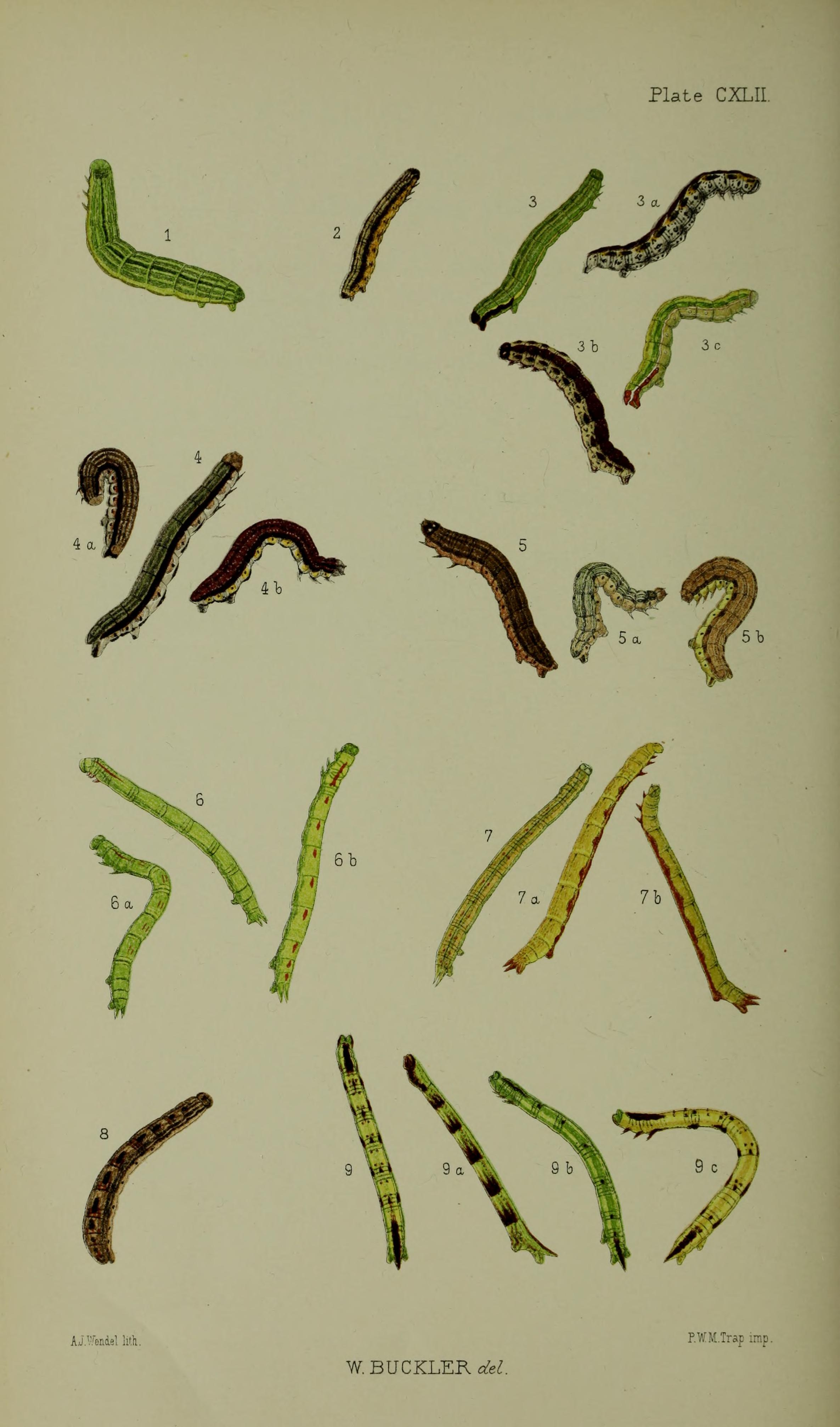
Fig 2 larvae after final moult

The larvae feed on alder buckthorn (Rhamnus frangula) and are dark grey with paler stripes and orange suffusion. They can be found from the end of April to June. It overwinters as an egg.
