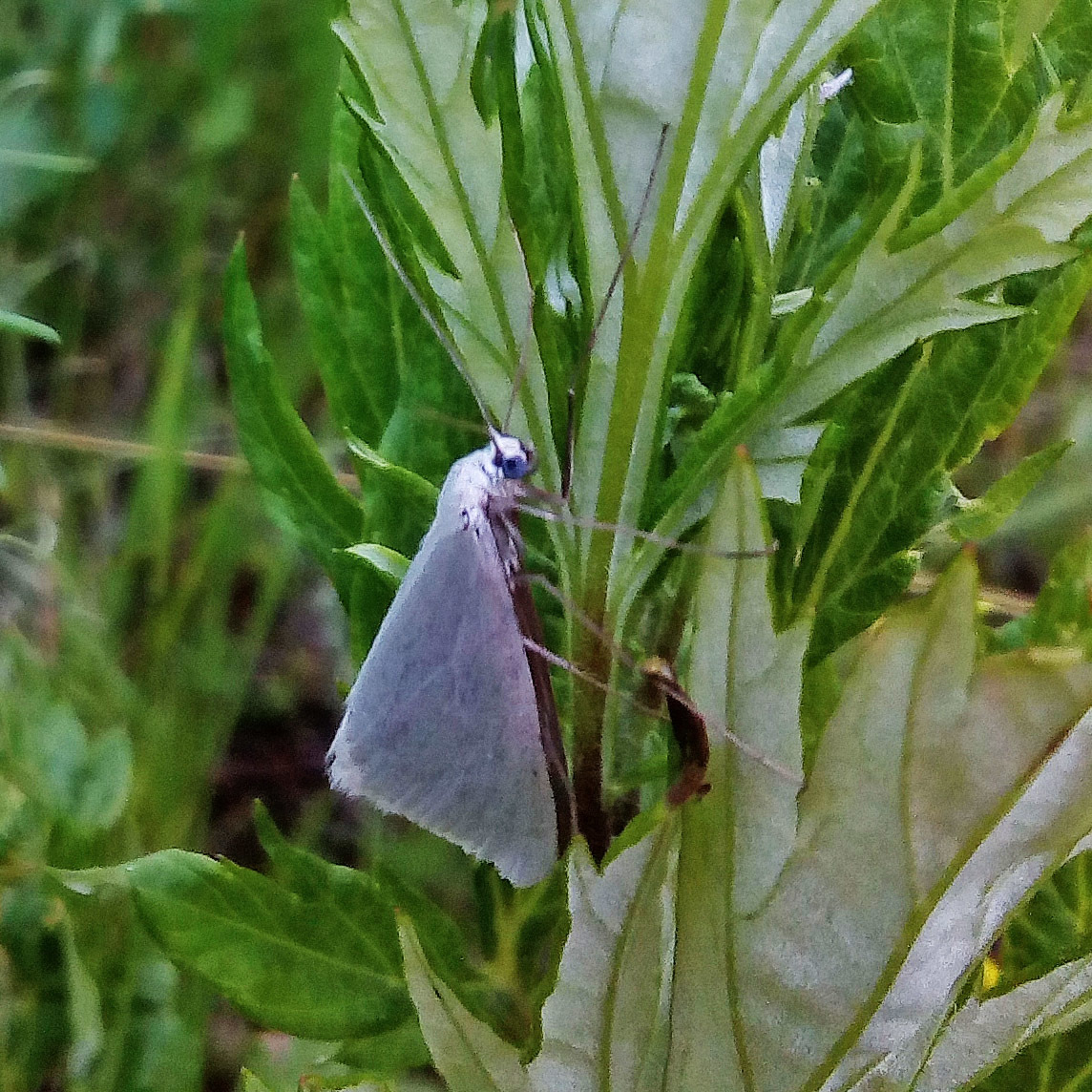
- Gypsochroa renitidata

Scientific classification
- Kingdom: Animalia
- Phylum: Arthropoda
- Clade: Pancrustacea
- Class: Insecta
- Order: Lepidoptera
- Family: Geometridae
- Subfamily: Larentiinae
- Genus: Gypsochroa; Hübner, 1825

= Gypsochroa =

Genus of moths

Gypsochroa is a genus of moths in the family Geometridae first described by Jacob Hübner in 1825.
