= Polyclysta =

Scientific classification
- Kingdom: Animalia
- Phylum: Arthropoda
- Clade: Pancrustacea
- Class: Insecta
- Order: Lepidoptera
- Family: Geometridae
- Genus: Polyclysta

Genus of moths

Polyclysta is a genus of moths in the family Geometridae.

The moth has grey/brown wings each with several dark zigzag transverse lines, and several darker patches. The wingspan is about 1.5 cm.
