= Remodes =

Scientific classification
- Kingdom: Animalia
- Phylum: Arthropoda
- Clade: Pancrustacea
- Class: Insecta
- Order: Lepidoptera
- Family: Geometridae
- Genus: Remodes; Guenée, 1857

Genus of moths

Remodes is a genus of moths in the family Geometridae.
