= Piercia =

Scientific classification
- Kingdom: Animalia
- Phylum: Arthropoda
- Clade: Pancrustacea
- Class: Insecta
- Order: Lepidoptera
- Family: Geometridae
- Tribe: Cataclysmiini
- Genus: Piercia; Janse, 1933

Type species
- Epirrhoe prasinaria Warren, 1901

Diversity
- Almost 60 species

Genus of moths

Piercia is a genus in the geometer moth family (Geometridae). It belongs to subfamily Larentiinae, but therein its relationships are fairly obscure. About ten species occur in southern and eastern Asia, but most – almost 50 as of 2005 – are found in Africa.

== Selected species ==
Species of Piercia include:

- Piercia alpinaria Krüger, 2005
- Piercia dryas (Prout, 1915)
- Piercia lichenocosmia Krüger, 2005
- Piercia petraria Krüger, 2005
- Piercia prasinaria (Warren, 1901)
- Piercia smaragdinata (Walker, 1862)
- Piercia cf. smaragdinata 'Janse 1933'
