= Cyclica =

Scientific classification
- Kingdom: Animalia
- Phylum: Arthropoda
- Class: Insecta
- Order: Lepidoptera
- Family: Geometridae
- Subfamily: Larentiinae
- Genus: Cyclica; Grote, 1882
- Species: C. frondaria

Binomial name
- Cyclica frondaria Grote, 1882

Genus of moths

Cyclica is a monotypic moth genus in the family Geometridae. Its only species, Cyclica frondaria, is found in the US states of Arizona, New Mexico and Texas. Both the genus and species were first described by Augustus Radcliffe Grote in 1882.
