= Trichozoma =

Scientific classification
- Kingdom: Animalia
- Phylum: Arthropoda
- Clade: Pancrustacea
- Class: Insecta
- Order: Lepidoptera
- Family: Geometridae
- Genus: Trichozoma

Genus of moths

Trichozoma is a genus of moths in the family Geometridae.

== Species ==
- T. albidulata Warren, 1904
- T. morbosata Snellen, 1874
- T. picaria Bastelberger, 1909
