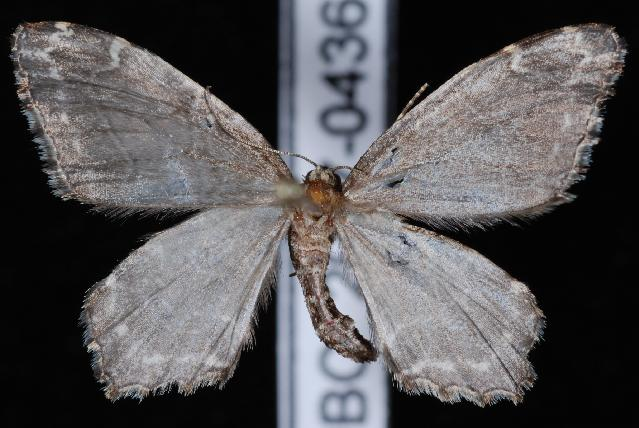

Scientific classification
- Kingdom: Animalia
- Phylum: Arthropoda
- Clade: Pancrustacea
- Class: Insecta
- Order: Lepidoptera
- Family: Geometridae
- Subfamily: Larentiinae
- Tribe: Hydriomenini
- Genus: Ceratodalia; Packard, 1876
- Species: C. gueneata

Binomial name
- Ceratodalia gueneata Packard, 1876

Synonyms
- Ceratodalia excurvata (Grote, 1883)

= Ceratodalia =

Genus of moths

Ceratodalia is a genus of moths in the family Geometridae, containing only one species, Ceratodalia gueneata, which is found in western North America, ranging from British Columbia and Alberta to Colorado and California.
