= Nothoporinia =

Scientific classification
- Kingdom: Animalia
- Phylum: Arthropoda
- Clade: Pancrustacea
- Class: Insecta
- Order: Lepidoptera
- Family: Geometridae
- Genus: Nothoporinia; Inoue, 1942

Genus of moths

Nothoporinia is a genus of moths in the family Geometridae, known for their looping caterpillars called inchworms.
