= Erebochlora =

Scientific classification
- Kingdom: Animalia
- Phylum: Arthropoda
- Class: Insecta
- Order: Lepidoptera
- Family: Geometridae
- Genus: Erebochlora; Warren, 1895
- Species: E. tesserulata

Binomial name
- Erebochlora tesserulata (Felder & Rogenhofer, 1875)

Genus of moths

Erebochlora is a monotypic moth genus in the family Geometridae described by Warren in 1895. Its only species, Erebochlora tesserulata, was first described by Felder and Rogenhofer in 1875. It is found in Colombia.
