= Anemplocia =

Scientific classification
- Kingdom: Animalia
- Phylum: Arthropoda
- Class: Insecta
- Order: Lepidoptera
- Family: Geometridae
- Subfamily: Larentiinae
- Genus: Anemplocia; Warren, 1905

Genus of geometer moths

Anemplocia is a genus of moths in the family Geometridae erected by Warren in 1905.

== Species ==
- Anemplocia flammifera (Warren, 1905)
- Anemplocia grandis (H. Druce, 1911)
- Anemplocia imparata Walker, [1865]
- Anemplocia melambathes Prout, 1923
- Anemplocia meteora Dognin, 1911
- Anemplocia scalpellata Dognin, 1911
- Anemplocia splendens (H. Druce, 1885)
