= Carptima =

Scientific classification
- Kingdom: Animalia
- Phylum: Arthropoda
- Class: Insecta
- Order: Lepidoptera
- Family: Geometridae
- Subfamily: Larentiinae
- Genus: Carptima; Pearsall, 1906
- Species: C. hydriomenata

Binomial name
- Carptima hydriomenata Pearsall, 1906

Genus of moths

Carptima is a monotypic moth genus in the family Geometridae. Its only species, Carptima hydriomenata, is found in the US state of Arizona. Both the genus and species were first described by Pearsall in 1906.
