= Eremodorea =

Scientific classification
- Kingdom: Animalia
- Phylum: Arthropoda
- Class: Insecta
- Order: Lepidoptera
- Family: Geometridae
- Genus: Eremodorea; Turner, 1939
- Species: E. haplopsara

Binomial name
- Eremodorea haplopsara Turner, 1939

Genus of moths

Eremodorea is a monotypic moth genus in the family Geometridae. Its only species, Eremodorea haplopsara, is found in Australia. Both the genus and species were first described by Turner in 1939.
