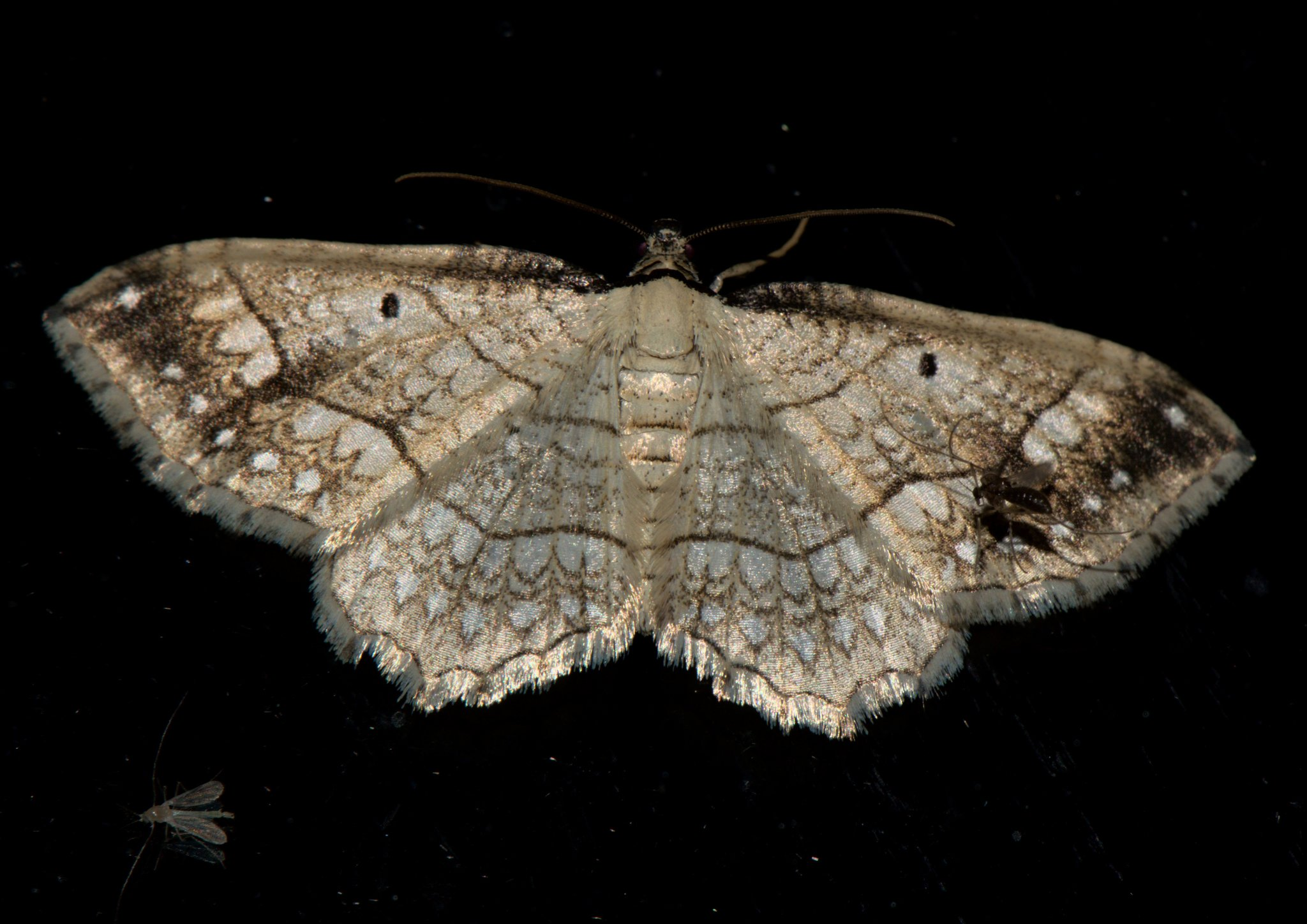
- Laciniodes plurilinearia

Scientific classification
- Kingdom: Animalia
- Phylum: Arthropoda
- Class: Insecta
- Order: Lepidoptera
- Family: Geometridae
- Tribe: Asthenini
- Genus: Laciniodes

= Laciniodes =

Genus of moths

Laciniodes is a genus of moths in the family Geometridae.
