= Phoenissa =

Scientific classification
- Kingdom: Animalia
- Phylum: Arthropoda
- Clade: Pancrustacea
- Class: Insecta
- Order: Lepidoptera
- Family: Geometridae
- Subfamily: Larentiinae
- Genus: Phoenissa; Warren, 1899

Species
- 5, see text

Synonyms
- Scordonia Thierry-Mieg, 1903

Genus of moths

Phoenissa is a geometer moth genus in the subfamily Larentiinae.

The species in this genus are:

- Phoenissa brephos (Oberthür, 1884)
- Phoenissa ischna (Prout, 1938)
- Phoenissa lamae (Alphéraky, 1897)
- Phoenissa leucophoca (Prout, 1938)
- Phoenissa uber (Prout, 1938)
