= Hospitalia =

Scientific classification
- Kingdom: Animalia
- Phylum: Arthropoda
- Clade: Pancrustacea
- Class: Insecta
- Order: Lepidoptera
- Family: Geometridae
- Subfamily: Larentiinae
- Tribe: Rheumapterini
- Genus: Hospitalia; Agenjo, 1950
- Species: H. flavolineata

Binomial name
- Hospitalia flavolineata (Staudinger, 1883)

Genus of moths

Hospitalia is a monotypic moth genus in the family Geometridae erected by Ramón Agenjo Cecilia in 1950. Its only species, Hospitalia flavolineata, was first described by Otto Staudinger in 1883. It is found in south-western Europe.
