= Aeschrostoma =

Scientific classification
- Kingdom: Animalia
- Phylum: Arthropoda
- Class: Insecta
- Order: Lepidoptera
- Family: Geometridae
- Subfamily: Oenochrominae
- Genus: Aeschrostoma; Warren, 1903
- Species: A. marmorata

Binomial name
- Aeschrostoma marmorata Warren, 1903

Monotypic genus of geometer moths

Aeschrostoma is a monotypic moth genus in the family Geometridae. It has a single species, Aeschrostoma marmorata, known from New Guinea. Both the genus and species were described by Warren in 1903.
