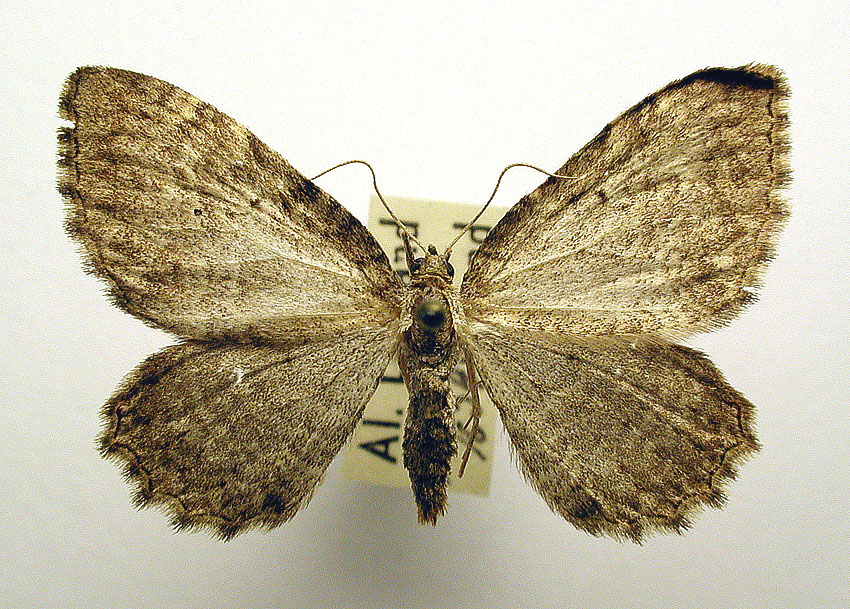
- Philereme vetulata

Scientific classification
- Kingdom: Animalia
- Phylum: Arthropoda
- Class: Insecta
- Order: Lepidoptera
- Family: Geometridae
- Subfamily: Larentiinae
- Genus: Philereme; Hübner, 1825

= Philereme =

Genus of moths

Philereme is a genus of moths in the family Geometridae erected by Jacob Hübner in 1825. It is the only genus in the tribe Phileremini.

== Species ==
- Philereme neglectata (Staudinger, 1892)
- Philereme senescens (Staudinger, 1892)
- Philereme transversata (Hufnagel, 1767)
- Philereme vetulata (Denis & Schiffermüller, 1775)
