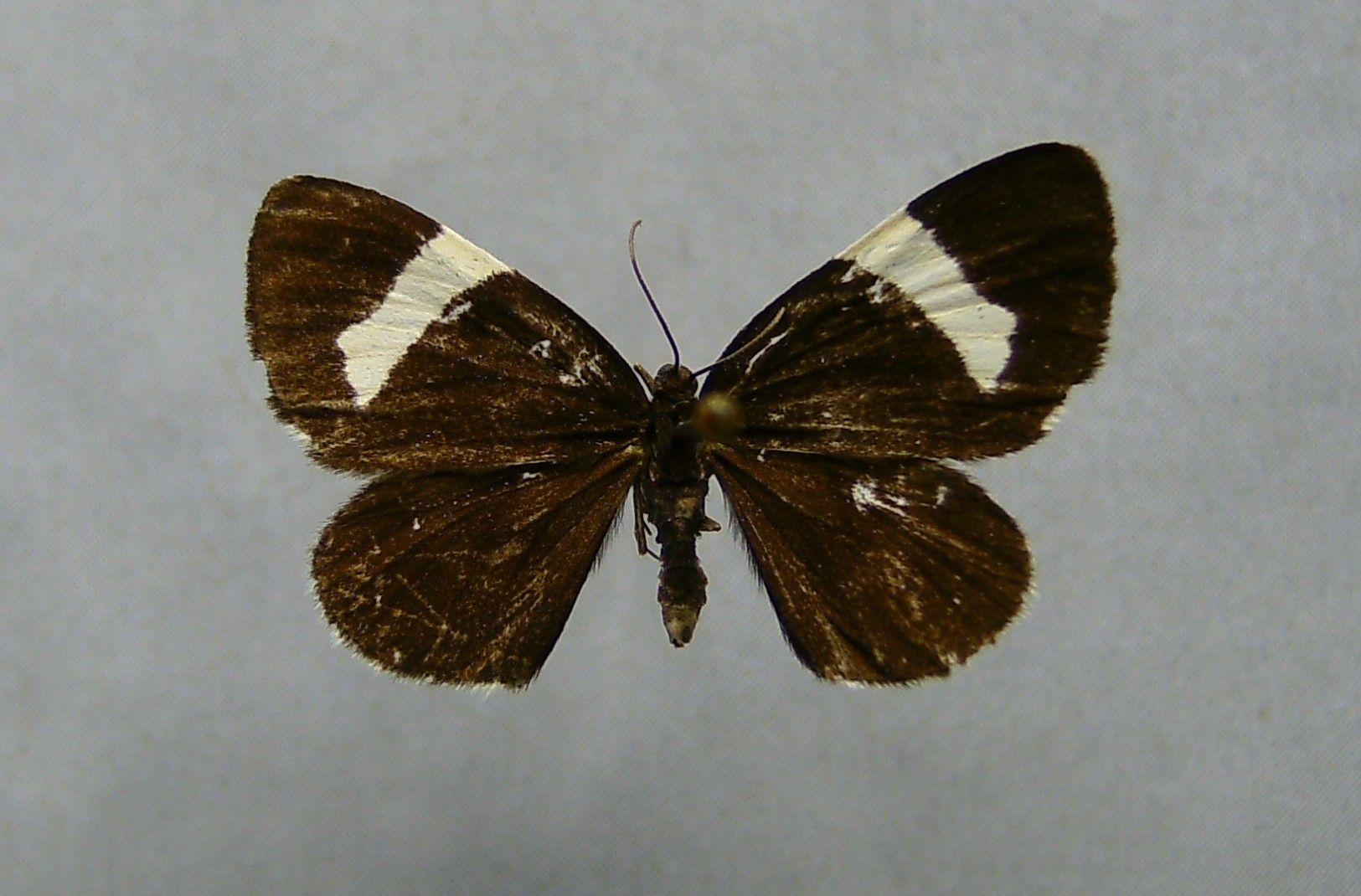
- Baptria tibiale

Scientific classification
- Kingdom: Animalia
- Phylum: Arthropoda
- Clade: Pancrustacea
- Class: Insecta
- Order: Lepidoptera
- Family: Geometridae
- Tribe: Solitaneini
- Genus: Baptria; Hübner, 1825
- Species: B. tibiale

Binomial name
- Baptria tibiale (Esper, 1791)

Synonyms
- Generic: Psychogoes Butler, 1877; Specific: Odezia tibiale; Phalaena tibiale

= Baptria =

Genus of moths

Baptria is a monotypic genus of moth in the family Geometridae erected by Jacob Hübner in 1825. Its only species, Baptria tibiale, was first described by Eugenius Johann Christoph Esper in 1791. It is found in central and northern Europe.

The wingspan is 22–26 mm. The moth flies from June to July depending on the location.

The larvae feed on Actaea species, such as A. spicata and A. erythrocarpa.

== Subspecies ==
The following subspecies are accepted:

- Baptria tibiale borealis Lankiala, 1937
- Baptria tibiale fennica Lankiala, 1937
- Baptria tibiale tibiale (Esper, 1791)
