= Ochodontia =

Scientific classification
- Kingdom: Animalia
- Phylum: Arthropoda
- Class: Insecta
- Order: Lepidoptera
- Family: Geometridae
- Tribe: Rhodometrini
- Genus: Ochodontia; Lederer, 1853

Genus of moths

Ochodontia is a genus of moths in the family Geometridae described by Julius Lederer in 1853.
