= Glaucorhoe =

Scientific classification
- Kingdom: Animalia
- Phylum: Arthropoda
- Class: Insecta
- Order: Lepidoptera
- Family: Geometridae
- Tribe: Xanthorhoini
- Genus: Glaucorhoe; Herbulot, 1951

Genus of moths

Glaucorhoe is a genus of moths in the family Geometridae erected by Claude Herbulot in 1951.
