= Pseudomennis =

Scientific classification
- Kingdom: Animalia
- Phylum: Arthropoda
- Clade: Pancrustacea
- Class: Insecta
- Order: Lepidoptera
- Family: Geometridae
- Genus: Pseudomennis; H. Druce in Godman & Salvin, 1885

Genus of moths

Pseudomennis is a genus of moths in the family Geometridae erected by Herbert Druce in 1885.

== Species ==
- Pseudomennis bipennis (Walker, 1854)
- Pseudomennis coccinea Druce, 1885
- Pseudomennis dioptoides (Warren, 1905)
