= Hymenodria =

Scientific classification
- Kingdom: Animalia
- Phylum: Arthropoda
- Class: Insecta
- Order: Lepidoptera
- Family: Geometridae
- Genus: Hymenodria; McDunnough, 1954
- Species: H. mediodentata

Binomial name
- Hymenodria mediodentata (Barnes & McDunnough, 1911)

Genus of moths

Hymenodria is a monotypic moth genus in the family Geometridae erected by James Halliday McDunnough in 1954. Its only species, Hymenodria mediodentata, was first described by William Barnes and McDunnough in 1911. It is found in North America.

The MONA or Hodges number for Hymenodria mediodentata is 7278.
