= Eurhinosea =

Scientific classification
- Kingdom: Animalia
- Phylum: Arthropoda
- Clade: Pancrustacea
- Class: Insecta
- Order: Lepidoptera
- Family: Geometridae
- Genus: Eurhinosea; Packard, 1873
- Species: E. flavaria

Binomial name
- Eurhinosea flavaria Packard, 1873

Genus of moths

Eurhinosea is a monotypic moth genus in the family Geometridae. Its only species, Eurhinosea flavaria, is found in western North America. The genus and species were both described by Packard in 1873.
