= Solitanea =

Scientific classification
- Kingdom: Animalia
- Phylum: Arthropoda
- Class: Insecta
- Order: Lepidoptera
- Family: Geometridae
- Tribe: Cidariini
- Genus: Solitanea; Djakonov, 1924

Genus of moths

Solitanea is a genus of moths in the family Geometridae erected by Alexander Michailovitsch Djakonov in 1924.

== Species ==
- Solitanea mariae (Stauder, 1921) Italy
- Solitanea defricata (Püngeler, 1903) Sakhalin, Amur, Primorye, Transbaikalia, Buryatia, Japan, China (Heilongjiang)
