= Scelidacantha =

Scientific classification
- Kingdom: Animalia
- Phylum: Arthropoda
- Clade: Pancrustacea
- Class: Insecta
- Order: Lepidoptera
- Family: Geometridae
- Genus: Scelidacantha; Hulst, 1896

Type species
- Lithostege triseriata Packard, 1874

Genus of moths

Scelidacantha is a genus of moths in the family Geometridae first described by George Duryea Hulst in 1896.

== Species ==
- Scelidacantha narosa Druce 1899
- Scelidacantha triseriata Packard 1874
