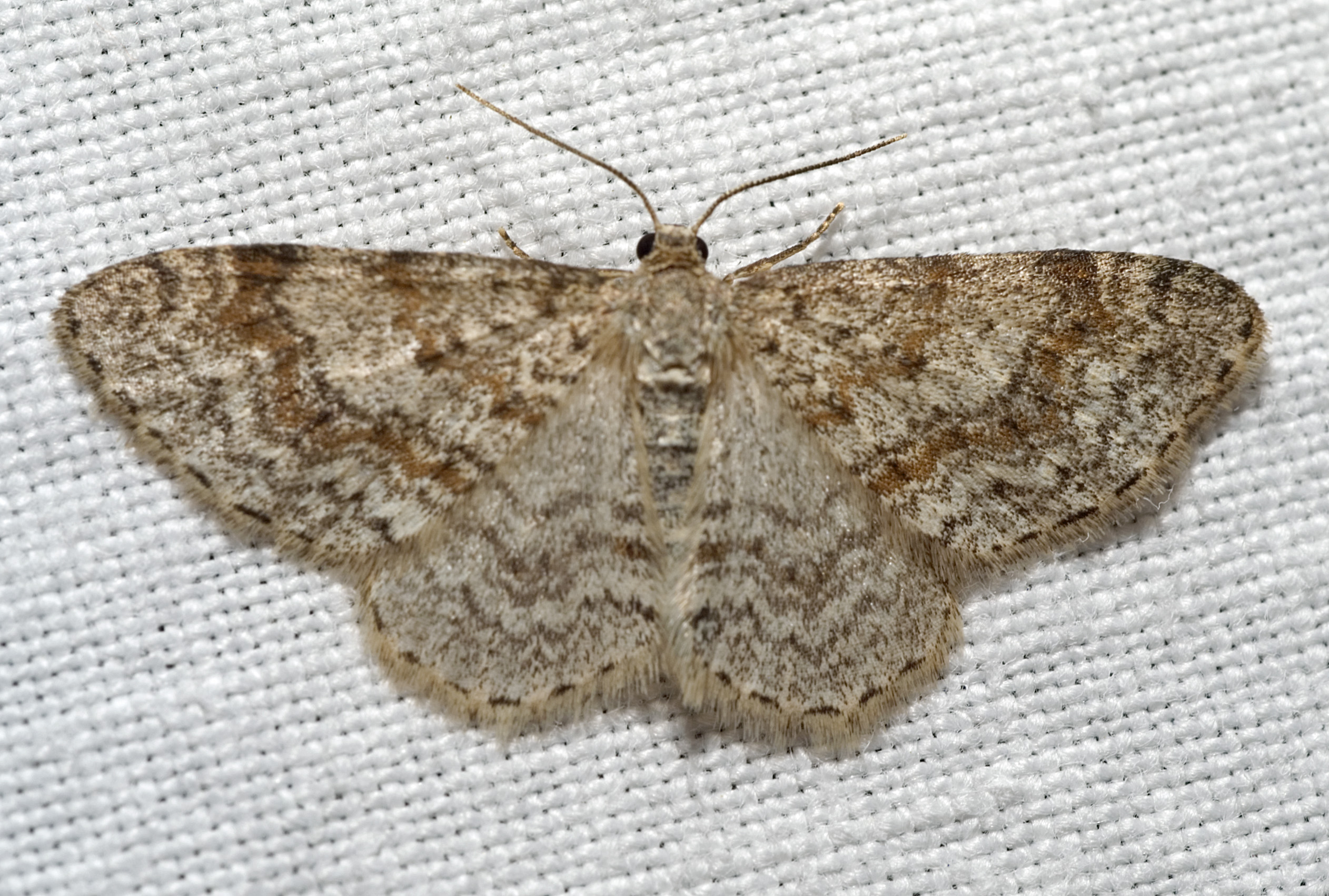
- Waved carpet (Hydrelia sylvata: Asthenini)

Scientific classification
- Kingdom: Animalia
- Phylum: Arthropoda
- Clade: Pancrustacea
- Class: Insecta
- Order: Lepidoptera
- Family: Geometridae
- Subfamily: Larentiinae; Duponchel, 1845

Tribes
- Asthenini; Cataclysmiini; Chesiadini; Cidariini; Erateinini; Eudulini; Eupitheciini; Hydriomenini; Larentiini; Melanthiini; Operophterini; Perizomini; Phileremini; Rheumapterini; Solitaneini; Stamnodini; Trichopterygini; Xanthorhoini

Synonyms
- Larentites Duponchel, 1845

= Larentiinae =

Subfamily of moths

Larentiinae is a subfamily of moths containing roughly 5,800 species that occur mostly in the temperate regions of the world. They are generally considered a subfamily of the geometer moth family (Geometridae) and are divided into a few large or good-sized tribes, and numerous very small or even monotypic ones which might not always be valid. Well-known members are the "pug moths" of the Eupitheciini and the "carpets", mainly of the Cidariini and Xanthorhoini. The subfamily was described by Philogène Auguste Joseph Duponchel in 1845.

== Systematics and description ==
Morphological and DNA sequence data indicate that they are a very ancient lineage of geometer moths; they might even be distinct enough to warrant elevation to full family status in the superfamily Geometroidea. They share numerous plesiomorphic traits – for example at least one areola in the forewing, a hammer-shaped ansa of the tympanal organ and the lack of a gnathos – with the Sterrhinae which are either somewhat less distant from other geometer moths or are part of the same distinct lineage; the Lythriini were until recently placed in the Larentiinae but are apparently Sterrhinae.

But the Larentiinae characteristically tend to have much longer foreleg tarsi and hindleg tibiae than their relatives, and also have hairy or toothed extensions on the upperside sections of the transtilla; their caterpillars often have the abdominal prolegs reduced already (as is typical for the more advanced geometer moths), and the Larentiinae's tympanal organs have a unique and characteristic structure.

== Selected genera and species ==
Asthenini
- Euchoeca
- Hydrelia
- Poecilasthena
- Venusia

Cataclysmiini

- Phibalapteryx
  - Phibalapteryx virgata – oblique striped

Chesiadini

- Aplocera
- Chesias
- Odezia

Erateinini

- Erateina

Eupitheciini

- Chloroclystis
- Eupithecia – typical pugs
- Gymnoscelis
- Microdes

Hydriomenini

- Anachloris
- Hydriomena

Larentiini

- Anticlea
- Larentia
- Mesoleuca
- Pelurga
- Spargania

Melanthiini

- Horisme
- Melanthia

Operophterini

- Epirrita
- Operophtera

Perizomini

- Martania
- Mesotype
- Perizoma
- Pseudobaptria

Rheumapterini

- Rheumaptera
- Triphosa

Solitaneini

- Baptria

Trichopterygini

- Lobophora
  - Lobophora halterata – seraphim
- Pterapherapteryx

Xanthorhoini

- Camptogramma
- Chrysolarentia
- Epirrhoe
- Epyaxa
- Euphyia
- Glaucorhoe
- Orthonama
- Scotopteryx
- Xanthorhoe

== Genera incertae sedis ==
Several genera have hitherto not been definitely assigned to a tribe. These include:

- Anemplocia
- Archirhoe
- Arctesthes
- Arrayanaria
- Carptima (Hydriomenini?)
- Celonoptera (Trichopterygini?)
- Ceratodalia
- Coryphista
- Cyclica (Hydriomenini?)
- Daniela
- Dyspteris
- Epiphryne
- Ersephila (Hydriomenini?)
- Eurhinosea
- Eutrepsia (Hydriomenini?)
- Grossbeckia (Hydriomenini?)
- Gypsochroa
- Hagnagora
- Hammaptera
- Hospitalia (Rheumapterini?)
- Hymenodria (Hydriomenini?)
- Monostoechia D. S. Fletcher, 1978
- Obila
- Ochodontia
- Phoenissa
- Piercia
- Psaliodes
- Pseudomennis
- Pterocypha
- Scelidacantha
