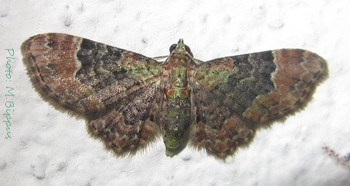

Scientific classification
- Kingdom: Animalia
- Phylum: Arthropoda
- Clade: Pancrustacea
- Class: Insecta
- Order: Lepidoptera
- Family: Geometridae
- Tribe: Eupitheciini
- Genus: Chloroclystis; Hübner, [1825]

Synonyms
- Aetheolepis Warren, 1896; Chloroplintha Warren, 1897; Dyserga Petersen, 1909; Gnamptomia Warren, 1902; Gymnopera Warren, 1896; Oligoclystia Bastelberger, 1911; Sesquiptera Warren, 1896; Simotricha Warren, 1897

= Chloroclystis =

Genus of moths

Chloroclystis is a genus of moths in the family Geometridae first described by Jacob Hübner in 1825.

== Description ==
Palpi with second joint thickly scaled and reaching beyond the sharp frontal tuft, third joint prominent. Antennae of male annulated. Hind tibia with two spur pairs. Abdomen with slight dorsal crests. Forewings with vein 3 from angle of cell. Vein 5 from middle of discocellulars and vein 6 from upper angle. Veins 10 and 11 stalked, and vein 10 anastomosing (fusing) with veins 7, 8 and 9 to form the large areole. Vein 11 becoming coincident with vein 12. Hindwings with vein 5 from middle of discocellulars. Vein 6 and 7 stalked, and vein 8 anastomosing with vein 7 to beyond middle of cell.

== Species ==
- Chloroclystis acervicosta
- Chloroclystis actephilae
- Chloroclystis alpnista
- Chloroclystis ambundata
- Chloroclystis analyta
- Chloroclystis androgyna
- Chloroclystis angelica
- Chloroclystis annimasi
- Chloroclystis apotoma
- Chloroclystis approximata
- Chloroclystis athaumasta
- Chloroclystis atroviridis
- Chloroclystis autopepla
- Chloroclystis biangulata
- Chloroclystis blanda
- Chloroclystis boarmica
- Chloroclystis bosora
- Chloroclystis breyniae
- Chloroclystis catastreptes
- Chloroclystis catoglypta
- Chloroclystis celidota
- Chloroclystis coloptila
- Chloroclystis comorana
- Chloroclystis consocer
- Chloroclystis continuata
- Chloroclystis conversa
- Chloroclystis costicavata
- Chloroclystis cryptolopha
- Chloroclystis cuneilinea
- Chloroclystis decimana
- Chloroclystis delosticha
- Chloroclystis dentatissima
- Chloroclystis distigma
- Chloroclystis eichhorni
- Chloroclystis elaeopa
- Chloroclystis elaiachroma
- Chloroclystis embolocosma
- Chloroclystis ericinellae
- Chloroclystis exilipicta
- Chloroclystis exsanguis
- Chloroclystis filata
- Chloroclystis flaviornata
- Chloroclystis fragilis
- Chloroclystis gerberae
- Chloroclystis grisea
- Chloroclystis guttifera
- Chloroclystis gymnoscelides
- Chloroclystis hawkinsi
- Chloroclystis horistes
- Chloroclystis hypopyrrha
- Chloroclystis hypotmeta
- Chloroclystis ignava
- Chloroclystis impudicis
- Chloroclystis inaequata
- Chloroclystis inductata
- Chloroclystis infrazebrina
- Chloroclystis inops
- Chloroclystis invisibilis
- Chloroclystis kampalensis
- Chloroclystis katherina
- Chloroclystis laetitia
- Chloroclystis latifasciata
- Chloroclystis leucopygata
- Chloroclystis lichenodes
- Chloroclystis luciana
- Chloroclystis macroaedeagus
- Chloroclystis manusela
- Chloroclystis mariae
- Chloroclystis metallospora
- Chloroclystis mira
- Chloroclystis mniochroa
- Chloroclystis mokensis
- Chloroclystis muscosa
- Chloroclystis naga
- Chloroclystis neoconversa
- Chloroclystis nereis
- Chloroclystis nigrilineata
- Chloroclystis nudifunda
- Chloroclystis obturgescens
- Chloroclystis olivata
- Chloroclystis omocydia
- Chloroclystis onusta
- Chloroclystis palaearctica
- Chloroclystis pallidiplaga
- Chloroclystis palmaria
- Chloroclystis papillosa
- Chloroclystis parthenia
- Chloroclystis pauxillula
- Chloroclystis perissa
- Chloroclystis permixta
- Chloroclystis phoenochyta
- Chloroclystis pitoi
- Chloroclystis plinthochyta
- Chloroclystis poliophrica
- Chloroclystis polygraphata
- Chloroclystis primivernalis
- Chloroclystis pugnax
- Chloroclystis pyrrholopha
- Chloroclystis pyrsodonta
- Chloroclystis rectaria
- Chloroclystis rhodopis
- Chloroclystis rietzi
- Chloroclystis roetschkei
- Chloroclystis rotundaria
- Chloroclystis rubicunda
- Chloroclystis rubrinotata
- Chloroclystis rubroviridis
- Chloroclystis rufitincta
- Chloroclystis rufofasciata
- Chloroclystis ruptiscripta
- Chloroclystis schoenei
- Chloroclystis semiscripta
- Chloroclystis senex
- Chloroclystis sierraria
- Chloroclystis solidifascia
- Chloroclystis sordida
- Chloroclystis speciosa
- Chloroclystis sphragitis
- Chloroclystis spissidentata
- Chloroclystis stenophrica
- Chloroclystis taraxichroma
- Chloroclystis taxata
- Chloroclystis thermastobrita
- Chloroclystis torninubis
- Chloroclystis tortuosa
- Chloroclystis tridentata
- Chloroclystis variospila
- Chloroclystis v-ata
- Chloroclystis velutina
- Chloroclystis viridata
- Chloroclystis viridigrisea
- Chloroclystis xenisma
- Chloroclystis zhuoxinensis

== Species of unknown status ==
- Chloroclystis rostrata (Guenee, 1858), described as Eupithecia rostrata

== Taxonomy ==
A number of synonyms have been revived and are now considered valid genera. These include:

- Ardonis Moore, 1888
- Axinoptera Hampson, 1893
- Bosara Walker, 1866
- Dasimatia Warren, 1858
- Eriopithex Warren, 1896
- Mesocolpia Warren, 1901
- Pasiphila Meyrick, 1883
- Pasiphilodes Warren, 1895
- Phrissogonus Butler, 1882
- Polysphalia Warren, 1906
- Ptychotheca Warren, 1906
- Pycnoloma Warren, 1906
- Rhinoprora Warren, 1895
- Syncosmia Warren, 1897
