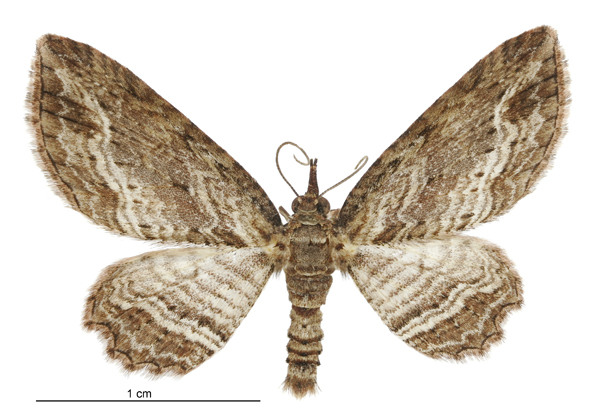
- Male specimen
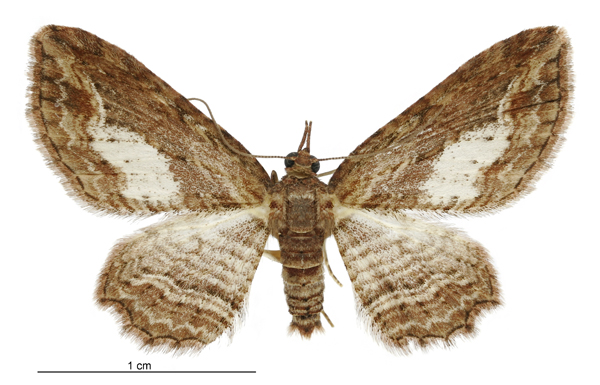
- Female specimen

Scientific classification
- Kingdom: Animalia
- Phylum: Arthropoda
- Clade: Pancrustacea
- Class: Insecta
- Order: Lepidoptera
- Family: Geometridae
- Genus: Chloroclystis
- Species: C. filata

Binomial name
- Chloroclystis filata (Guenée, 1857)

Synonyms
- Eupithecia filata Guenée, 1857; Phibalapteryx rubroferrata Walker, 1862

= Chloroclystis filata =

Species of moth

Chloroclystis filata, the Australian pug moth, is a species of moth of the family Geometridae. It is native to Australia and is found in the south eastern quarter of Australia and on Norfolk Island. It self-introduced itself to New Zealand in 1960. In Australia host plants are acacias (the blossoms) and Fabaceae (the petals).

== Taxonomy ==
This species was first described by Achille Guenée in 1857 and originally named Eupithecia filata. In 1958 L. B. Prout discussed this species under the name Chloroclystis albiplaga as an aberration of filata. The placement of this species in the genus Chloroclystis is in doubt. As a result, this species has also been referred to as Chloroclystis (s.l.) filata. The male holotype specimen is held at the Natural History Museum, London.

== Description ==
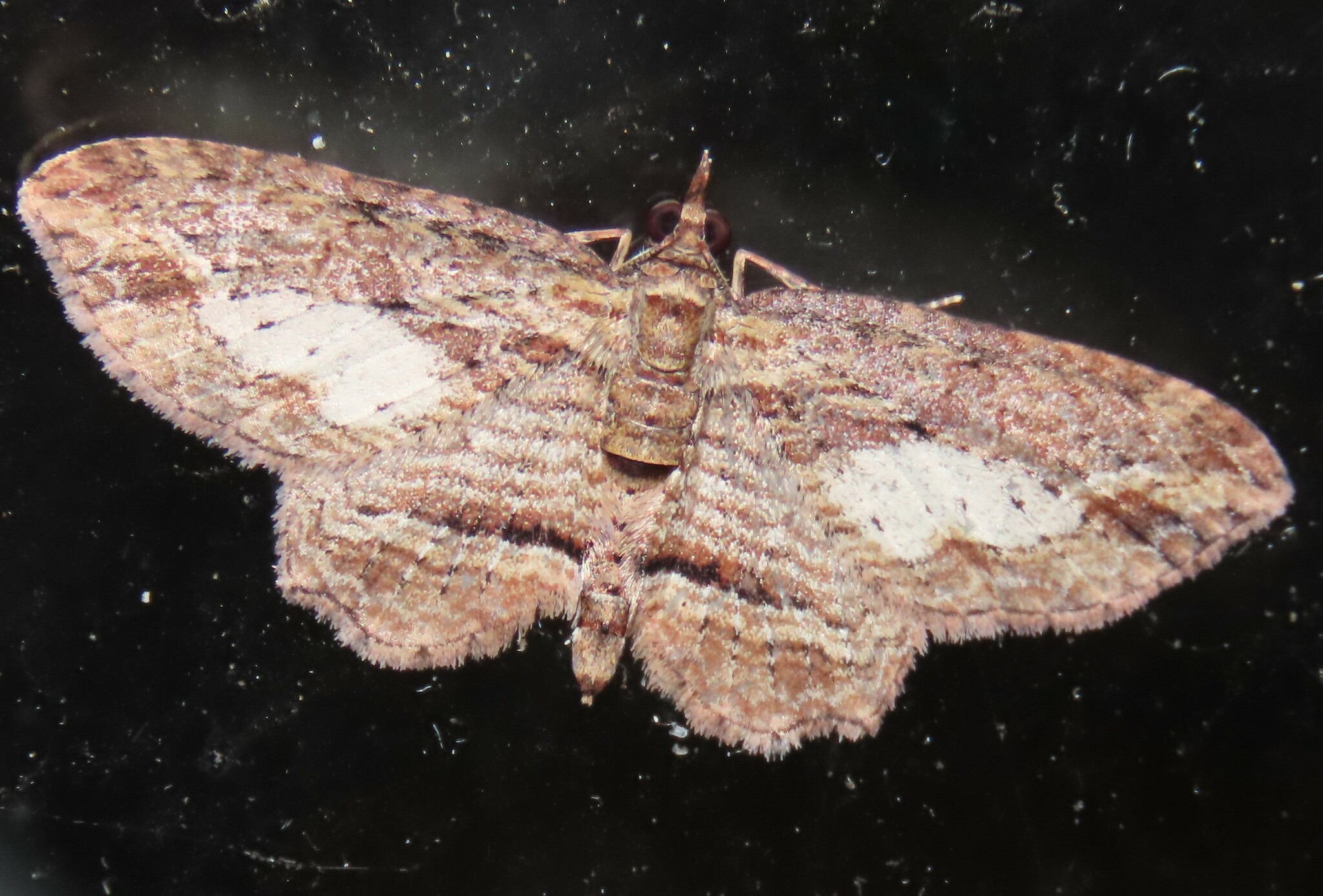
Living specimen showing white patches on forewings and the dark brown band and notched edges on the hindwings.

This species has a wingspan of between 20 and 25 mm. It has forewings that are brownish in colour. This species is variable with some specimens having the whole of their forewing being brown, pinkish brown or a black shade. Other specimens of this species have large white patches in the middle to lower portion of their forewings. This species can be distinguished from other species with a similar appearance as it has a dark brown band across the hindwings. The hindwings of this species are notched which assists with distinguishing this species from the brown coloured specimens of Chloroclystis inductata.

== Distribution ==
This species is native to Australia where it is found in the south eastern parts of that country as well as Norfolk Island. This species was introduced to New Zealand in 1960 and is found throughout the country. It is regarded as being very common in New Zealand.

== Habitat and hosts ==
The larvae of this species feed on the flowers of shrubs. In Australia host plants are in the genus Acacia (the blossoms) and species in the genus Fabaceae (the petals). In New Zealand have been observed feeding on the flowers of gorse and Senecio species.

== Behaviour ==
This species likely pupates on the ground. In New Zealand this species is on the wing throughout the year. They are nocturnal and are attracted to light.
