= Manusela =

Manusela may refer to:

== Animal ==
- Manusela mosaic-tailed rat, a species of rodent that is found in Indonesia
- Chloroclystis manusela, a species of moth that is found in Indonesia

== Anthropology ==
- Manusela people, an idigineous people from Seram island, Indonesia
- Manusela language, spoken by Manusela people

== Place ==
- Manusela National Park, located in Seram island, Indonesia
