= Chloroclystis impudicis =

Scientific classification
- Kingdom: Animalia
- Phylum: Arthropoda
- Clade: Pancrustacea
- Class: Insecta
- Order: Lepidoptera
- Family: Geometridae
- Genus: Chloroclystis
- Species: C. impudicis

Binomial name
- Chloroclystis impudicis Dugdale, 1964

Synonyms
- Pasiphila impudicis (Dugdale, 1964)

Species of moth

Chloroclystis impudicis is a moth in the family Geometridae. It was first described by John S. Dugdale in 1964. It is endemic to New Zealand, and is found only on Campbell Island. It is a small moth with a wingspan of between 15 and 17mm. The larval host plant is Hebe elliptica.

== Taxonomy ==
This species was first described by John S. Dugdale in 1964. In 1971 Dugdale placed this species in the genus Pasiphila. In 1988 Dugdale again placed this species in the genus Chloroclystis. The placement of this species in the genus Chloroclystis is in doubt. As a result, this species has also been referred to as Chloroclystis (s.l.) impudicis. The male holotype specimen, collected at Beeman Camp at Beeman Cove, is held at New Zealand Arthropod Collection.

== Description ==
Dugdale described the larva of this species as follows:

Dorsal stripe single, spiracular stripe pallid, weakly interrupted; chaetotaxy as in P. inductata; integument scobinations not forming imbricating patterns, and more regular in size; anal shield not apically deflexed.

The wingspan of the adults of this species is 15–17 mm. C. impudicis is externally identical in appearance to other species in this genus found on Campbell Island. This species has been distinguished as a result of differences in its genitalia. C. impudicis is the only species in Chloroclystis in New Zealand to have uncovered male genitalia. The male also lacks antennae pectinations thus making it recognisably different from males in the similar looking species Pasiphila aristias.

== Distribution ==
C. impudicis is endemic to Campbell Island in New Zealand.

== Hosts ==
The larval host plant of this species is Hebe elliptica.
