= Chloroclystis exsanguis =

Scientific classification
- Kingdom: Animalia
- Phylum: Arthropoda
- Clade: Pancrustacea
- Class: Insecta
- Order: Lepidoptera
- Family: Geometridae
- Genus: Chloroclystis
- Species: C. exsanguis

Binomial name
- Chloroclystis exsanguis Warren, 1907

Species of moth

Chloroclystis exsanguis is a moth in the family Geometridae. It is found in New Guinea.
