= Chloroclystis rotundaria =

Scientific classification
- Domain: Eukaryota
- Kingdom: Animalia
- Phylum: Arthropoda
- Class: Insecta
- Order: Lepidoptera
- Family: Geometridae
- Genus: Chloroclystis
- Species: C. rotundaria

Binomial name
- Chloroclystis rotundaria C. Swinhoe, 1902

Species of moth

Chloroclystis rotundaria is a moth in the family Geometridae. It was described by Charles Swinhoe in 1902. It is found on New Guinea.
