= Chloroclystis plinthochyta =

Scientific classification
- Kingdom: Animalia
- Phylum: Arthropoda
- Clade: Pancrustacea
- Class: Insecta
- Order: Lepidoptera
- Family: Geometridae
- Genus: Chloroclystis
- Species: C. plinthochyta

Binomial name
- Chloroclystis plinthochyta Turner, 1931

Species of moth

Chloroclystis plinthochyta is a moth in the family Geometridae. It was described by Turner in 1931. It is endemic to Australia (Queensland).

Adults have greyish-brown patterned wings.
