= Chloroclystis palaearctica =

Scientific classification
- Domain: Eukaryota
- Kingdom: Animalia
- Phylum: Arthropoda
- Class: Insecta
- Order: Lepidoptera
- Family: Geometridae
- Genus: Chloroclystis
- Species: C. palaearctica

Binomial name
- Chloroclystis palaearctica Brandt, 1938

Species of moth

Chloroclystis palaearctica is a moth in the family Geometridae. It is endemic to the United Arab Emirates.
