= Chloroclystis variospila =

Scientific classification
- Domain: Eukaryota
- Kingdom: Animalia
- Phylum: Arthropoda
- Class: Insecta
- Order: Lepidoptera
- Family: Geometridae
- Genus: Chloroclystis
- Species: C. variospila

Binomial name
- Chloroclystis variospila (Warren, 1895)

Synonyms
- Rhinoprora variospila Warren, 1895; Pasiphila variospila

Species of moth

Chloroclystis variospila is a moth in the family Geometridae. It was described by Warren in 1895. It is found on Peninsular Malaysia.

The wingspan is about 18 millimetres (0.71 in). The forewings are greenish or greyish green with fuscous cross lines, mixed with red scales. The hindwings are pale grey, becoming greenish towards the hindmargin, with three or four indistinct darker curved fasciae.
