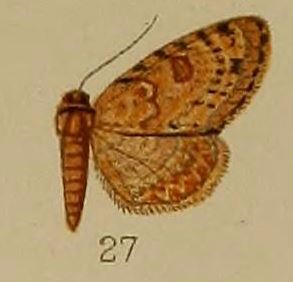

Scientific classification
- Kingdom: Animalia
- Phylum: Arthropoda
- Class: Insecta
- Order: Lepidoptera
- Family: Geometridae
- Genus: Axinoptera
- Species: A. plicata

Binomial name
- Axinoptera plicata (Hampson, 1912)

Synonyms
- Chloroclystis plicata Hampson, 1912

= Axinoptera plicata =

Species of moth

Axinoptera plicata is a moth in the family Geometridae. It is found in Sri Lanka.
