= Chloroclystis inaequata =

Scientific classification
- Kingdom: Animalia
- Phylum: Arthropoda
- Clade: Pancrustacea
- Class: Insecta
- Order: Lepidoptera
- Family: Geometridae
- Genus: Chloroclystis
- Species: C. inaequata

Binomial name
- Chloroclystis inaequata (Warren, 1896)

Synonyms
- Sesquiptera inaequata Warren, 1896

Species of moth

Chloroclystis inaequata is a moth in the family Geometridae. It is found in the north-eastern Himalayas and on Java and Bali.

== Subspecies ==
- Chloroclystis inaequata inaequata
- Chloroclystis inaequata scotosema Prout, 1937
