= Axinoptera infusata =

Scientific classification
- Kingdom: Animalia
- Phylum: Arthropoda
- Clade: Pancrustacea
- Class: Insecta
- Order: Lepidoptera
- Family: Geometridae
- Genus: Axinoptera
- Species: A. infusata

Binomial name
- Axinoptera infusata (Walker, 1866)

Synonyms
- Eupithecia infusata Walker, 1866; Chloroclystis oedalea Prout, 1958

Species of moth

Axinoptera infusata is a moth in the family Geometridae. It is found on Borneo.
