= Chloroclystis leucopygata =

Scientific classification
- Domain: Eukaryota
- Kingdom: Animalia
- Phylum: Arthropoda
- Class: Insecta
- Order: Lepidoptera
- Family: Geometridae
- Genus: Chloroclystis
- Species: C. leucopygata

Binomial name
- Chloroclystis leucopygata Warren, 1896

Species of moth

Chloroclystis leucopygata is a moth in the family Geometridae. It is found in Sulawesi as well as in India.

It has a wingspan of about 30 millimetres (1.2 in). The forewings are red-brown, suffused in parts with fuscous. The hindwings are similar to the forewings, but the submarginal line is whiter.

== Subspecies ==
- Chloroclystis leucopygata leucopygata (India)
- Chloroclystis leucopygata cata Prout, 1958 (Sulawesi)
