= Axinoptera ruficosta =

Scientific classification
- Kingdom: Animalia
- Phylum: Arthropoda
- Clade: Pancrustacea
- Class: Insecta
- Order: Lepidoptera
- Family: Geometridae
- Genus: Axinoptera
- Species: A. ruficosta

Binomial name
- Axinoptera ruficosta Holloway, 1997

Species of moth

Axinoptera ruficosta is a moth in the family Geometridae. It is found on Borneo. The habitat consists of lower and upper montane forests.

The length of the forewings is about 6 mm for males and 7 mm for females.
