= Chloroclystis decimana =

Scientific classification
- Kingdom: Animalia
- Phylum: Arthropoda
- Clade: Pancrustacea
- Class: Insecta
- Order: Lepidoptera
- Family: Geometridae
- Genus: Chloroclystis
- Species: C. decimana

Binomial name
- Chloroclystis decimana Vojnits, 1994

Species of moth

Chloroclystis decimana is a moth in the family Geometridae. It is found in the Afrotropical realm.
