= Chloroclystis ruptiscripta =

Scientific classification
- Kingdom: Animalia
- Phylum: Arthropoda
- Class: Insecta
- Order: Lepidoptera
- Family: Geometridae
- Genus: Chloroclystis
- Species: C. ruptiscripta

Binomial name
- Chloroclystis ruptiscripta (Warren, 1904)

Synonyms
- Rhinoprora ruptiscripta Warren, 1904; Syncosmia colorata Warren, 1906

Species of moth

Chloroclystis ruptiscripta is a moth in the family Geometridae. It was described by Warren in 1904. It is found on the Philippines (Luzon) and in New Guinea.

The wingspan is 21–23 millimetres (0.83–0.91 in). The forewings are pale green with brownish markings, edged or varied with fuscous.
