= Chloroclystis gerberae =

Scientific classification
- Kingdom: Animalia
- Phylum: Arthropoda
- Clade: Pancrustacea
- Class: Insecta
- Order: Lepidoptera
- Family: Geometridae
- Genus: Chloroclystis
- Species: C. gerberae

Binomial name
- Chloroclystis gerberae Herbulot, 1964

Species of moth

Chloroclystis gerberae is a species of moth of the family Geometridae. It is found in the Seychelles on the island of Mahé.
