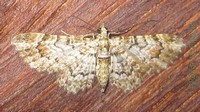

Scientific classification
- Kingdom: Animalia
- Phylum: Arthropoda
- Clade: Pancrustacea
- Class: Insecta
- Order: Lepidoptera
- Family: Geometridae
- Genus: Chloroclystis
- Species: C. angelica

Binomial name
- Chloroclystis angelica Herbulot, 1968

= Chloroclystis angelica =

Species of moth

Chloroclystis angelica is a species of moth of the family Geometridae. It is found in La Réunion.
