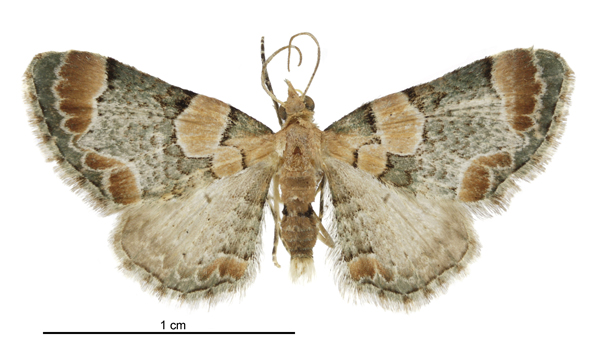
- Male specimen
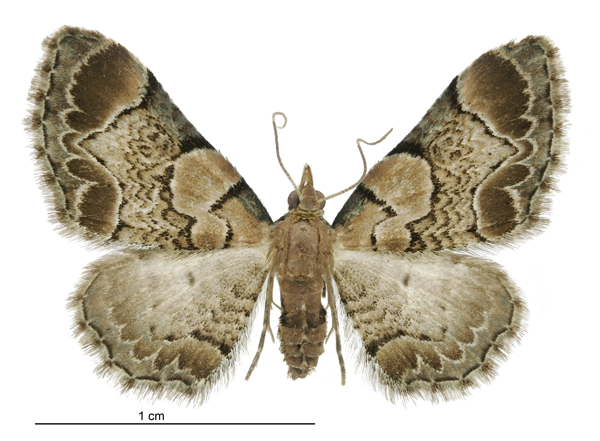
- Female specimen

Scientific classification
- Kingdom: Animalia
- Phylum: Arthropoda
- Clade: Pancrustacea
- Class: Insecta
- Order: Lepidoptera
- Family: Geometridae
- Genus: Chloroclystis
- Species: C. lichenodes

Binomial name
- Chloroclystis lichenodes (Purdie, 1887)

Synonyms
- Pasiphila lichenodes Purdie, 1887

= Chloroclystis lichenodes =

Species of moth

Chloroclystis lichenodes is a moth in the family Geometridae. It is endemic to New Zealand, where it has been recorded from the North Island, the South Island and Stewart Island. The habitat consists of forests.

The forewings are dull green with a large pale brown area near the base, divided into three distinct patches by fine black lines. The central area of the wing is mottled with black, pale brown and dull green. There is a broad, irregular band of chocolate-brown near the termen. The hindwings are dull greenish-brown with several irregular black and white transverse lines and small patches of chocolate-brown. Adults are on wing from November to February.

Adults have been observed resting with outspread wings on lichen-covered tree-trunks.

C. lichenodes was first described by Alex Purdie in 1887.
