= Chloroclystis athaumasta =

Scientific classification
- Domain: Eukaryota
- Kingdom: Animalia
- Phylum: Arthropoda
- Class: Insecta
- Order: Lepidoptera
- Family: Geometridae
- Genus: Chloroclystis
- Species: C. athaumasta

Binomial name
- Chloroclystis athaumasta Turner, 1908

Species of moth

Chloroclystis athaumasta is a moth in the family Geometridae. It was described by Turner in 1908. It is found in Australia (Queensland).
