= Chloroclystis roetschkei =

Scientific classification
- Domain: Eukaryota
- Kingdom: Animalia
- Phylum: Arthropoda
- Class: Insecta
- Order: Lepidoptera
- Family: Geometridae
- Genus: Chloroclystis
- Species: C. roetschkei

Binomial name
- Chloroclystis roetschkei Karisch & Hoppe, 2011

Species of moth

Chloroclystis roetschkei is a moth in the family Geometridae first described by Timm Karisch and Henri Hoppe in 2011. It is found in Equatorial Guinea on Bioko, an island off the Atlantic coast.
