= Chloroclystis nigrilineata =

Scientific classification
- Domain: Eukaryota
- Kingdom: Animalia
- Phylum: Arthropoda
- Class: Insecta
- Order: Lepidoptera
- Family: Geometridae
- Genus: Chloroclystis
- Species: C. nigrilineata

Binomial name
- Chloroclystis nigrilineata Warren, 1898

Species of moth

Chloroclystis nigrilineata is a moth in the family Geometridae. It was described by Warren in 1898. It is found in Australia (Queensland).
