= Chloroclystis papillosa =

Scientific classification
- Domain: Eukaryota
- Kingdom: Animalia
- Phylum: Arthropoda
- Class: Insecta
- Order: Lepidoptera
- Family: Geometridae
- Genus: Chloroclystis
- Species: C. papillosa

Binomial name
- Chloroclystis papillosa (Warren, 1896)

Synonyms
- Aetheolepis papillosa Warren, 1896

Species of moth

Chloroclystis papillosa is a moth in the family Geometridae. It was described by Warren in 1896. It is found in the north-eastern Himalayas.
