= Chloroclystis celidota =

Scientific classification
- Domain: Eukaryota
- Kingdom: Animalia
- Phylum: Arthropoda
- Class: Insecta
- Order: Lepidoptera
- Family: Geometridae
- Genus: Chloroclystis
- Species: C. celidota

Binomial name
- Chloroclystis celidota Turner, 1931

Species of moth

Chloroclystis celidota is a moth in the family Geometridae. It was described by Turner in 1931. It is found in Australia (Queensland) and on Dunk Island.
