= Chloroclystis ambundata =

Scientific classification
- Kingdom: Animalia
- Phylum: Arthropoda
- Clade: Pancrustacea
- Class: Insecta
- Order: Lepidoptera
- Family: Geometridae
- Genus: Chloroclystis
- Species: C. ambundata

Binomial name
- Chloroclystis ambundata Prout, 1929

Species of moth

Chloroclystis ambundata is a moth in the family Geometridae. It is found on the Marquesas Archipelago.
