= Chloroclystis tridentata =

Scientific classification
- Domain: Eukaryota
- Kingdom: Animalia
- Phylum: Arthropoda
- Class: Insecta
- Order: Lepidoptera
- Family: Geometridae
- Genus: Chloroclystis
- Species: C. tridentata

Binomial name
- Chloroclystis tridentata D. S. Fletcher, 1958

Species of moth

Chloroclystis tridentata is a moth in the family Geometridae. It was described by David Stephen Fletcher in 1958 and it is endemic to Uganda.
