= Chloroclystis invisibilis =

Scientific classification
- Kingdom: Animalia
- Phylum: Arthropoda
- Clade: Pancrustacea
- Class: Insecta
- Order: Lepidoptera
- Family: Geometridae
- Genus: Chloroclystis
- Species: C. invisibilis

Binomial name
- Chloroclystis invisibilis Warren, 1907

Synonyms
- Chloroclystis invita Prout, 1958

Species of moth

Chloroclystis invisibilis is a moth in the family Geometridae. It is found on Sulawesi.
