= Chloroclystis zhuoxinensis =

Scientific classification
- Kingdom: Animalia
- Phylum: Arthropoda
- Class: Insecta
- Order: Lepidoptera
- Family: Geometridae
- Genus: Chloroclystis
- Species: C. zhuoxinensis

Binomial name
- Chloroclystis zhuoxinensis Yang, 1978

Species of moth

Chloroclystis zhuoxinensis is a moth in the family Geometridae. It is endemic to China.
