= Chloroclystis kampalensis =

Scientific classification
- Kingdom: Animalia
- Phylum: Arthropoda
- Clade: Pancrustacea
- Class: Insecta
- Order: Lepidoptera
- Family: Geometridae
- Genus: Chloroclystis
- Species: C. kampalensis

Binomial name
- Chloroclystis kampalensis Prout, 1937

Species of moth

Chloroclystis kampalensis is a moth in the family Geometridae. It is found in Uganda.
