= Chloroclystis consocer =

Scientific classification
- Domain: Eukaryota
- Kingdom: Animalia
- Phylum: Arthropoda
- Class: Insecta
- Order: Lepidoptera
- Family: Geometridae
- Genus: Chloroclystis
- Species: C. consocer

Binomial name
- Chloroclystis consocer Prout, 1937

Species of moth

Chloroclystis consocer is a moth in the family Geometridae. It is found on the Comoros and in Kenya, Malawi, South Africa and Tanzania.

The larvae feed on Vachellia xanthophloea.
