= Axinoptera curviscapulis =

Scientific classification
- Kingdom: Animalia
- Phylum: Arthropoda
- Clade: Pancrustacea
- Class: Insecta
- Order: Lepidoptera
- Family: Geometridae
- Genus: Axinoptera
- Species: A. curviscapulis

Binomial name
- Axinoptera curviscapulis (Prout, 1958)

Synonyms
- Chloroclystis curviscapulis Prout, 1958

Species of moth

Axinoptera curviscapulis is a moth in the family Geometridae occurring in the north-eastern Himalayas.
