= Chloroclystis rectaria =

Scientific classification
- Kingdom: Animalia
- Phylum: Arthropoda
- Class: Insecta
- Order: Lepidoptera
- Family: Geometridae
- Genus: Chloroclystis
- Species: C. rectaria

Binomial name
- Chloroclystis rectaria Hampson, 1903

Species of moth

Chloroclystis rectaria is a moth in the family Geometridae. It was described by George Hampson in 1903. It is endemic to Sri Lanka.
