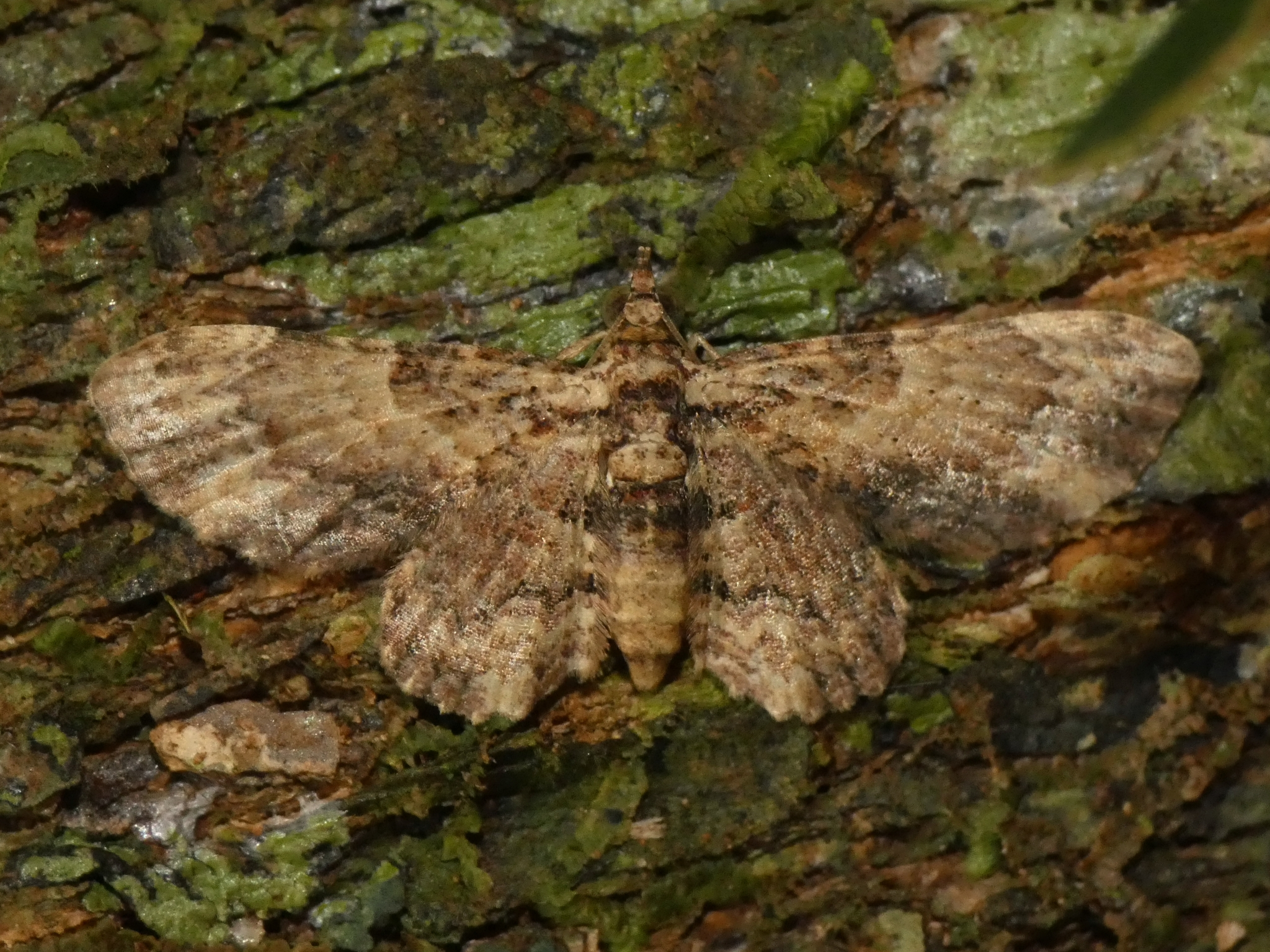

Scientific classification
- Kingdom: Animalia
- Phylum: Arthropoda
- Clade: Pancrustacea
- Class: Insecta
- Order: Lepidoptera
- Family: Geometridae
- Genus: Chloroclystis
- Species: C. phoenochyta

Binomial name
- Chloroclystis phoenochyta Turner, 1922

= Chloroclystis phoenochyta =

Species of moth

Chloroclystis phoenochyta is a species of moth in the family Geometridae. It was first described by Turner in 1922. It is found in Australia (Queensland).
