= Chloroclystis atroviridis =

Scientific classification
- Domain: Eukaryota
- Kingdom: Animalia
- Phylum: Arthropoda
- Class: Insecta
- Order: Lepidoptera
- Family: Geometridae
- Genus: Chloroclystis
- Species: C. atroviridis

Binomial name
- Chloroclystis atroviridis (Warren, 1893)

Synonyms
- Eupithecia atroviridis Warren, 1893

Species of moth

Chloroclystis atroviridis is a moth in the family Geometridae. It was described by William Warren in 1893. It is found in India and Sri Lanka.

The wingspan is about 20 millimetres (0.79 in). Adults are pale green, suffused with pale rufous. The forewings have indistinct blackish basal and antemedial bands with waved edges. The hindwings are whitish, with ochreous tufts.

== Subspecies ==
- Chloroclystis atroviridis atroviridis (India: Naga Hills)
- Chloroclystis atroviridis perspecta Prout, 1958 (Sri Lanka)
