= Chloroclystis pitoi =

Scientific classification
- Domain: Eukaryota
- Kingdom: Animalia
- Phylum: Arthropoda
- Class: Insecta
- Order: Lepidoptera
- Family: Geometridae
- Genus: Chloroclystis
- Species: C. pitoi

Binomial name
- Chloroclystis pitoi Clarke, 1971

Species of moth

Chloroclystis pitoi is a moth in the family Geometridae. It is found on Rapa Island.
