= Chloroclystis rufofasciata =

Scientific classification
- Domain: Eukaryota
- Kingdom: Animalia
- Phylum: Arthropoda
- Class: Insecta
- Order: Lepidoptera
- Family: Geometridae
- Genus: Chloroclystis
- Species: C. rufofasciata

Binomial name
- Chloroclystis rufofasciata (Rothschild, 1913)

Synonyms
- Manoba rufofasciata Rothschild, 1913

Species of moth

Chloroclystis rufofasciata is a moth in the family Geometridae. It is found in New Guinea.
