= Chloroclystis coloptila =

Scientific classification
- Domain: Eukaryota
- Kingdom: Animalia
- Phylum: Arthropoda
- Class: Insecta
- Order: Lepidoptera
- Family: Geometridae
- Genus: Chloroclystis
- Species: C. coloptila

Binomial name
- Chloroclystis coloptila Prout, 1929

Species of moth

Chloroclystis coloptila is a moth in the family Geometridae. It is found in the Marquesas Archipelago where it occurs on several islands (Nuku Hiva, Eiao, Ua Pou, and Hiva Oa) from low altitudes to 1,210 m (3,960 ft) above sea level.

== Description ==
The species is 13–17 mm (0.51–0.67 in) long and have coneless face which is V-shaped and is black in colour. Pedipalp is 2 mm (0.079 in) long and is longer in females then in males.
