= Chloroclystis flaviornata =

Scientific classification
- Kingdom: Animalia
- Phylum: Arthropoda
- Clade: Pancrustacea
- Class: Insecta
- Order: Lepidoptera
- Family: Geometridae
- Genus: Chloroclystis
- Species: C. flaviornata

Binomial name
- Chloroclystis flaviornata Prout, 1937

Species of moth

Chloroclystis flaviornata is a moth in the family Geometridae. It is found in the Democratic Republic of the Congo (it was described from the Marungu highlands).
