= Chloroclystis sordida =

Scientific classification
- Domain: Eukaryota
- Kingdom: Animalia
- Phylum: Arthropoda
- Class: Insecta
- Order: Lepidoptera
- Family: Geometridae
- Genus: Chloroclystis
- Species: C. sordida

Binomial name
- Chloroclystis sordida (Warren, 1903)

Synonyms
- Aniserpetes sordida Warren, 1903

Species of moth

Chloroclystis sordida is a moth in the family Geometridae. It was described by Warren in 1903. It is endemic to New Guinea.
