= Chloroclystis comorana =

Scientific classification
- Kingdom: Animalia
- Phylum: Arthropoda
- Clade: Pancrustacea
- Class: Insecta
- Order: Lepidoptera
- Family: Geometridae
- Genus: Chloroclystis
- Species: C. comorana

Binomial name
- Chloroclystis comorana Herbulot, 1978

Species of moth

Chloroclystis comorana is a species of moth of the family Geometridae. It is found in the Comoros.
