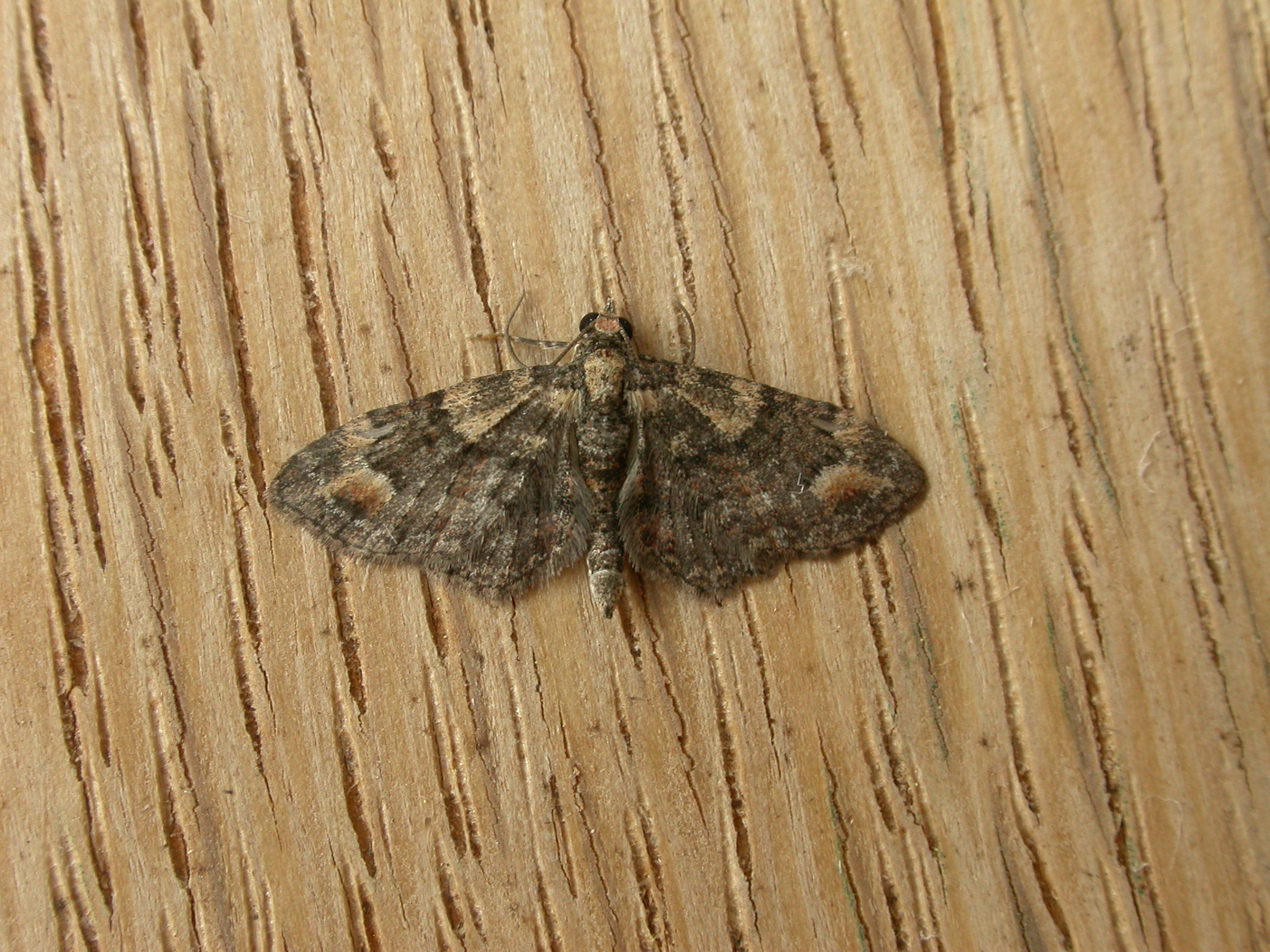

Scientific classification
- Domain: Eukaryota
- Kingdom: Animalia
- Phylum: Arthropoda
- Class: Insecta
- Order: Lepidoptera
- Family: Geometridae
- Genus: Chloroclystis
- Species: C. pallidiplaga

Binomial name
- Chloroclystis pallidiplaga (Warren, 1898)

Synonyms
- Rhinoprora pallidiplaga Warren, 1898

= Chloroclystis pallidiplaga =

Species of moth

Chloroclystis pallidiplaga, the white-shouldered pug, is a moth of the family Geometridae. It is endemic to Australia.

== Description ==
This moth is typical of the genus, featuring a mottled brown pattern with cross lines. In most specimens white patches occur at the forewing tip, and at the wing shoulder, hence the species epithet pallidiplaga ("pale area"). In the most well marked specimens white colouration extends onto the first half of the abdomen as well. Duller specimens are similar to other genus members, and may not be separable without dissection.
