= Chloroclystis androgyna =

Scientific classification
- Kingdom: Animalia
- Phylum: Arthropoda
- Clade: Pancrustacea
- Class: Insecta
- Order: Lepidoptera
- Family: Geometridae
- Genus: Chloroclystis
- Species: C. androgyna

Binomial name
- Chloroclystis androgyna Herbulot, 1957

Species of moth

Chloroclystis androgyna is a species of moth of the family Geometridae. It is found in La Réunion.
