= Chloroclystis mariae =

Scientific classification
- Domain: Eukaryota
- Kingdom: Animalia
- Phylum: Arthropoda
- Class: Insecta
- Order: Lepidoptera
- Family: Geometridae
- Genus: Chloroclystis
- Species: C. mariae

Binomial name
- Chloroclystis mariae Robinson, 1975

Species of moth

Chloroclystis mariae is a moth in the family Geometridae. It is found on Fiji.
