= Chloroclystis conversa =

Scientific classification
- Kingdom: Animalia
- Phylum: Arthropoda
- Clade: Pancrustacea
- Class: Insecta
- Order: Lepidoptera
- Family: Geometridae
- Genus: Chloroclystis
- Species: C. conversa

Binomial name
- Chloroclystis conversa (Warren, 1897)

Synonyms
- Simotricha conversa Warren, 1897

Species of moth

Chloroclystis conversa is a moth in the family Geometridae. It is found in the north-eastern Himalayas.
