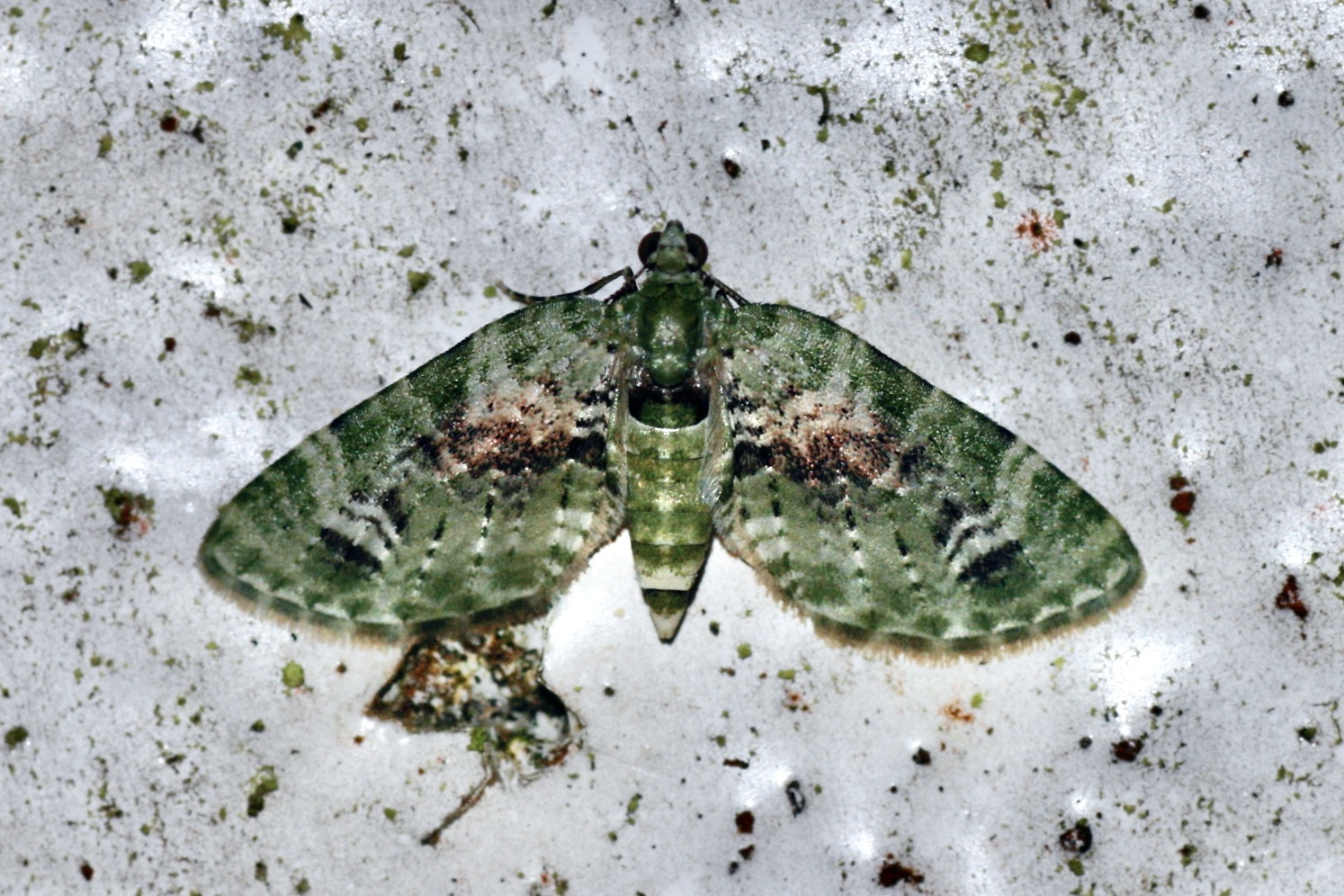
- Chloroclystis semiscripta ssp. brychoma from Peninsular Malaysia

Scientific classification
- Kingdom: Animalia
- Phylum: Arthropoda
- Class: Insecta
- Order: Lepidoptera
- Family: Geometridae
- Genus: Chloroclystis
- Species: C. semiscripta

Binomial name
- Chloroclystis semiscripta Warren, 1906

Synonyms
- Chloroclystis novaguineana Bethune-Baker, 1915

= Chloroclystis semiscripta =

Species of moth

Chloroclystis semiscripta is a moth in the family Geometridae. It is found in New Guinea and on Sulawesi, Borneo and Peninsular Malaysia. The habitat consists of lower and upper montane areas.

== Subspecies ==
- Chloroclystis semiscripta semiscripta (New Guinea)
- Chloroclystis semiscripta brychoma Prout, 1958 (Sulawesi, Borneo, Peninsular Malaysia)
