= Chloroclystis gymnoscelides =

Scientific classification
- Kingdom: Animalia
- Phylum: Arthropoda
- Clade: Pancrustacea
- Class: Insecta
- Order: Lepidoptera
- Family: Geometridae
- Genus: Chloroclystis
- Species: C. gymnoscelides

Binomial name
- Chloroclystis gymnoscelides Prout, 1916

Species of moth

Chloroclystis gymnoscelides is a moth in the family Geometridae. It is found in South Africa.
