= Chloroclystis inops =

Scientific classification
- Kingdom: Animalia
- Phylum: Arthropoda
- Clade: Pancrustacea
- Class: Insecta
- Order: Lepidoptera
- Family: Geometridae
- Genus: Chloroclystis
- Species: C. inops

Binomial name
- Chloroclystis inops (Warren, 1898)

Synonyms
- Gymnoscelis inops Warren 1898

Species of moth

Chloroclystis inops is a moth in the family Geometridae. It is found on Kay Island.
