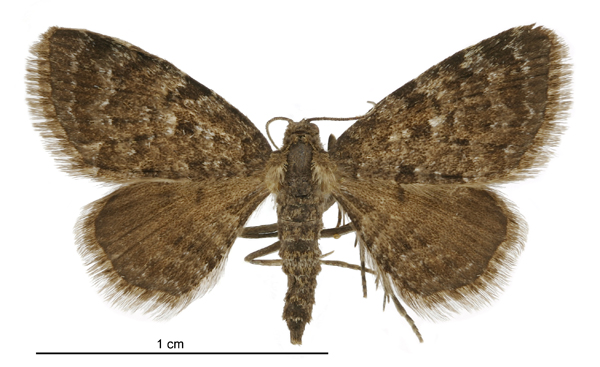
- Male specimen
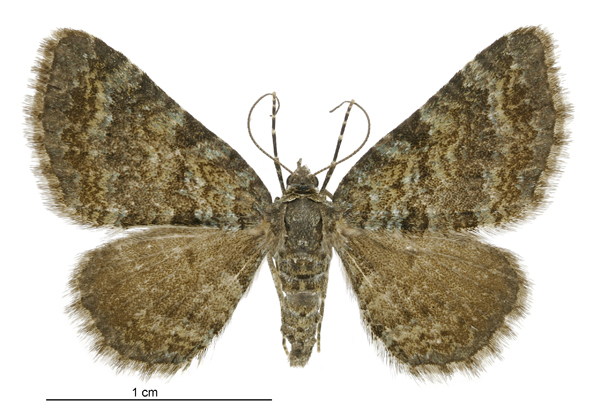
- Female specimen

Scientific classification
- Kingdom: Animalia
- Phylum: Arthropoda
- Class: Insecta
- Order: Lepidoptera
- Family: Geometridae
- Genus: Chloroclystis
- Species: C. nereis

Binomial name
- Chloroclystis nereis (Meyrick, 1888)

Synonyms
- Pasiphila nereis Meyrick, 1888; Chloroclystis ida Hudson, 1939; Chloroclystis minima Hudson, 1905 (preocc.)

= Chloroclystis nereis =

Species of moth

Chloroclystis nereis is a moth in the family Geometridae. It was described by Edward Meyrick in 1888. It is endemic to New Zealand.

== Taxonomy ==
This species was first described by Edward Meyrick in 1888 and was originally named Pasiphila nereis. George Hudson discussed this species under the name Chloroclystis nereis in his 1928 book The butterflies and moths of New Zealand.

== Description ==
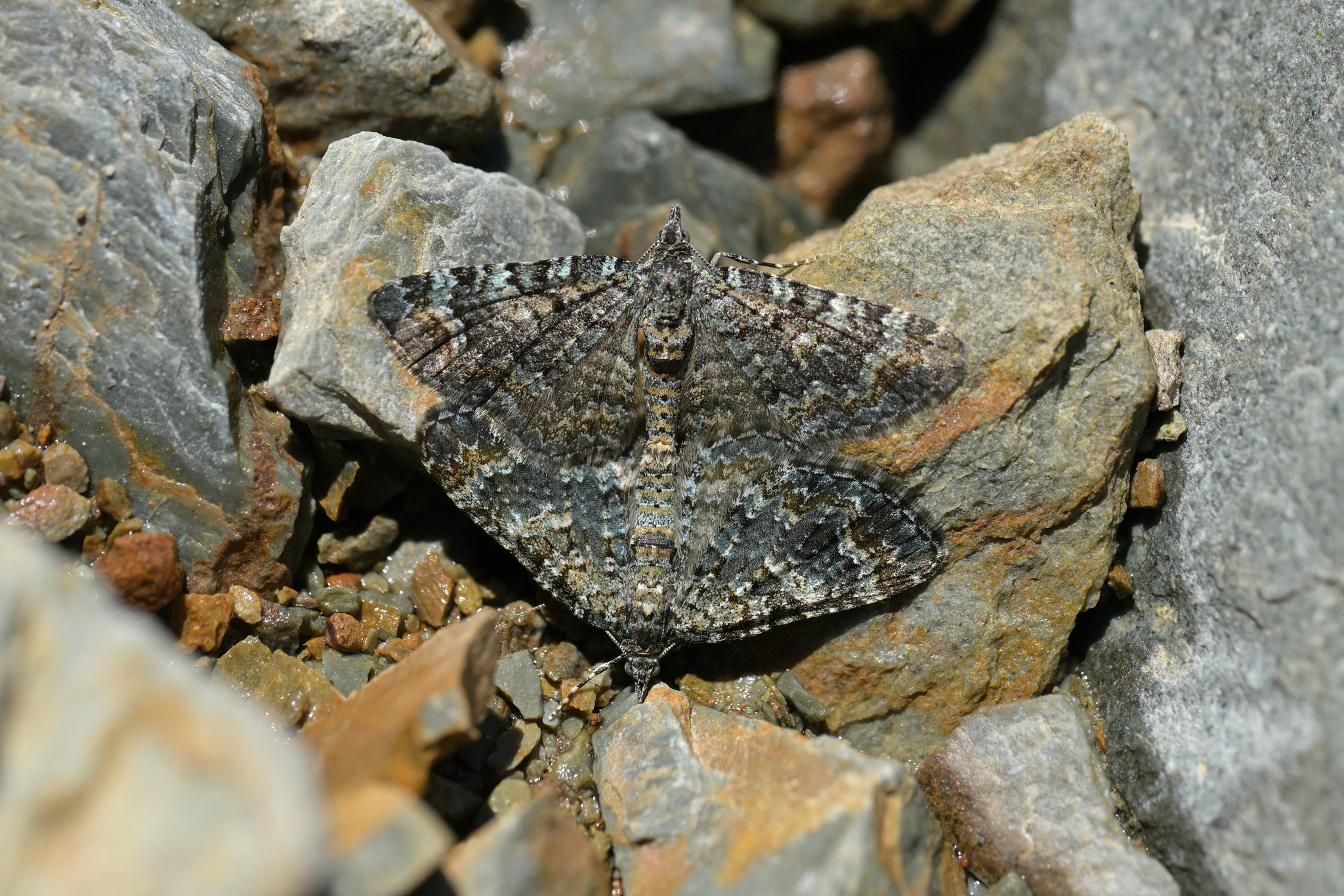
Male and female C. nereis mating.

Meyrick described this species as follows:

Male, female. — 15-21 mm. Head, palpi, thorax, and abdomen grey sprinkled with blackish-grey and whitish, sides of thorax and base of abdomen (in fresh specimens) tinged with blue-greenish; palpi 2. Antennae whitish annulated with black, ciliations in male 1/2. Legs blackish, middle and posterior pair irrorated with whitish, apex of all joints whitish. Forewings with hindmargin bowed, oblique, slightly sinuate above anal angle; light grey, suffused with light blue-greenish (in fresh specimens); numerous curved waved darker grey or blackish-grey lines, alternating with a partial irregular white irroration; anterior edge of median band from 1/3 of costa to 1/3 of inner margin, curved; posterior edge from 2/3 of costa to 2/3 of inner margin, sinuate inwards beneath costa, and above and below middle; median band towards margins, and a hindmarginal band interrupted beneath costa, obscurely suffused with darker grey, especially near costa; a grey discal spot, sometimes obsolete; an interrupted blackish hindmarginal line : cilia whitish, barred with grey, and with an obscure grey line, bars darker on basal half. Hindwings with hindmargin unevenly rounded; grey, with obscure darker waved lines, more distinct towards inner margin, and somewhat irrorated with white in intervals; an obscure dark grey discal spot, often merged in one of the lines; cilia as hi forewings, but more obscure.

== Distribution ==
This species is endemic to New Zealand.

== Habitat and hosts ==
The favoured habitat of this species consists of mountainous areas. The larvae feed inside the flower heads of Celmisia lindsayi. Adult moths have been shown to pollinate Celmisia discolor, Celmisia gracilenta and Helichrysum selago.

== Behaviour ==
C. nereis is day flying. Adults are on wing in January and February.
