= Chloroclystis embolocosma =

Scientific classification
- Kingdom: Animalia
- Phylum: Arthropoda
- Clade: Pancrustacea
- Class: Insecta
- Order: Lepidoptera
- Family: Geometridae
- Genus: Chloroclystis
- Species: C. embolocosma

Binomial name
- Chloroclystis embolocosma Turner, 1936

Species of moth

Chloroclystis embolocosma is a species of moth in the family Geometridae. It is found in Australia (Queensland).
