= Chloroclystis senex =

Scientific classification
- Domain: Eukaryota
- Kingdom: Animalia
- Phylum: Arthropoda
- Class: Insecta
- Order: Lepidoptera
- Family: Geometridae
- Genus: Chloroclystis
- Species: C. senex

Binomial name
- Chloroclystis senex Debauche, 1938

Species of moth

Chloroclystis senex is a moth in the family Geometridae. It is found in the Democratic Republic of Congo and Uganda.
