= Chloroclystis actephilae =

Scientific classification
- Kingdom: Animalia
- Phylum: Arthropoda
- Clade: Pancrustacea
- Class: Insecta
- Order: Lepidoptera
- Family: Geometridae
- Genus: Chloroclystis
- Species: C. actephilae

Binomial name
- Chloroclystis actephilae Prout, 1958

Species of moth

Chloroclystis actephilae is a moth in the family Geometridae. It is found in southern India.
