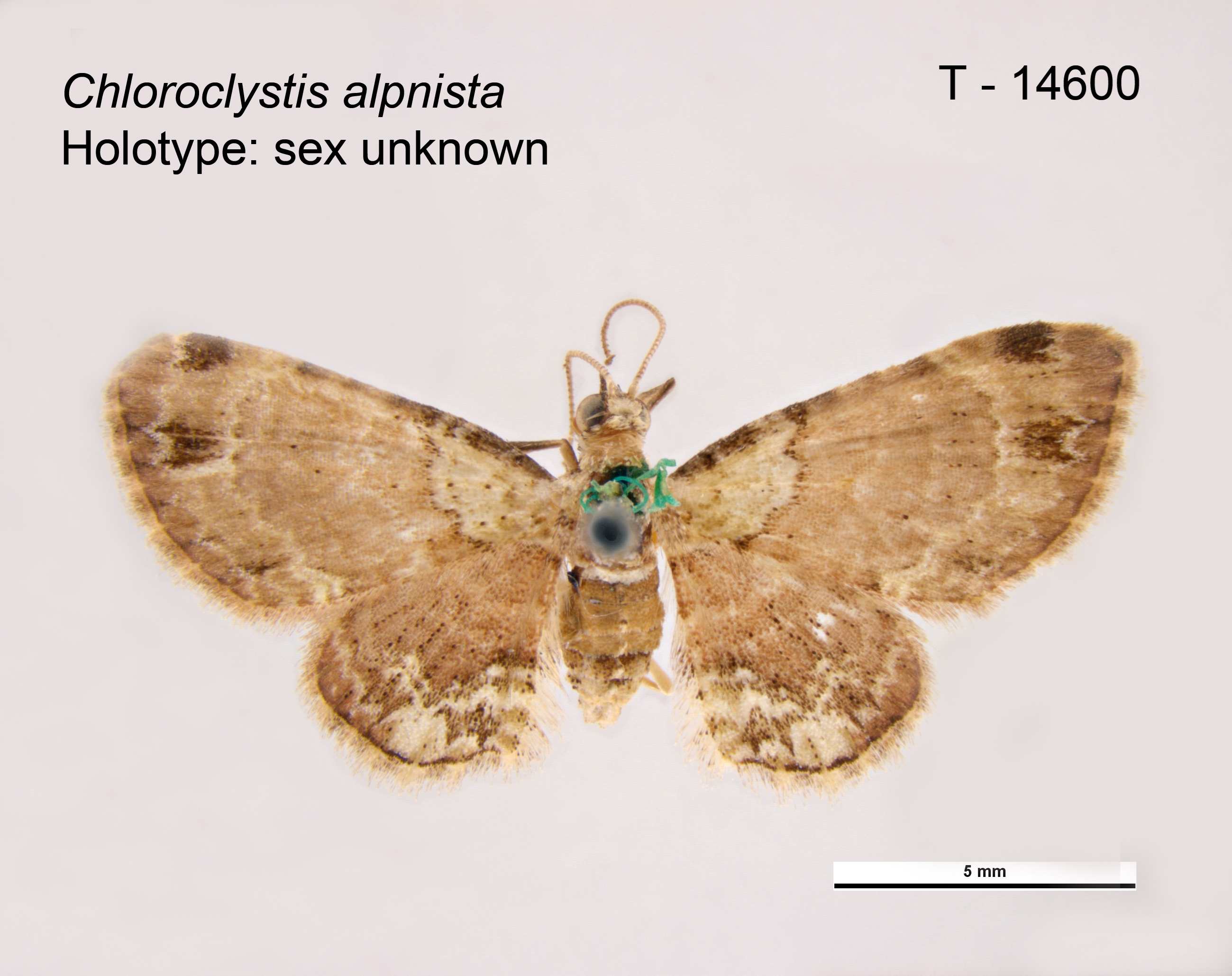
- Holotype specimen

Scientific classification
- Domain: Eukaryota
- Kingdom: Animalia
- Phylum: Arthropoda
- Class: Insecta
- Order: Lepidoptera
- Family: Geometridae
- Genus: Chloroclystis
- Species: C. alpnista

Binomial name
- Chloroclystis alpnista Turner, 1907

= Chloroclystis alpnista =

Species of moth

Chloroclystis alpnista is a moth in the family Geometridae. It is found in Australia (Queensland). Subspecies eupora was described from Bali.

== Subspecies ==
- Chloroclystis alpnista alpnista (Queensland)
- Chloroclystis alpnista eupora Prout, 1958 (Bali)
