= Chloroclystis hypotmeta =

Scientific classification
- Domain: Eukaryota
- Kingdom: Animalia
- Phylum: Arthropoda
- Class: Insecta
- Order: Lepidoptera
- Family: Geometridae
- Genus: Chloroclystis
- Species: C. hypotmeta

Binomial name
- Chloroclystis hypotmeta Prout, 1934

Species of moth

Chloroclystis hypotmeta is a moth in the family Geometridae. It was described by Louis Beethoven Prout in 1934. It is found in Fiji (Viti Levu, Vanua Levu) and New Hebrides.
