= Axinoptera penataran =

Scientific classification
- Kingdom: Animalia
- Phylum: Arthropoda
- Clade: Pancrustacea
- Class: Insecta
- Order: Lepidoptera
- Family: Geometridae
- Genus: Axinoptera
- Species: A. penataran

Binomial name
- Axinoptera penataran Holloway, 1997

Species of moth

Axinoptera penataran is a moth in the family Geometridae. It is found on Borneo.

The length of the forewings is about 9 mm for males and 7–10 mm for females. The ground colour of the wings is pale orange-brown with blackish fasciation.
