= Chloroclystis autopepla =

Scientific classification
- Kingdom: Animalia
- Phylum: Arthropoda
- Clade: Pancrustacea
- Class: Insecta
- Order: Lepidoptera
- Family: Geometridae
- Genus: Chloroclystis
- Species: C. autopepla

Binomial name
- Chloroclystis autopepla Prout, 1958

Species of moth

Chloroclystis autopepla is a moth in the family Geometridae. It is found on New Guinea.
