= Chloroclystis permixta =

Scientific classification
- Kingdom: Animalia
- Phylum: Arthropoda
- Clade: Pancrustacea
- Class: Insecta
- Order: Lepidoptera
- Family: Geometridae
- Genus: Chloroclystis
- Species: C. permixta

Binomial name
- Chloroclystis permixta Prout, 1958

Species of moth

Chloroclystis permixta is a moth in the family Geometridae. It was described by Prout in 1958. It is found on Java.
