= Chloroclystis grisea =

Scientific classification
- Kingdom: Animalia
- Phylum: Arthropoda
- Clade: Pancrustacea
- Class: Insecta
- Order: Lepidoptera
- Family: Geometridae
- Genus: Chloroclystis
- Species: C. grisea

Binomial name
- Chloroclystis grisea Warren, 1897

Synonyms
- Chloroclystis dietzei Bastelberger, 1907; Chloroclystis leighi Prout, 1937

Species of moth

Chloroclystis grisea is a moth in the family Geometridae. It is found in Comoros, Kenya Mozambique and South Africa.

Host-plant of this species is Phyllanthus niruri
