= Chloroclystis velutina =

Scientific classification
- Domain: Eukaryota
- Kingdom: Animalia
- Phylum: Arthropoda
- Class: Insecta
- Order: Lepidoptera
- Family: Geometridae
- Genus: Chloroclystis
- Species: C. velutina

Binomial name
- Chloroclystis velutina (Warren, 1897)

Synonyms
- Chloroplintha velutina Warren, 1897

Species of moth

Chloroclystis velutina is a moth in the family Geometridae. It was described by Warren in 1897. It is found on Sulawesi.
