= Chloroclystis rubrinotata =

Scientific classification
- Domain: Eukaryota
- Kingdom: Animalia
- Phylum: Arthropoda
- Class: Insecta
- Order: Lepidoptera
- Family: Geometridae
- Genus: Chloroclystis
- Species: C. rubrinotata

Binomial name
- Chloroclystis rubrinotata (Warren, 1893)

Synonyms
- Eupithecia rubrinotata Warren, 1893

Species of moth

Chloroclystis rubrinotata is a moth in the family Geometridae. It was described by William Warren in 1893. It is endemic to India.

The wingspan is about 24 millimetres (0.94 in). Adults are green with traces of waved lines on the wings. The forewings have a slight subbasal line and a large rufous quadrate patch on the costal area, bounded on the inner side by an oblique black line, and on outer side by a black line. The hindwings have three indistinct lines on the basal half and a series of prominent black specks on the postmedial line.
