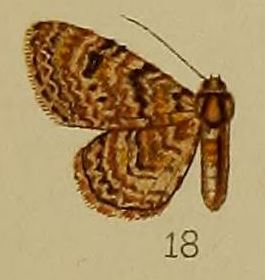

Scientific classification
- Kingdom: Animalia
- Phylum: Arthropoda
- Class: Insecta
- Order: Lepidoptera
- Family: Geometridae
- Genus: Chloroclystis
- Species: C. polygraphata

Binomial name
- Chloroclystis polygraphata Hampson, 1912

= Chloroclystis polygraphata =

Species of moth

Chloroclystis polygraphata is a moth in the family Geometridae. It was described by George Hampson in 1912. It is endemic to Sri Lanka.
