= Chloroclystis elaeopa =

Scientific classification
- Domain: Eukaryota
- Kingdom: Animalia
- Phylum: Arthropoda
- Class: Insecta
- Order: Lepidoptera
- Family: Geometridae
- Genus: Chloroclystis
- Species: C. elaeopa

Binomial name
- Chloroclystis elaeopa Turner, 1908

Species of moth

Chloroclystis elaeopa is a moth in the family Geometridae. It was described by Alfred Jefferis Turner in 1908. It is found in Queensland, Australia.

Adults have brown patterned wings. There is a dark mark near the centre of the forewing.
