= Chloroclystis bosora =

Scientific classification
- Domain: Eukaryota
- Kingdom: Animalia
- Phylum: Arthropoda
- Class: Insecta
- Order: Lepidoptera
- Family: Geometridae
- Genus: Chloroclystis
- Species: C. bosora

Binomial name
- Chloroclystis bosora (H. Druce, 1888)

Synonyms
- Larentia bosora H. Druce, 1888

Species of moth

Chloroclystis bosora is a moth in the family Geometridae. It was described by Herbert Druce in 1888. It is found on Fiji and the New Hebrides.
