= Chloroclystis solidifascia =

Scientific classification
- Kingdom: Animalia
- Phylum: Arthropoda
- Clade: Pancrustacea
- Class: Insecta
- Order: Lepidoptera
- Family: Geometridae
- Genus: Chloroclystis
- Species: C. solidifascia

Binomial name
- Chloroclystis solidifascia Prout, 1929

Species of moth

Chloroclystis solidifascia is a moth in the family Geometridae. It was described by Louis Beethoven Prout in 1939. It is found on Seram.
