= Chloroclystis annimasi =

Scientific classification
- Kingdom: Animalia
- Phylum: Arthropoda
- Class: Insecta
- Order: Lepidoptera
- Family: Geometridae
- Genus: Chloroclystis
- Species: C. annimasi

Binomial name
- Chloroclystis annimasi Wiltshire, 1982

Species of moth

Chloroclystis annimasi is a moth in the family Geometridae. It is endemic to Saudi Arabia.
