= Chloroclystis cryptolopha =

Scientific classification
- Kingdom: Animalia
- Phylum: Arthropoda
- Clade: Pancrustacea
- Class: Insecta
- Order: Lepidoptera
- Family: Geometridae
- Genus: Chloroclystis
- Species: C. cryptolopha

Binomial name
- Chloroclystis cryptolopha Prout, 1932

Species of moth

Chloroclystis cryptolopha is a moth in the family Geometridae. It is found in Tanzania.
