= Chloroclystis neoconversa =

Scientific classification
- Kingdom: Animalia
- Phylum: Arthropoda
- Class: Insecta
- Order: Lepidoptera
- Family: Geometridae
- Genus: Chloroclystis
- Species: C. neoconversa

Binomial name
- Chloroclystis neoconversa Inoue, 1971

Species of moth

Chloroclystis neoconversa is a moth in the family Geometridae. It is found on the Ryukyu Islands.
