= Chloroclystis viridata =

Scientific classification
- Domain: Eukaryota
- Kingdom: Animalia
- Phylum: Arthropoda
- Class: Insecta
- Order: Lepidoptera
- Family: Geometridae
- Genus: Chloroclystis
- Species: C. viridata

Binomial name
- Chloroclystis viridata (Warren, 1895)

Synonyms
- Rhinoprora viridata Warren, 1895; Pasiphila viridata

Species of moth

Chloroclystis viridata is a moth in the family Geometridae. It was described by Warren in 1895. It is found on Peninsular Malaysia and from Sulawesi to New Guinea.

== Subspecies ==
- Chloroclystis viridata viridata (Peninsular Malaysia)
- Chloroclystis viridata phaeina Prout, 1958 (Sulawesi to New Guinea)
