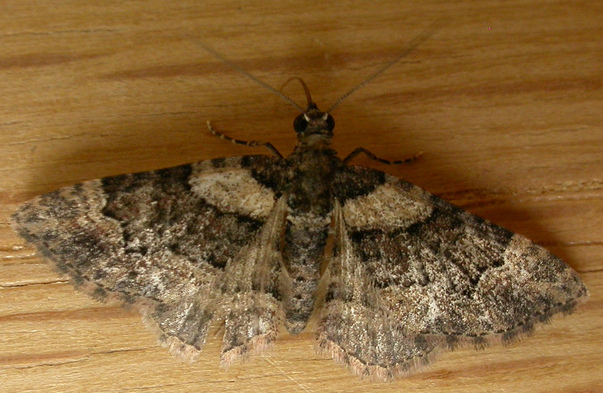

Scientific classification
- Kingdom: Animalia
- Phylum: Arthropoda
- Clade: Pancrustacea
- Class: Insecta
- Order: Lepidoptera
- Family: Geometridae
- Genus: Chloroclystis
- Species: C. metallospora

Binomial name
- Chloroclystis metallospora Turner, 1904

= Chloroclystis metallospora =

Species of moth

Chloroclystis metallospora is a species of moth of the family Geometridae. It is found in Australia.
