= Chloroclystis spissidentata =

Scientific classification
- Domain: Eukaryota
- Kingdom: Animalia
- Phylum: Arthropoda
- Class: Insecta
- Order: Lepidoptera
- Family: Geometridae
- Genus: Chloroclystis
- Species: C. spissidentata

Binomial name
- Chloroclystis spissidentata (Warren, 1893)

Synonyms
- Iramba spissidentata Warren, 1893

Species of moth

Chloroclystis spissidentata is a moth in the family Geometridae. It was described by William Warren in 1893. It is found in Sikkim, India.

The wingspan is about 18 millimetres (0.71 in). Adults are fuscous, thickly speckled with small ochreous white spots. There are numerous indistinct waved lines on the wings.
