= Chloroclystis infrazebrina =

Scientific classification
- Kingdom: Animalia
- Phylum: Arthropoda
- Clade: Pancrustacea
- Class: Insecta
- Order: Lepidoptera
- Family: Geometridae
- Genus: Chloroclystis
- Species: C. infrazebrina

Binomial name
- Chloroclystis infrazebrina Hampson, 1895

Synonyms
- Chloroclystis subtrigalba Swinhoe, 1895

Species of moth

Chloroclystis infrazebrina is a moth in the family Geometridae first described by George Hampson in 1895. It is found in India.

The wingspan is about 18 mm. Adults are pale pinkish brown. The forewings have antemedial, medial and postmedial blackish patches on the costa. The hindwings have a double antemedial black line. The outer area is pinker, with an indistinct submarginal line.
