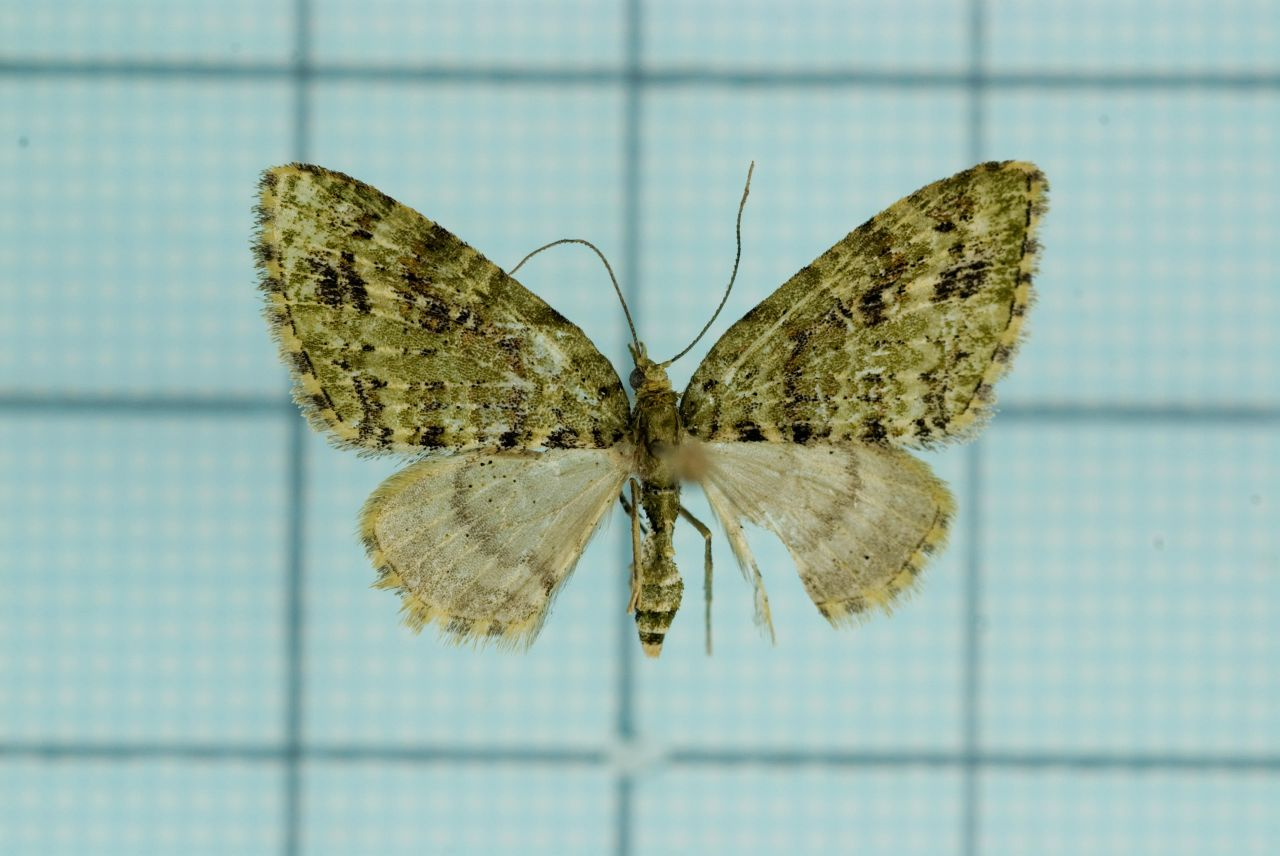

Scientific classification
- Kingdom: Animalia
- Phylum: Arthropoda
- Clade: Pancrustacea
- Class: Insecta
- Order: Lepidoptera
- Family: Geometridae
- Genus: Chloroclystis
- Species: C. blanda

Binomial name
- Chloroclystis blanda (Bastelberger, 1911)

Synonyms
- Oligoclystia blanda Bastelberger, 1911

= Chloroclystis blanda =

Species of moth

Chloroclystis blanda is a moth in the family Geometridae. It was described by Max Bastelberger in 1911. It is endemic to Taiwan.

Chloroclystis blanda is a common species. It occurs in forest areas at low, medium and high elevations, and adults can be observed except during the period of low temperatures in winter.
