= Chloroclystis hypopyrrha =

Scientific classification
- Kingdom: Animalia
- Phylum: Arthropoda
- Clade: Pancrustacea
- Class: Insecta
- Order: Lepidoptera
- Family: Geometridae
- Genus: Chloroclystis
- Species: C. hypopyrrha

Binomial name
- Chloroclystis hypopyrrha West, 1929

Species of moth

Chloroclystis hypopyrrha is a moth in the family Geometridae first described by West in 1929. It is found in Japan.

The wingspan is 16–17 mm.
