= Chloroclystis muscosa =

Scientific classification
- Kingdom: Animalia
- Phylum: Arthropoda
- Clade: Pancrustacea
- Class: Insecta
- Order: Lepidoptera
- Family: Geometridae
- Genus: Chloroclystis
- Species: C. muscosa

Binomial name
- Chloroclystis muscosa (Warren, 1902)

Synonyms
- Gnamptomia muscosa Warren, 1902; Chloroclystis tumefacta Prout, 1917

Species of moth

Chloroclystis muscosa is a moth in the family Geometridae. It is found in Ethiopia, Kenya, Malawi and South Africa.

== Subspecies ==
- Chloroclystis muscosa muscosa
- Chloroclystis muscosa tumefacta Prout, 1917 (Malawi, South Africa)
