= Chloroclystis pauxillula =

Scientific classification
- Domain: Eukaryota
- Kingdom: Animalia
- Phylum: Arthropoda
- Class: Insecta
- Order: Lepidoptera
- Family: Geometridae
- Genus: Chloroclystis
- Species: C. pauxillula

Binomial name
- Chloroclystis pauxillula Turner, 1907

Species of moth

Chloroclystis pauxillula is a moth in the family Geometridae. It is found in Australia (Queensland).
