= Chloroclystis mniochroa =

Scientific classification
- Kingdom: Animalia
- Phylum: Arthropoda
- Clade: Pancrustacea
- Class: Insecta
- Order: Lepidoptera
- Family: Geometridae
- Genus: Chloroclystis
- Species: C. mniochroa

Binomial name
- Chloroclystis mniochroa Turner, 1904

Species of moth

Chloroclystis mniochroa is a moth in the family Geometridae. It is found in Australia (Queensland).

The wingspan is about 20 mm. Adults have brown patterned wings.
