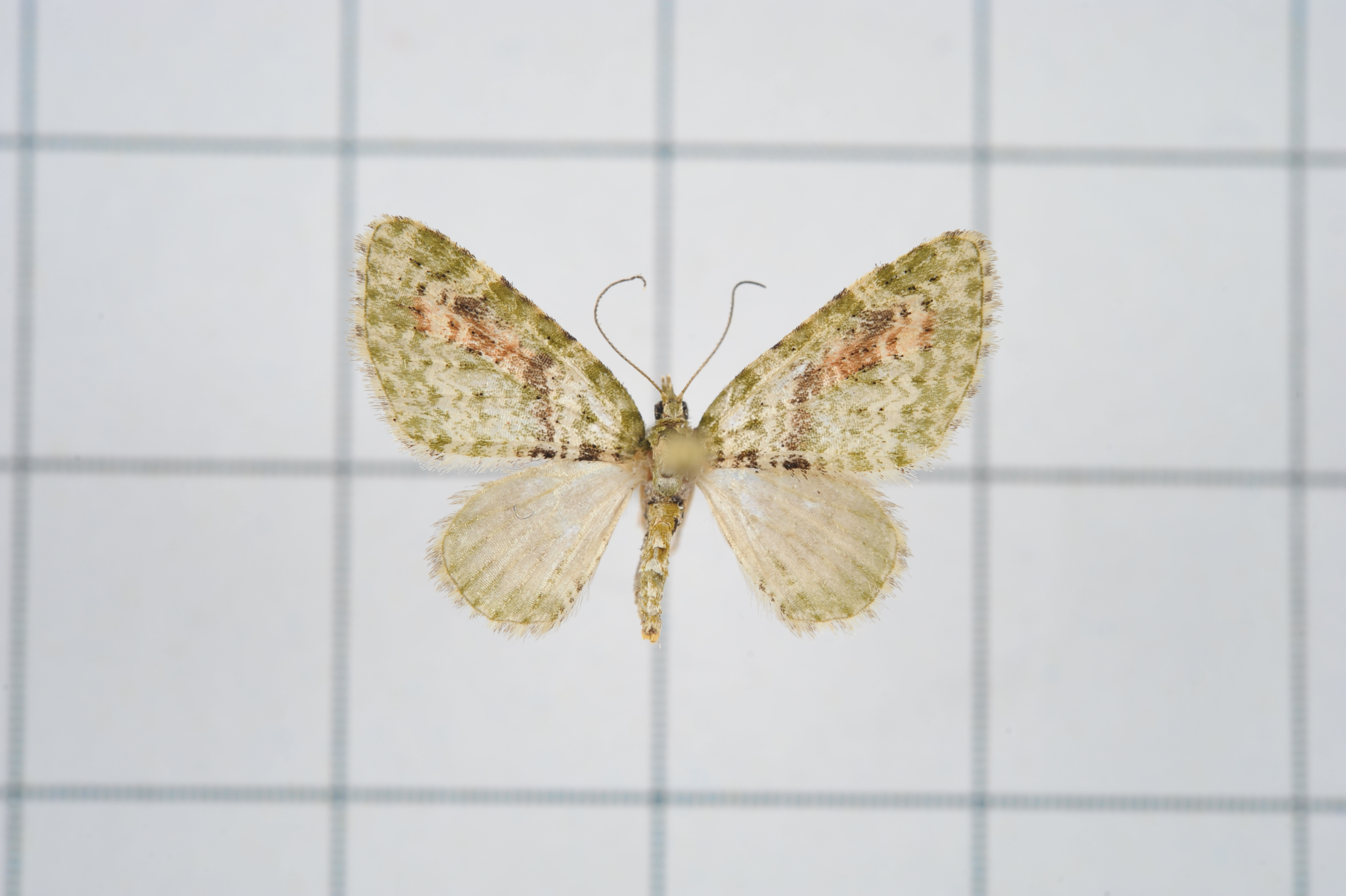

Scientific classification
- Domain: Eukaryota
- Kingdom: Animalia
- Phylum: Arthropoda
- Class: Insecta
- Order: Lepidoptera
- Family: Geometridae
- Genus: Chloroclystis
- Species: C. rubroviridis

Binomial name
- Chloroclystis rubroviridis (Warren, 1896)

Synonyms
- Gymnopera rubroviridis Warren, 1896

= Chloroclystis rubroviridis =

Species of moth

Chloroclystis rubroviridis is a moth in the family Geometridae. It was described by Warren in 1896. It is found in the north-eastern Himalayas, Burma, Taiwan and on Borneo, Peninsular Malaysia and Java. The habitat consists of upper montane areas.

== Subspecies ==
- Chloroclystis rubroviridis rubroviridis (north-eastern Himalaya, Burma, Taiwan)
- Chloroclystis rubroviridis nubifera Prout, 1932 (Borneo, Peninsular Malaysia, Java)
