= Chloroclystis olivata =

Scientific classification
- Domain: Eukaryota
- Kingdom: Animalia
- Phylum: Arthropoda
- Class: Insecta
- Order: Lepidoptera
- Family: Geometridae
- Genus: Chloroclystis
- Species: C. olivata

Binomial name
- Chloroclystis olivata (Warren, 1901)

Synonyms
- Ardonis olivata Warren, 1901

Species of moth

Chloroclystis olivata is a moth in the family Geometridae. It was described by Warren in 1901. It is found in southern India and Sri Lanka.
