= Chloroclystis fragilis =

Scientific classification
- Kingdom: Animalia
- Phylum: Arthropoda
- Clade: Pancrustacea
- Class: Insecta
- Order: Lepidoptera
- Family: Geometridae
- Genus: Chloroclystis
- Species: C. fragilis

Binomial name
- Chloroclystis fragilis Warren, 1899

Species of moth

Chloroclystis fragilis is a moth in the family Geometridae. It is found in New Guinea (it was described from Saint Aignan Island).
