= Axinoptera turgidata =

Scientific classification
- Kingdom: Animalia
- Phylum: Arthropoda
- Class: Insecta
- Order: Lepidoptera
- Family: Geometridae
- Genus: Axinoptera
- Species: A. turgidata

Binomial name
- Axinoptera turgidata (Walker, 1866)

Synonyms
- Bosara turgidata Walker, 1866

Species of moth

Axinoptera turgidata is a moth in the family Geometridae. It is found on Borneo and Peninsular Malaysia.

The wings are a uniform grey with a pale spot on the hindwing margin.
