= Chloroclystis horistes =

Scientific classification
- Kingdom: Animalia
- Phylum: Arthropoda
- Clade: Pancrustacea
- Class: Insecta
- Order: Lepidoptera
- Family: Geometridae
- Genus: Chloroclystis
- Species: C. horistes

Binomial name
- Chloroclystis horistes Prout, 1958

Species of moth

Chloroclystis horistes is a moth in the family Geometridae. It is found in Nepal.
