= Chloroclystis rubicunda =

Scientific classification
- Kingdom: Animalia
- Phylum: Arthropoda
- Clade: Pancrustacea
- Class: Insecta
- Order: Lepidoptera
- Family: Geometridae
- Genus: Chloroclystis
- Species: C. rubicunda

Binomial name
- Chloroclystis rubicunda Prout, 1934

Species of moth

Chloroclystis rubicunda is a moth in the family Geometridae. It is endemic to Fiji.
