= Chloroclystis obturgescens =

Scientific classification
- Kingdom: Animalia
- Phylum: Arthropoda
- Clade: Pancrustacea
- Class: Insecta
- Order: Lepidoptera
- Family: Geometridae
- Genus: Chloroclystis
- Species: C. obturgescens

Binomial name
- Chloroclystis obturgescens Prout, 1926

Species of moth

Chloroclystis obturgescens is a moth in the family Geometridae. It was described by Prout in 1926. It is endemic to Borneo. The habitat consists of montane areas at altitudes between 1,500 and 2,600 metres (8,500 ft).
