= Chloroclystis catoglypta =

Scientific classification
- Kingdom: Animalia
- Phylum: Arthropoda
- Clade: Pancrustacea
- Class: Insecta
- Order: Lepidoptera
- Family: Geometridae
- Genus: Chloroclystis
- Species: C. catoglypta

Binomial name
- Chloroclystis catoglypta Prout, 1927

Species of moth

Chloroclystis catoglypta is a moth in the family Geometridae. It is found on São Tomé.
