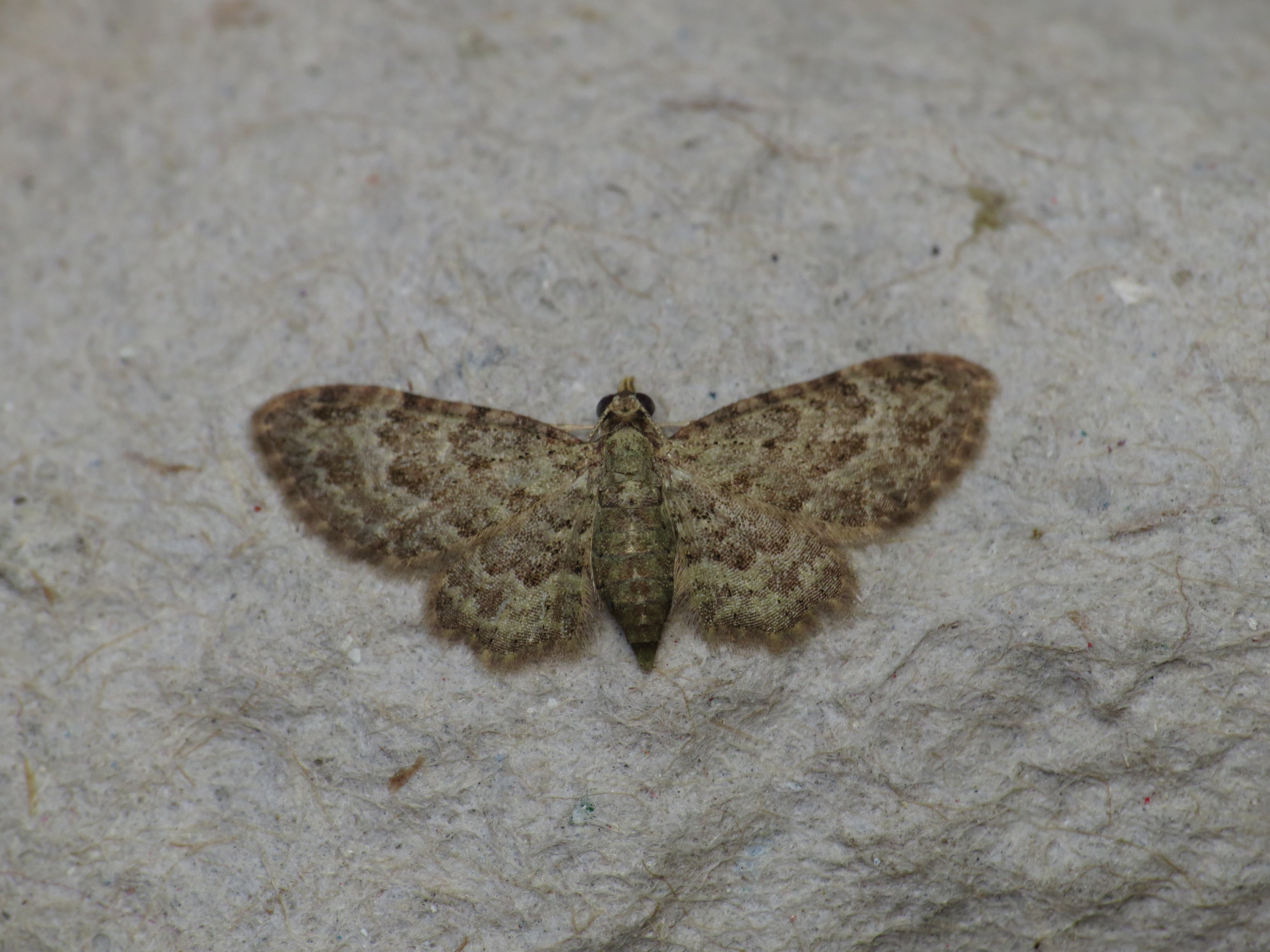

Scientific classification
- Kingdom: Animalia
- Phylum: Arthropoda
- Clade: Pancrustacea
- Class: Insecta
- Order: Lepidoptera
- Family: Geometridae
- Genus: Chloroclystis
- Species: C. catastreptes

Binomial name
- Chloroclystis catastreptes (Meyrick, 1891)

Synonyms
- Phrissogonus catastreptes Meyrick, 1891

= Chloroclystis catastreptes =

Species of moth

Chloroclystis catastreptes, the green and brown carpet, is a moth in the family Geometridae. It was described by Edward Meyrick in 1891. It is found in Australia (Queensland, New South Wales, Victoria, Tasmania, South Australia, and Western Australia).

The wingspan is about 2 cm (0.79 in). The larvae probably feed on wattles (Acacia spp.).
