= Chloroclystis guttifera =

Scientific classification
- Domain: Eukaryota
- Kingdom: Animalia
- Phylum: Arthropoda
- Class: Insecta
- Order: Lepidoptera
- Family: Geometridae
- Genus: Chloroclystis
- Species: C. guttifera

Binomial name
- Chloroclystis guttifera Turner, 1904

Species of moth

Chloroclystis guttifera is a moth in the family Geometridae. It was described by Turner in 1904. It is found in Australia (Queensland).
