= Axinoptera orphnobathra =

Scientific classification
- Kingdom: Animalia
- Phylum: Arthropoda
- Clade: Pancrustacea
- Class: Insecta
- Order: Lepidoptera
- Family: Geometridae
- Genus: Axinoptera
- Species: A. orphnobathra

Binomial name
- Axinoptera orphnobathra (Prout, 1958)

Synonyms
- Chloroclystis orphnobathra Prout, 1958

Species of moth

Axinoptera orphnobathra is a moth in the family Geometridae. It is found on Borneo and Peninsular Malaysia.
