= Chloroclystis cuneilinea =

Scientific classification
- Kingdom: Animalia
- Phylum: Arthropoda
- Clade: Pancrustacea
- Class: Insecta
- Order: Lepidoptera
- Family: Geometridae
- Genus: Chloroclystis
- Species: C. cuneilinea

Binomial name
- Chloroclystis cuneilinea Warren, 1906

Species of moth

Chloroclystis cuneilinea is a moth in the family Geometridae. It is found in New Guinea.
