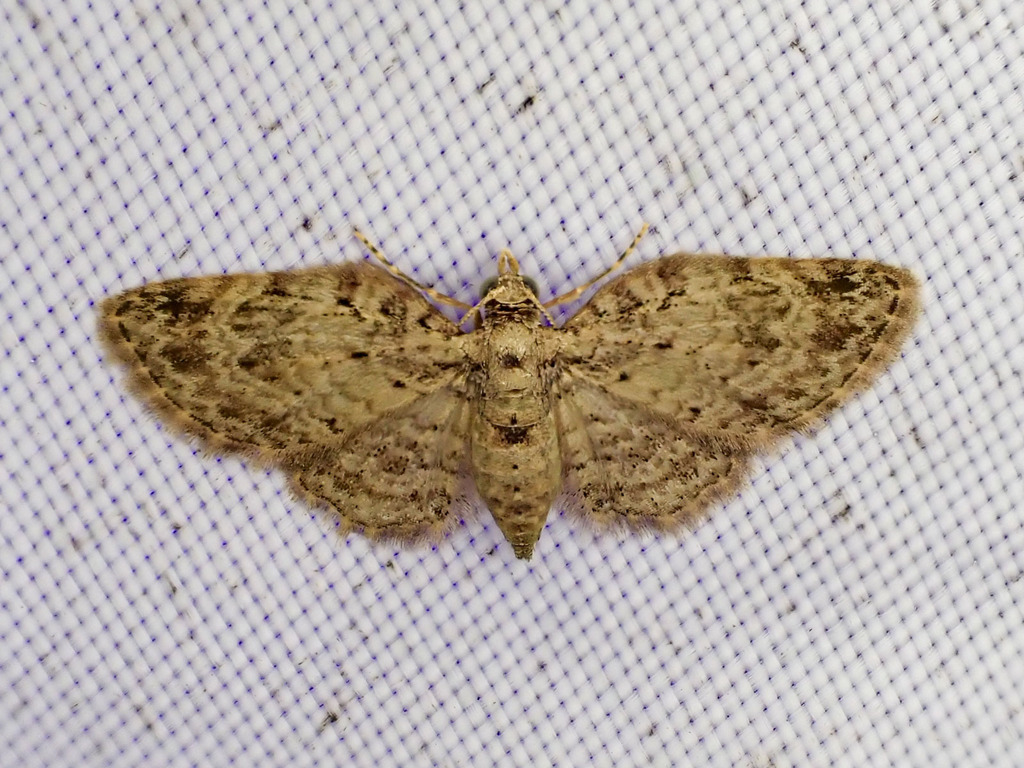

Scientific classification
- Kingdom: Animalia
- Phylum: Arthropoda
- Clade: Pancrustacea
- Class: Insecta
- Order: Lepidoptera
- Family: Geometridae
- Genus: Chloroclystis
- Species: C. pyrrholopha

Binomial name
- Chloroclystis pyrrholopha Turner, 1907

Synonyms
- Chloroclystis eurylopha Turner, 1922

= Chloroclystis pyrrholopha =

Species of moth

Chloroclystis pyrrholopha is a moth in the family Geometridae. It is found in Australia (Queensland).
