= Chloroclystis sierraria =

Scientific classification
- Kingdom: Animalia
- Phylum: Arthropoda
- Class: Insecta
- Order: Lepidoptera
- Family: Geometridae
- Genus: Chloroclystis
- Species: C. sierraria

Binomial name
- Chloroclystis sierraria C. Swinhoe, 1904

Synonyms
- Chloroclystis insignifica Bethune-Baker, 1913

Species of moth

Chloroclystis sierraria is a moth in the family Geometridae. It was described by Charles Swinhoe in 1904. It is found in Sierra Leone, Yemen and Angola.
