= Chloroclystis viridigrisea =

Scientific classification
- Kingdom: Animalia
- Phylum: Arthropoda
- Clade: Pancrustacea
- Class: Insecta
- Order: Lepidoptera
- Family: Geometridae
- Genus: Chloroclystis
- Species: C. viridigrisea

Binomial name
- Chloroclystis viridigrisea Prout, 1937

Species of moth

Chloroclystis viridigrisea is a moth in the family Geometridae. It was described by Prout in 1937. It is endemic to São Tomé.
