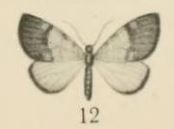

Scientific classification
- Kingdom: Animalia
- Phylum: Arthropoda
- Class: Insecta
- Order: Lepidoptera
- Family: Geometridae
- Genus: Chloroclystis
- Species: C. ericinellae

Binomial name
- Chloroclystis ericinellae (Aurivillius, 1910)

Synonyms
- Hydrelia ericinellae Aurivillius, 1910

= Chloroclystis ericinellae =

Species of moth

Chloroclystis ericinellae is a moth in the family Geometridae. It is endemic to Tanzania.
