= Chloroclystis hawkinsi =

Scientific classification
- Kingdom: Animalia
- Phylum: Arthropoda
- Class: Insecta
- Order: Lepidoptera
- Family: Geometridae
- Genus: Chloroclystis
- Species: C. hawkinsi

Binomial name
- Chloroclystis hawkinsi Wiltshire, 1982

Species of moth

Chloroclystis hawkinsi is a moth in the family Geometridae. It is endemic to South Africa.
