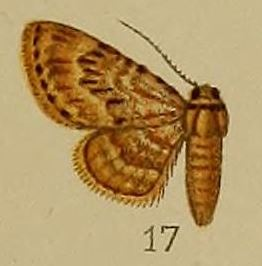
- Chloroclystis dentatissima

Scientific classification
- Domain: Eukaryota
- Kingdom: Animalia
- Phylum: Arthropoda
- Class: Insecta
- Order: Lepidoptera
- Family: Geometridae
- Genus: Chloroclystis
- Species: C. dentatissima

Binomial name
- Chloroclystis dentatissima Warren, 1898

= Chloroclystis dentatissima =

Species of moth

Chloroclystis dentatissima is a moth in the family Geometridae. It is found in South Africa, on the Kei Islands (Indonesia), in Sri Lanka and the Cocos (Keeling) Islands.
