= Chloroclystis pyrsodonta =

Scientific classification
- Domain: Eukaryota
- Kingdom: Animalia
- Phylum: Arthropoda
- Class: Insecta
- Order: Lepidoptera
- Family: Geometridae
- Genus: Chloroclystis
- Species: C. pyrsodonta

Binomial name
- Chloroclystis pyrsodonta Turner, 1922

Species of moth

Chloroclystis pyrsodonta is a moth in the family Geometridae. It was described by Turner in 1922. It is found in Australia (Queensland). It has also been recorded from Fiji.
