= Chloroclystis thermastobrita =

Scientific classification
- Domain: Eukaryota
- Kingdom: Animalia
- Phylum: Arthropoda
- Class: Insecta
- Order: Lepidoptera
- Family: Geometridae
- Genus: Chloroclystis
- Species: C. thermastobrita

Binomial name
- Chloroclystis thermastobrita D. S. Fletcher, 1958

Species of moth

Chloroclystis thermastobrita is a moth in the family Geometridae. It was described by David Stephen Fletcher in 1958. It is found in Tanzania.
