= Chloroclystis schoenei =

Scientific classification
- Domain: Eukaryota
- Kingdom: Animalia
- Phylum: Arthropoda
- Class: Insecta
- Order: Lepidoptera
- Family: Geometridae
- Genus: Chloroclystis
- Species: C. schoenei

Binomial name
- Chloroclystis schoenei Karisch, 2008

Species of moth

Chloroclystis schoenei is a moth in the family Geometridae. It is found in the Kakamega forest in Kenya.
