= Chloroclystis macroaedeagus =

Scientific classification
- Kingdom: Animalia
- Phylum: Arthropoda
- Clade: Pancrustacea
- Class: Insecta
- Order: Lepidoptera
- Family: Geometridae
- Genus: Chloroclystis
- Species: C. macroaedeagus

Binomial name
- Chloroclystis macroaedeagus Holloway, 1979

Species of moth

Chloroclystis macroaedeagus is a moth in the family Geometridae. It is found on New Caledonia.
