= Chloroclystis taxata =

Scientific classification
- Domain: Eukaryota
- Kingdom: Animalia
- Phylum: Arthropoda
- Class: Insecta
- Order: Lepidoptera
- Family: Geometridae
- Genus: Chloroclystis
- Species: C. taxata

Binomial name
- Chloroclystis taxata Herbulot, 1981

Species of moth

Chloroclystis taxata is a moth in the family Geometridae. It is found on the Comoros.
