= Chloroclystis analyta =

Scientific classification
- Kingdom: Animalia
- Phylum: Arthropoda
- Clade: Pancrustacea
- Class: Insecta
- Order: Lepidoptera
- Family: Geometridae
- Genus: Chloroclystis
- Species: C. analyta

Binomial name
- Chloroclystis analyta Prout, 1928

Species of moth

Chloroclystis analyta is a moth in the family Geometridae. It is found on Sumatra. The species is 23 millimetres (0.91 in) long.
