= Chloroclystis primivernalis =

Scientific classification
- Kingdom: Animalia
- Phylum: Arthropoda
- Class: Insecta
- Order: Lepidoptera
- Family: Geometridae
- Genus: Chloroclystis
- Species: C. primivernalis

Binomial name
- Chloroclystis primivernalis Warren, 1907

Species of moth

Chloroclystis primivernalis is a moth in the family Geometridae first described by William Warren in 1907. It is endemic to Indonesia.
