= Chloroclystis mokensis =

Scientific classification
- Kingdom: Animalia
- Phylum: Arthropoda
- Clade: Pancrustacea
- Class: Insecta
- Order: Lepidoptera
- Family: Geometridae
- Genus: Chloroclystis
- Species: C. mokensis

Binomial name
- Chloroclystis mokensis Prout, 1937

Species of moth

Chloroclystis mokensis is a moth in the family Geometridae. It is found in Equatorial Guinea (Bioko) and on the Seychelles (Mahé).
