= Axinoptera anticostalis =

Scientific classification
- Kingdom: Animalia
- Phylum: Arthropoda
- Clade: Pancrustacea
- Class: Insecta
- Order: Lepidoptera
- Family: Geometridae
- Genus: Axinoptera
- Species: A. anticostalis

Binomial name
- Axinoptera anticostalis Galsworthy, 1999

Species of moth

Axinoptera anticostalis is a moth in the family Geometridae. It is found in Hong Kong, southern China, Taiwan, the Ryukyu Islands, mainland Japan, north-eastern India, and Bhutan.

The length of the forewings is about 7 mm (0.28 in) for both males and females. The ground colour of the wings is grey. The larvae possibly feed on Glochidion species.
