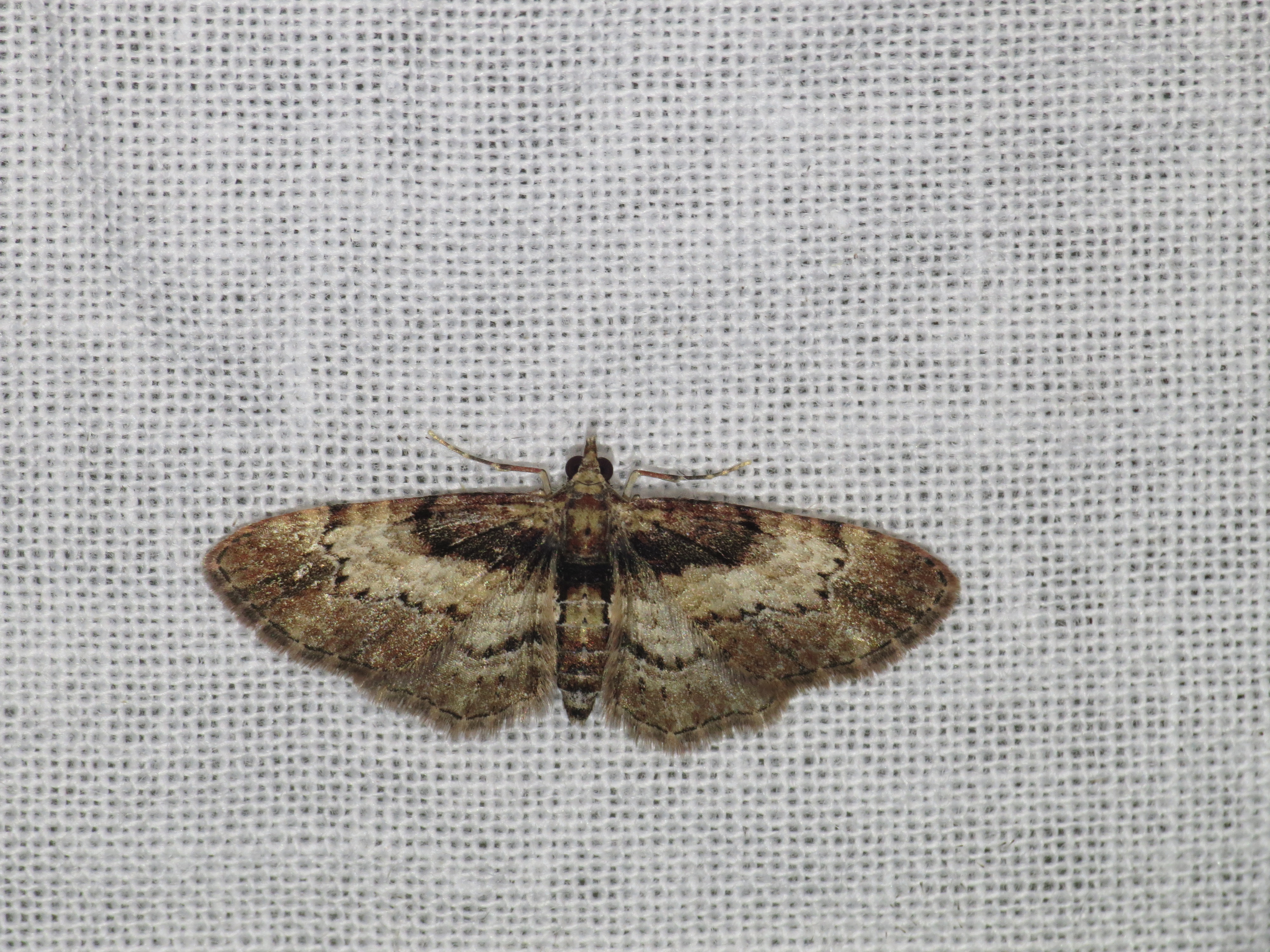

Scientific classification
- Kingdom: Animalia
- Phylum: Arthropoda
- Clade: Pancrustacea
- Class: Insecta
- Order: Lepidoptera
- Family: Geometridae
- Genus: Chloroclystis
- Species: C. approximata

Binomial name
- Chloroclystis approximata (Walker, 1869)

Synonyms
- Larentia approximata Walker, 1869; Phrissogonus pyretodes Meyrick, 1891

= Chloroclystis approximata =

Species of moth

Chloroclystis approximata, the plumed looper or cherry looper, is a moth in the family Geometridae. It was described by Francis Walker in 1869. It is found in Australia (Queensland, New South Wales, Victoria, and Tasmania).

The wingspan is about 3 cm (1.2 in). The larvae feed on flowers and young fruit of cherries (Prunus avium) and flowers and buds of apples (Malus domestica) and various wattles (Acacia spp.).
