= Axinoptera subcostalis =

Scientific classification
- Kingdom: Animalia
- Phylum: Arthropoda
- Class: Insecta
- Order: Lepidoptera
- Family: Geometridae
- Genus: Axinoptera
- Species: A. subcostalis

Binomial name
- Axinoptera subcostalis Hampson, 1893

Synonyms
- Chloroclystis subcostalis

Species of moth

Axinoptera subcostalis is a moth in the family Geometridae. It was first described by George Hampson in 1893 and is found in Sri Lanka.

== Description ==
The wingspan is about 20 mm. Male with a tuft of black hair on hind tibia just before the terminal spurs. Forewings with bent costa upwards and highly angled close to the base, a fold on upperside from the angle of costa to near apex, containing rough rufous scales. Vein 7 from the angle of cell, which is short, where the posterior wall of areole being absent. Adults are olive brown, the wings slightly irrorated (sprinkled) with black and with traces of numerous waved lines. Palpi black. Metathorax and abdomen with black markings. Forewings with black at base of costa. A dentate black antemedial line can be seen. A prominent postmedial line angled at vein 4, and with black streaks beyond it inside the waved grey submarginal line. The sub-costal fold found in male, which is bright rufous. Hindwings suffused with rufous to the prominent curved slightly sinuous black postmedial line. A diffused waved black submarginal line found with white spot beyond it at middle.
