= Chloroclystis boarmica =

Scientific classification
- Kingdom: Animalia
- Phylum: Arthropoda
- Clade: Pancrustacea
- Class: Insecta
- Order: Lepidoptera
- Family: Geometridae
- Genus: Chloroclystis
- Species: C. boarmica

Binomial name
- Chloroclystis boarmica Prout, 1958

Species of moth

Chloroclystis boarmica is a moth in the family Geometridae. It is found on Sumatra.
