= Chloroclystis elaiachroma =

Scientific classification
- Kingdom: Animalia
- Phylum: Arthropoda
- Clade: Pancrustacea
- Class: Insecta
- Order: Lepidoptera
- Family: Geometridae
- Genus: Chloroclystis
- Species: C. elaiachroma

Binomial name
- Chloroclystis elaiachroma Bastelberger, 1908

Synonyms
- Eupithecia aquanivaria E. D. Jones, 1921

Species of moth

Chloroclystis elaiachroma is a moth in the family Geometridae. It is found in Bolivia and Brazil.
