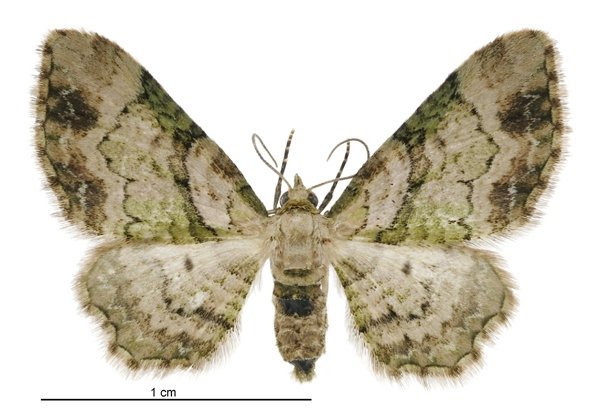
- Female specimen

Scientific classification
- Kingdom: Animalia
- Phylum: Arthropoda
- Clade: Pancrustacea
- Class: Insecta
- Order: Lepidoptera
- Family: Geometridae
- Genus: Chloroclystis
- Species: C. sphragitis

Binomial name
- Chloroclystis sphragitis (Meyrick, 1888)

Synonyms
- Pasiphila sphragitis Meyrick, 1888

= Chloroclystis sphragitis =

Species of moth endemic to New Zealand

Chloroclystis sphragitis is a moth in the family Geometridae. However the placement of this species within the genus Chloroclystis is in doubt. This species is therefore also known Chloroclystis (s.l.) sphragitis. This species was first described by Edward Meyrick in 1888. It is endemic to New Zealand where it has been recorded from the North, South and Stewart Islands. This species frequents scrubby forest habitat. The larvae feed on the flowers of species in the genus Muehlenbeckia. They pupate in a rolled up plant leaf. Adults are highly variable in appearance. Adults are on the wing all year round but most commonly occur from September until March.

== Taxonomy ==
C. sphragitis was originally described by Edward Meyrick in 1888 using specimens collected in Wellington and Christchurch in February and named Pasiphila sphragitis. George Hudson discussed and illustrated this species under the name Chloroclystis sphragitis in both his 1898 book New Zealand moths and butterflies (Macro-lepidoptera) and his 1928 book The butterflies and moths of New Zealand. The male lectotype, collected in Christchurch, is held at the Natural History Museum, London.

== Description ==
Adult resting on tree trunk.

Larva.

Meyrick described the adult male of this species as follows:

Male. — 15-18 mm. Head and thorax whitish-ochreous. Palpi 2 1/4, whitish ochreous, sometimes greenish-tinged, and irrorated with black. Antennae light fuscous, ciliations 2/3. Abdomen pale whitish-ochreous, with blackish ante-median and ante-apical bands. Legs blackish, apex of joints whitish-ochreous, posterior pair suffused with pale whitish-ochreous. Forewings with hindmargin bowed, oblique ; whitish, towards costa and inner margin sometimes suffused with light greenish or ochreous-yellowish (latter perhaps faded) ; an ochreous irroration forming numerous faint waved curved lines, those within median band more or less darkened with grey ; costa suffusedly irrorated with blackish-grey from base to 2/3 ; a fine angulated black line near base ; margins of median band marked by fine black lines ; anterior from 3/8 of costa to 1/4 of inner margin, curved ; posterior from 2/3 of costa to 3/4 of inner margin, rather prominently angulated in middle, upper half twice, lower half once, slightly sinuate ; a conspicuous round dark fuscous patch, mixed with black and greenish, on hindmargin above middle, and a lighter and less defined patch above anal angle ; an interrupted black hindmarginal line : cilia grey-whitish, barred with grey, bars darker on basal half. Hindwings with hind-margin unevenly rounded ; whitish, with grey waved lines marked with blackish towards inner margin ; a dark-grey discal spot before middle ; posterior edge of median band prominently angulated ; cilia as in forewings.

Adults are highly variable in appearance. Hudson was of the opinion that the colouring of the adult moth resembles a bird dropping.

Hudson described the larva of this species as follows:

... is about 1/2 inch in length, rather stout, tapering at each end, with all the segments considerably indented and the skin much wrinkled transversely; green; the back of segments 2, 3 and 4 are dull reddish; segments 5, 6, 7, 8 and 9 have a red patch on each side, margined posteriorly and below with dark green; there are five conspicuous creamy-white semicircular dorsal markings, partially edged with dark green, on segments 5 to 9 inclusive; segment 10 is pale green, and the back of the rest of the segments dull reddish.

Hudson pointed out that this colouration causes the larva to almost exactly resemble a short chain of the Muehlenbeckia blossoms. The dark green and creamy-white markings are deceptive and give the larva the appearance of having an irregular shape, whereas its actual shape is practically cylindrical.

== Distribution ==
C. sphragitis is endemic to New Zealand and has been recorded from the North, South and Stewart Islands.

== Habitat and hosts ==
This species frequents scrubby forest habitat. The larvae feed on the flowers of species in the genus Muehlenbeckia.

== Behaviour ==
The mature larvae are sluggish in their habits, mostly remaining concealed amongst the blossoms. When they do walk their bodies often gently sway from side to side. The pupa is enclosed in a rolled leaf. Adults are on the wing all year round but most commonly occur from September until March. At rest adults can be observed with expanded wings on the leaves and stems of shrubs. Although New Zealand entomologist David E. Gaskin expressed doubt over whether with this moth is attracted to light, C. sphragitis has been recorded as being trapped via light traps.
