= Chloroclystis tortuosa =

Scientific classification
- Domain: Eukaryota
- Kingdom: Animalia
- Phylum: Arthropoda
- Class: Insecta
- Order: Lepidoptera
- Family: Geometridae
- Genus: Chloroclystis
- Species: C. tortuosa

Binomial name
- Chloroclystis tortuosa West, 1929

Species of moth

Chloroclystis tortuosa is a moth in the family Geometridae. It is found on the Philippines (Luzon).
