= Chloroclystis perissa =

Scientific classification
- Domain: Eukaryota
- Kingdom: Animalia
- Phylum: Arthropoda
- Class: Insecta
- Order: Lepidoptera
- Family: Geometridae
- Genus: Chloroclystis
- Species: C. perissa

Binomial name
- Chloroclystis perissa Turner, 1908

Species of moth

Chloroclystis perissa is a moth in the family Geometridae. It was described by Turner in 1908. It is found in Australia (Queensland).
