= Chloroclystis laetitia =

Scientific classification
- Domain: Eukaryota
- Kingdom: Animalia
- Phylum: Arthropoda
- Class: Insecta
- Order: Lepidoptera
- Family: Geometridae
- Genus: Chloroclystis
- Species: C. laetitia

Binomial name
- Chloroclystis laetitia Prout, 1937

Species of moth

Chloroclystis laetitia is a moth species in the family Geometridae first described by Louis Beethoven Prout in 1937. It is found on São Tomé Island.
