= Chloroclystis palmaria =

Scientific classification
- Kingdom: Animalia
- Phylum: Arthropoda
- Clade: Pancrustacea
- Class: Insecta
- Order: Lepidoptera
- Family: Geometridae
- Genus: Chloroclystis
- Species: C. palmaria

Binomial name
- Chloroclystis palmaria Prout, 1928

Species of moth

Chloroclystis palmaria is a moth in the family Geometridae first described by Louis Beethoven Prout in 1928. It is found on Sumatra, Java and Peninsular Malaysia.

== Subspecies ==
- Chloroclystis palmaria palmaria
- Chloroclystis palmaria phantastes Prout, 1958
