= Axinoptera fasciata =

Scientific classification
- Kingdom: Animalia
- Phylum: Arthropoda
- Clade: Pancrustacea
- Class: Insecta
- Order: Lepidoptera
- Family: Geometridae
- Genus: Axinoptera
- Species: A. fasciata

Binomial name
- Axinoptera fasciata (Warren, 1906)

Synonyms
- Aniserpetes fasciata Warren, 1906; Chloroclystis fasciata

Species of moth

Axinoptera fasciata is a moth in the family Geometridae. It is found on New Guinea and Seram.
