= Chloroclystis rufitincta =

Scientific classification
- Domain: Eukaryota
- Kingdom: Animalia
- Phylum: Arthropoda
- Class: Insecta
- Order: Lepidoptera
- Family: Geometridae
- Genus: Chloroclystis
- Species: C. rufitincta

Binomial name
- Chloroclystis rufitincta (Warren, 1898)

Synonyms
- Rhinoprora rufitincta Warren, 1898

Species of moth

Chloroclystis rufitincta is a moth in the family Geometridae. It is found on Java.
