= Chloroclystis manusela =

Scientific classification
- Kingdom: Animalia
- Phylum: Arthropoda
- Clade: Pancrustacea
- Class: Insecta
- Order: Lepidoptera
- Family: Geometridae
- Genus: Chloroclystis
- Species: C. manusela

Binomial name
- Chloroclystis manusela Prout, 1929

Species of moth

Chloroclystis manusela is a moth in the family Geometridae. It is found on Seram.
