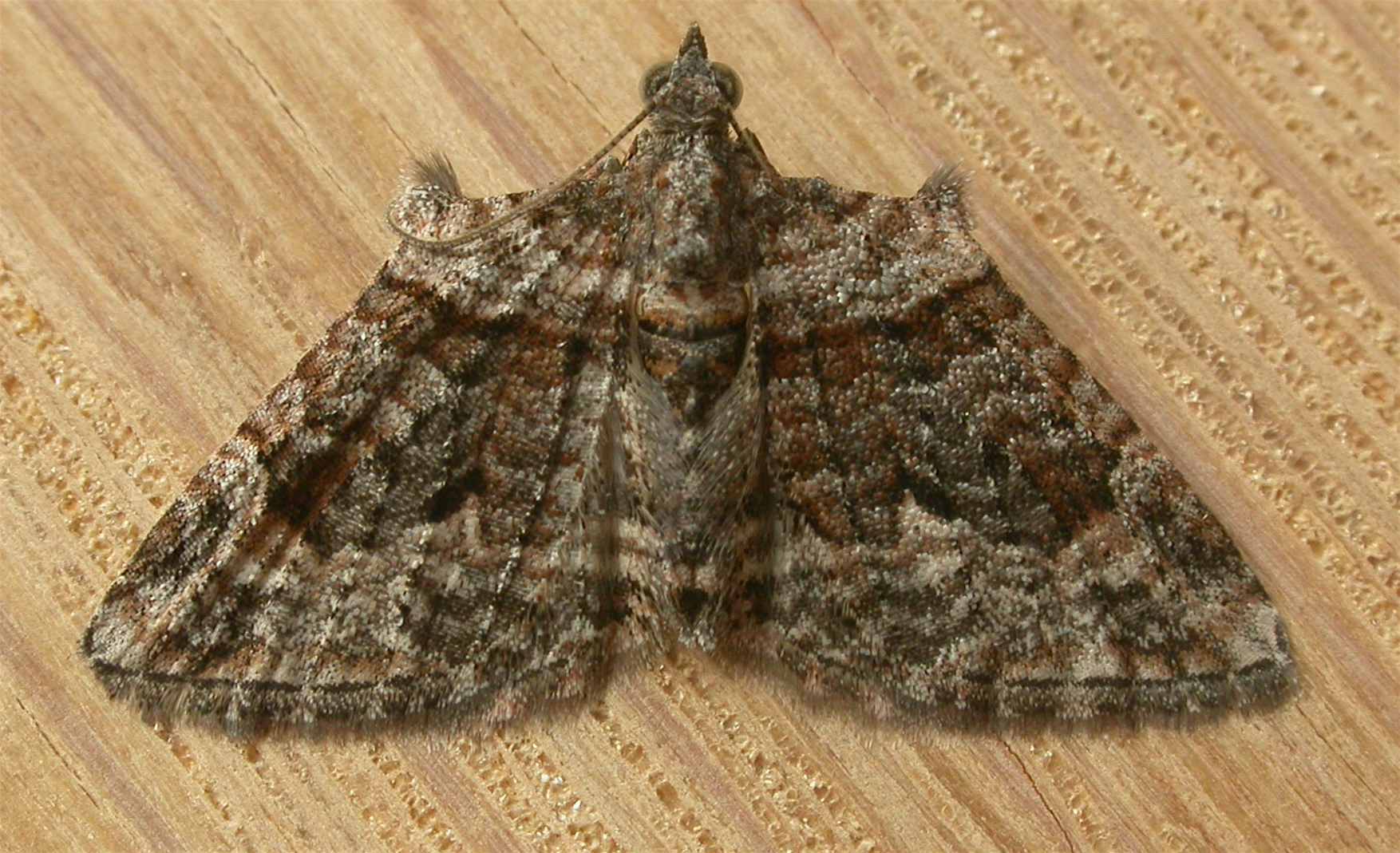

Scientific classification
- Kingdom: Animalia
- Phylum: Arthropoda
- Clade: Pancrustacea
- Class: Insecta
- Order: Lepidoptera
- Family: Geometridae
- Genus: Phrissogonus; Butler, 1882
- Species: P. laticostata

Binomial name
- Phrissogonus laticostata (Walker, 1862)

Synonyms
- Generic: Phrixogonus Meyrick, 1888; Specific: Larentia laticostatus Walker, 1862; Scotosia canata Walker, 1862; Scotosia canatus (Walker, 1862); Phrissogonus laticostatus (Walker, 1862)

= Phrissogonus =

Apple looper

Genus of moths

Phrissogonus is a monotypic genus of moth in the family Geometridae erected by Arthur Gardiner Butler in 1882. Its only species, Phrissogonus laticostata, the apple looper, was first described by Francis Walker in 1862. It is found in Australia, New Caledonia and New Zealand.

== Description ==
The wingspan is about 15 mm.

== Habitat and hosts ==
The larvae feed on Helianthus annuus, Hypericum perforatum, Clematis aristata and Acacia species.
