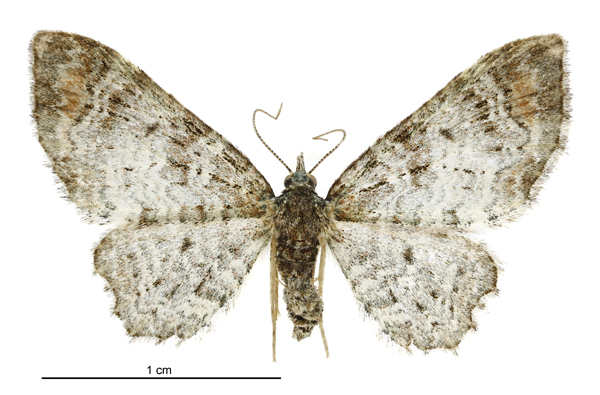
- Female
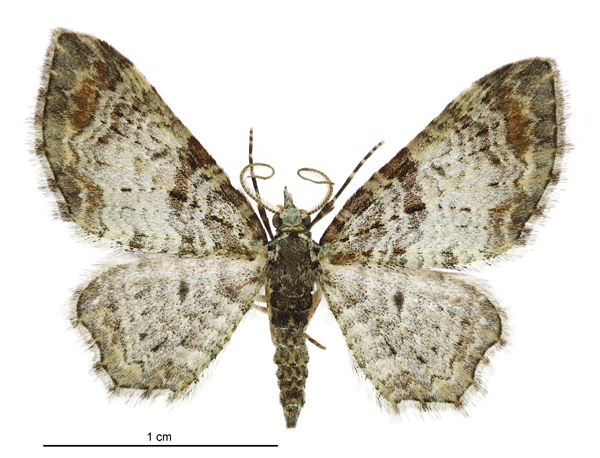
- Male

Scientific classification
- Kingdom: Animalia
- Phylum: Arthropoda
- Class: Insecta
- Order: Lepidoptera
- Family: Geometridae
- Genus: Pasiphila
- Species: P. aristias

Binomial name
- Pasiphila aristias (Meyrick, 1897)

Synonyms
- Chloroclystis aristias Meyrick, 1897

= Pasiphila aristias =

Species of moth

Pasiphila aristias is a species of moth in the family Geometridae. It was described by Edward Meyrick in 1897 and is endemic to New Zealand. This species is found in both the North and South Islands and inhabits subalpine and native forest. Adults are on the wing in December and January and are attracted to light.

== Taxonomy ==
This species was first described by Edward Meyrick in 1897 and named Chloroclystis aristias. George Hudson discussed and illustrated this species in both his 1898 and his 1928 books under that name. In 1971 John S. Dugdale placed this species in the genus Pasiphila. In 1988 Dugdale discussed this species under the name Pasiphila aristias and in 2010 Robert Hoare in the New Zealand Inventory of Biodiversity followed this placement. The male holotype specimen, collected by George Hudson in a limestone valley at the foot of Mount Peel in the Mount Arthur tablelands at an elevation of about 4000 ft, is held at the Natural History Museum, London.

== Description ==
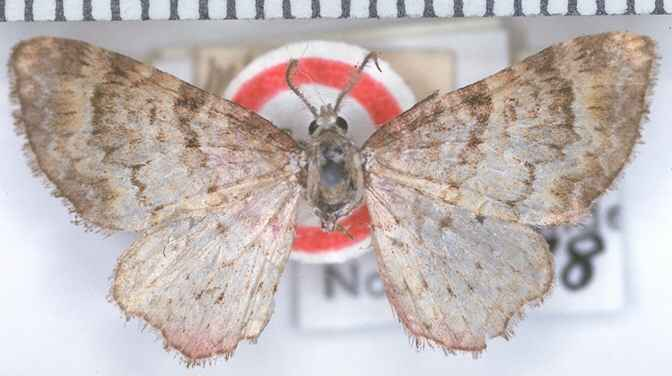
Pasiphila aristias, male holotype

Meyrick described this species as follows:

♂. 24 mm. Head white. Antennae with short fine pectinations terminating in fascicles of long cilia. Thorax ochreous-whitish, sprinkled with fuscous. Abdomen ochreous-whitish, somewhat blackish-mixed, segments 2 and 3 suffused with blackish, anal segment rosy-tinged. Forewings ochreous-whitish, with faint stripe of light reddish and dark fuscous scales; basal patch suffused with crimson and dark fuscous towards costa; edges of median band stronger and darker-marked, especially on costal half; a narrow transverse dark fuscous discal mark; fifth and sixth fasciae greyish-ochreous, suffused with dark fuscous towards costa. Hindwings with termen sinuate beneath apex; fuscous-whitish, with scattered dark fuscous scales indicating very faint striae; a dark fuscous discal dot; a postmedian series of small black dots; a rosy suffusion towards termen.

== Distribution ==
P. aristias is endemic to New Zealand and can be found on both the North and South Islands. Although considered an uncommon species by Brian Patrick, it has been observed in its type locality of Mount Peel in the Mount Arthur tablelands as well as on Mount Taranaki, in the Wellington Region, in the Homer Tunnel area in Fiordland, in Canterbury at the Orton Bradley Park, in Dunedin and on Ben Lomond in Otago.

== Behaviour ==
Adults are on the wing in December and January and are attracted to light.

== Habitat ==
This species inhabits subalpine and native forest.
