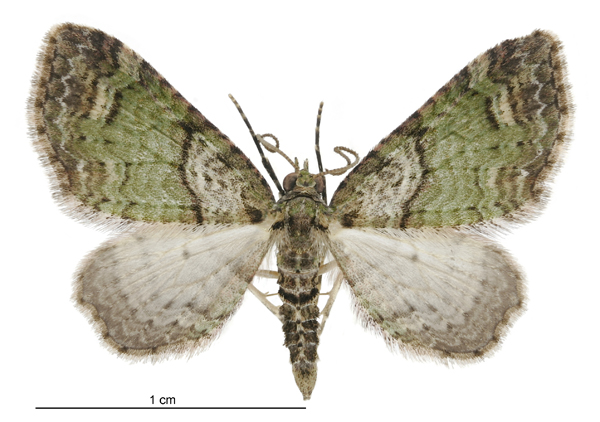
- Male specimen
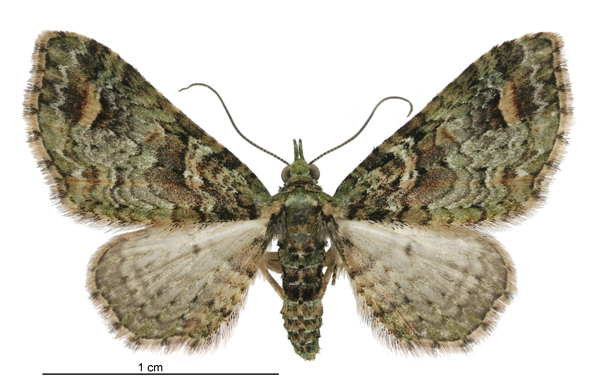
- Female specimen

Scientific classification
- Kingdom: Animalia
- Phylum: Arthropoda
- Clade: Pancrustacea
- Class: Insecta
- Order: Lepidoptera
- Family: Geometridae
- Genus: Chloroclystis
- Species: C. inductata

Binomial name
- Chloroclystis inductata (Walker, 1862)

Synonyms
- Coremia inductata Walker, 1862; Scotosia subitata Walker, 1862; Eupithecia indicataria Walker, 1863; Eupithecia semialbata Walker, 1863; Cidaria semilineata Felder and Rogenhofer, 1875; Chloroclystis semialbata (Felder and Rogenhofer, 1875)

= Chloroclystis inductata =

Species of moth

Chloroclystis inductata is a moth of the family Geometridae. It is endemic to New Zealand. It was first described by Francis Walker in 1862.

The larvae feed on the flowers of various plants.

They are attracted to light and have been collected via a mercury vapour light trap.
