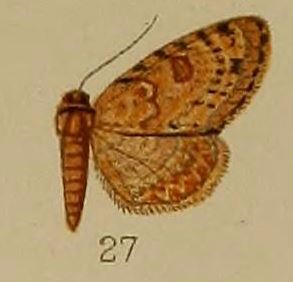
- Axinoptera plicata

Scientific classification
- Kingdom: Animalia
- Phylum: Arthropoda
- Class: Insecta
- Order: Lepidoptera
- Family: Geometridae
- Subfamily: Larentiinae
- Tribe: Eupitheciini
- Genus: Axinoptera; Hampson, 1893

= Axinoptera =

Genus of moths

Axinoptera is a genus of moths in the family Geometridae.

== Species ==
- Axinoptera anticostalis Galsworthy, 1999
- Axinoptera curviscapulis (Prout, 1958)
- Axinoptera fasciata (Warren, 1906)
- Axinoptera infusata (Walker, 1866)
- Axinoptera melampepla (Prout, 1958)
- Axinoptera orphnobathra (Prout, 1958)
- Axinoptera penataran Holloway, 1997
- Axinoptera plicata (Hampson, 1912)
- Axinoptera ruficosta Holloway, 1997
- Axinoptera subcostalis Hampson, 1893
- Axinoptera turgidata (Walker, 1866)
