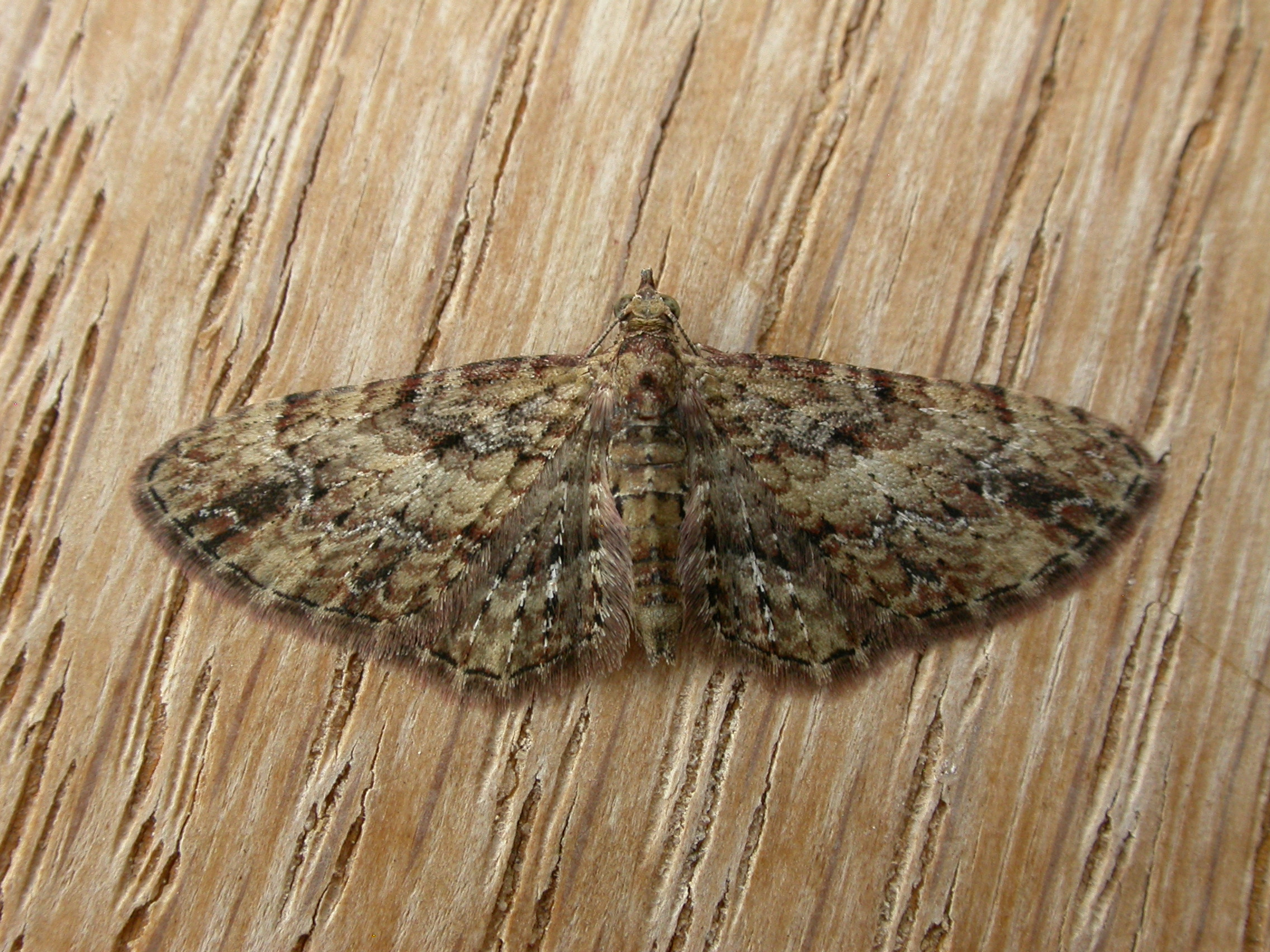

Scientific classification
- Kingdom: Animalia
- Phylum: Arthropoda
- Class: Insecta
- Order: Lepidoptera
- Family: Geometridae
- Genus: Mnesiloba
- Species: M. eupitheciata

Binomial name
- Mnesiloba eupitheciata (Walker, 1863)

Synonyms
- Phibalapteryx eupitheciata Walker, 1863; Cephalissa delogramma Meyrick, 1886

= Mnesiloba eupitheciata =

Species of moth

Mnesiloba eupitheciata is a moth of the family Geometridae. It is known from eastern Australia.

== Taxonomy ==
Mnesiloba dentifascia was treated as a synonym of Mnesiloba eupitheciata, but was later re-instated as a valid species.
