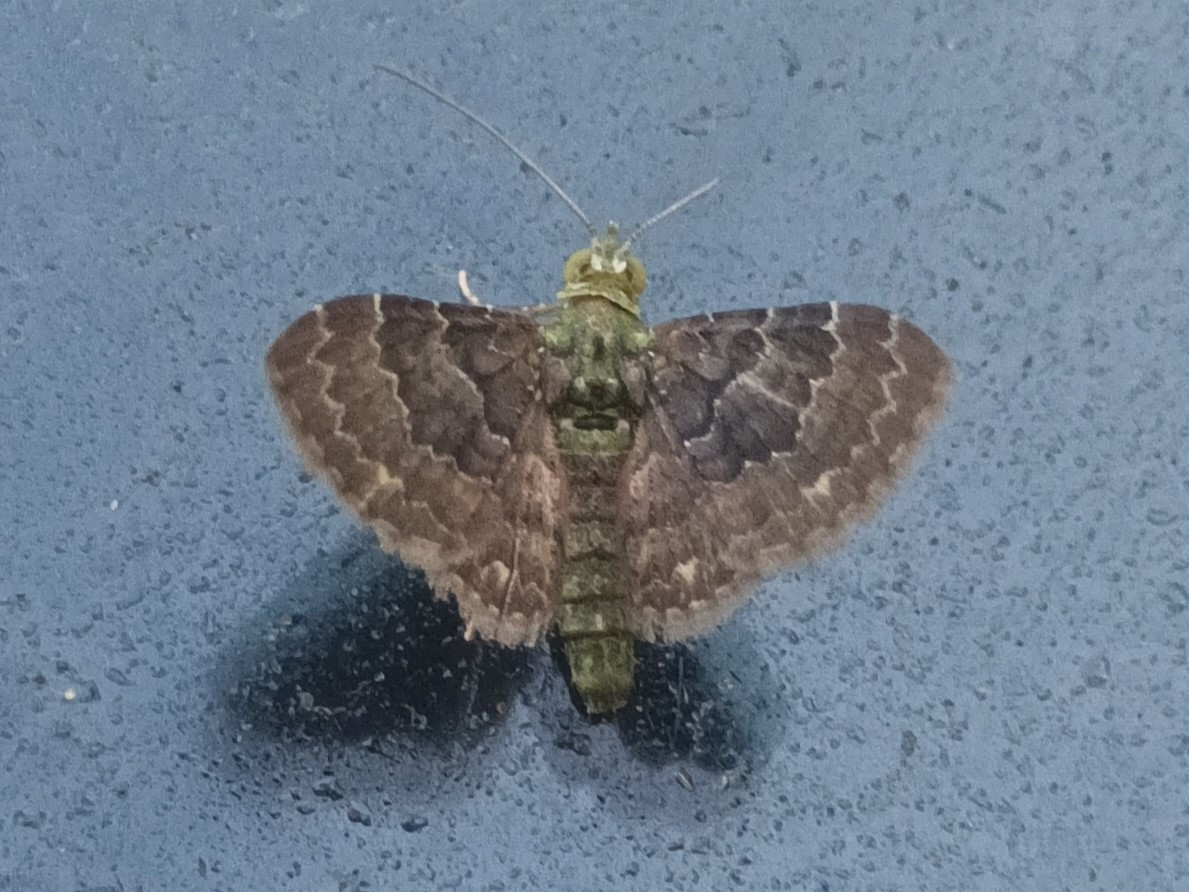

Scientific classification
- Domain: Eukaryota
- Kingdom: Animalia
- Phylum: Arthropoda
- Class: Insecta
- Order: Lepidoptera
- Family: Geometridae
- Genus: Antimimistis
- Species: A. attenuata

Binomial name
- Antimimistis attenuata (Moore, 1887)

Synonyms
- Eupithecia attenuata Moore, 1887; Antimimistis attenuata melamphaes Prout, 1958

= Antimimistis attenuata =

Species of moth

Antimimistis attenuata is a moth in the family Geometridae. It is found in Sri Lanka, north-eastern Himalaya, Borneo, Sulawesi, Seram and New Guinea. Records from Queensland refer to Antimimistis illaudata which is sometimes listed as a synonym of Antimimistis attenuata.
