= Ardonis malachitis =

Scientific classification
- Domain: Eukaryota
- Kingdom: Animalia
- Phylum: Arthropoda
- Class: Insecta
- Order: Lepidoptera
- Family: Geometridae
- Genus: Ardonis
- Species: A. malachitis

Binomial name
- Ardonis malachitis (Warren, 1903)

Synonyms
- Thamnocausta malachitis Warren, 1903

Species of moth

Ardonis malachitis is a moth in the family Geometridae. It is found on Seram and New Guinea.

== Taxonomy ==
It is sometimes listed as a subspecies of Ardonis filicata.
