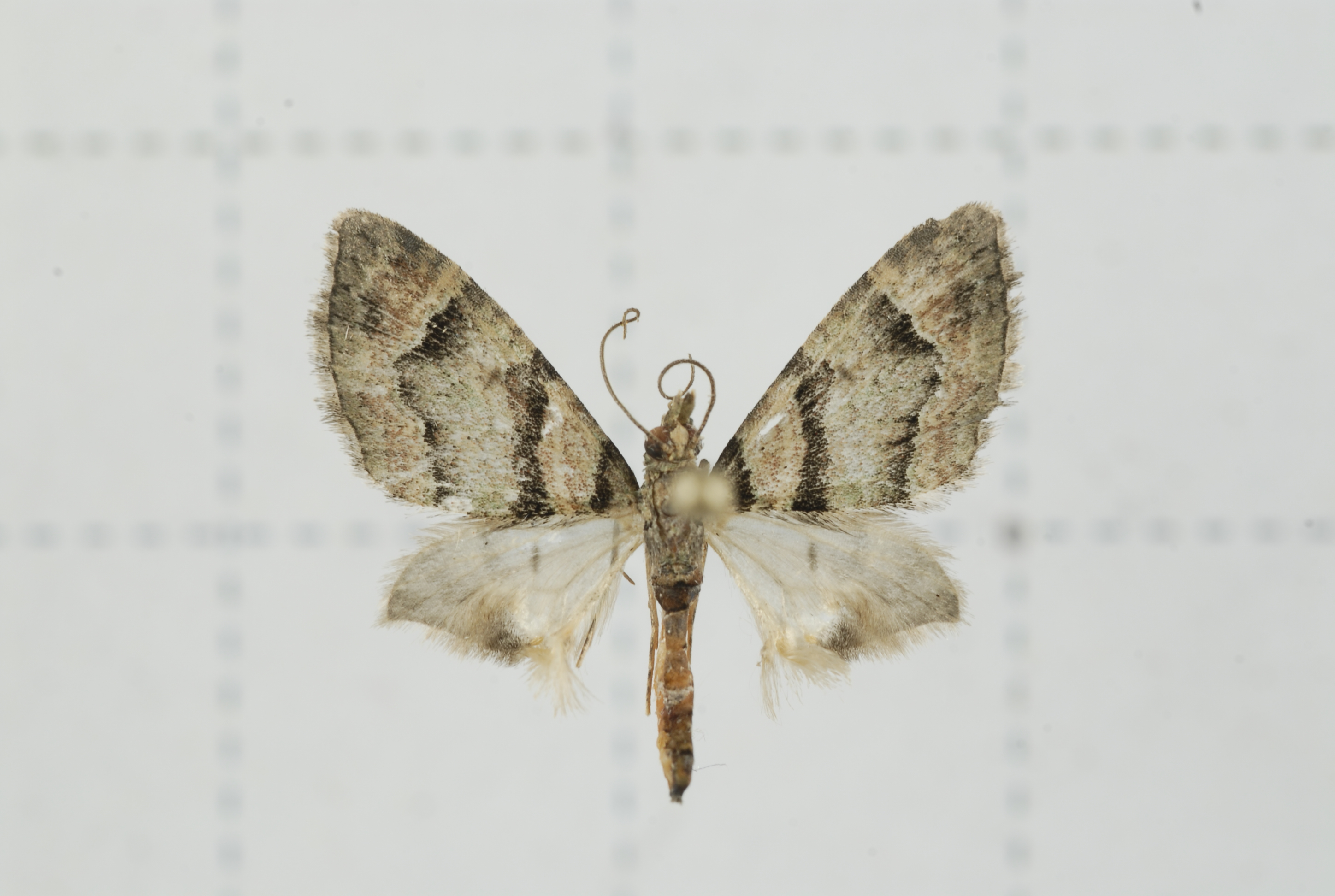

Scientific classification
- Kingdom: Animalia
- Phylum: Arthropoda
- Clade: Pancrustacea
- Class: Insecta
- Order: Lepidoptera
- Family: Geometridae
- Genus: Syncosmia
- Species: S. trichophora

Binomial name
- Syncosmia trichophora (Hampson, 1895)

Synonyms
- Chloroclystis trichophora Hampson, 1895; Eupithecia subviridis Vojnits, 1983

= Syncosmia trichophora =

Species of moth

Syncosmia trichophora is a moth in the family Geometridae first described by George Hampson in 1895. It is found in India and Nepal.

== Taxonomy ==
Hampson described the species in 1895 as Chloroclystis trichophora, placing it in the genus Chloroclystis in the third volume of The Fauna of British India, Including Ceylon and Burma. It was later transferred to Syncosmia, a genus erected by William Warren in 1897, which is classified in the tribe Eupitheciini of the subfamily Larentiinae. Eupithecia subviridis, named by Vojnits in 1983, is regarded as a junior synonym. About ten species are placed in Syncosmia.

== Description ==
The wingspan is about 20 mm. According to Hampson's original description, the adults are pale green, suffused with pale rufous. The forewings have indistinct blackish basal and antemedial bands with waved edges, while the hindwings are whitish with ochreous tufts.

== Distribution ==
The species has been recorded from India and Nepal.
