= Girida rigida =

Scientific classification
- Kingdom: Animalia
- Phylum: Arthropoda
- Clade: Pancrustacea
- Class: Insecta
- Order: Lepidoptera
- Family: Geometridae
- Genus: Girida
- Species: G. rigida

Binomial name
- Girida rigida (C. Swinhoe, 1892)

Synonyms
- Eupithecia rigida Swinhoe, 1892

Species of moth

Girida rigida is a moth in the family Geometridae first described by Charles Swinhoe in 1892. It is found from the Ryukyu Islands (Japan) through tropical and subtropical south-east Asia to India and New Caledonia. Records for eastern Africa refer to Girida sporadica, which was promoted to species rank in 2012.
