= Ardonis thaumasta =

Scientific classification
- Kingdom: Animalia
- Phylum: Arthropoda
- Clade: Pancrustacea
- Class: Insecta
- Order: Lepidoptera
- Family: Geometridae
- Genus: Ardonis
- Species: A. thaumasta

Binomial name
- Ardonis thaumasta (Prout, 1935)

Synonyms
- Chloroclystis thaumasta Prout, 1935

Species of moth

Ardonis thaumasta is a moth in the family Geometridae. It is found on Java.
