= Tripteridia stabilis =

Scientific classification
- Domain: Eukaryota
- Kingdom: Animalia
- Phylum: Arthropoda
- Class: Insecta
- Order: Lepidoptera
- Family: Geometridae
- Genus: Tripteridia
- Species: T. stabilis

Binomial name
- Tripteridia stabilis (Warren, 1906)

Synonyms
- Tephroclystia stabilis Warren, 1906

Species of moth

Tripteridia stabilis is a moth in the family Geometridae. It is found in New Guinea.
