= Prorella desperata =

Scientific classification
- Kingdom: Animalia
- Phylum: Arthropoda
- Class: Insecta
- Order: Lepidoptera
- Family: Geometridae
- Genus: Prorella
- Species: P. desperata

Binomial name
- Prorella desperata (Hulst, 1896)

Synonyms
- Gymnoscelis desperata Hulst, 1896

Species of moth

Prorella desperata is a moth in the family Geometridae first described by George Duryea Hulst in 1896. It is found in the US states of Arizona and Texas.

The wingspan is about 17–19 mm. Adults have been recorded on wing in August and September.
