= Mnesiloba cauditornata =

Scientific classification
- Kingdom: Animalia
- Phylum: Arthropoda
- Clade: Pancrustacea
- Class: Insecta
- Order: Lepidoptera
- Family: Geometridae
- Genus: Mnesiloba
- Species: M. cauditornata

Binomial name
- Mnesiloba cauditornata (Prout, 1931)

Synonyms
- Eupithecia cauditornata Prout, 1931

Species of moth

Mnesiloba cauditornata is a moth in the family Geometridae. It is found in New Guinea.
