= Mariaba =

Scientific classification
- Kingdom: Animalia
- Phylum: Arthropoda
- Class: Insecta
- Order: Lepidoptera
- Family: Geometridae
- Tribe: Eupitheciini
- Genus: Mariaba; Walker, 1866

Synonyms
- Adeta Warren, 1903

Genus of moths

Mariaba is a genus of moths in the family Geometridae first described by Francis Walker in 1866.

== Species ==
- Mariaba convoluta Walker, 1866
- Mariaba semifascia (Warren, 1903)
