= Onagrodes eucineta =

Scientific classification
- Kingdom: Animalia
- Phylum: Arthropoda
- Clade: Pancrustacea
- Class: Insecta
- Order: Lepidoptera
- Family: Geometridae
- Genus: Onagrodes
- Species: O. eucineta

Binomial name
- Onagrodes eucineta Prout, 1958

Species of moth

Onagrodes eucineta is a moth in the family Geometridae. It is found on Peninsular Malaysia and Borneo.
