= Tripteridia dilopha =

Scientific classification
- Kingdom: Animalia
- Phylum: Arthropoda
- Clade: Pancrustacea
- Class: Insecta
- Order: Lepidoptera
- Family: Geometridae
- Genus: Tripteridia
- Species: T. dilopha

Binomial name
- Tripteridia dilopha (Prout, 1958)

Synonyms
- Micromia dilopha Prout, 1958

Species of moth

Tripteridia dilopha is a moth in the family Geometridae. It is found in New Guinea.
