= Mariaba semifascia =

Scientific classification
- Domain: Eukaryota
- Kingdom: Animalia
- Phylum: Arthropoda
- Class: Insecta
- Order: Lepidoptera
- Family: Geometridae
- Genus: Mariaba
- Species: M. semifascia

Binomial name
- Mariaba semifascia (Warren, 1903)

Synonyms
- Adeta semifascia Warren, 1903

Species of moth

Mariaba semifascia is a moth in the family Geometridae. It is found in New Guinea and on the Solomon Islands and Sulawesi.
