= Tripteridia eusemozona =

Scientific classification
- Kingdom: Animalia
- Phylum: Arthropoda
- Clade: Pancrustacea
- Class: Insecta
- Order: Lepidoptera
- Family: Geometridae
- Genus: Tripteridia
- Species: T. eusemozona

Binomial name
- Tripteridia eusemozona (Prout, 1916)

Synonyms
- Prosthetopteryx eusemozona Prout, 1916

Species of moth

Tripteridia eusemozona is a moth in the family Geometridae. It is found in New Guinea.
