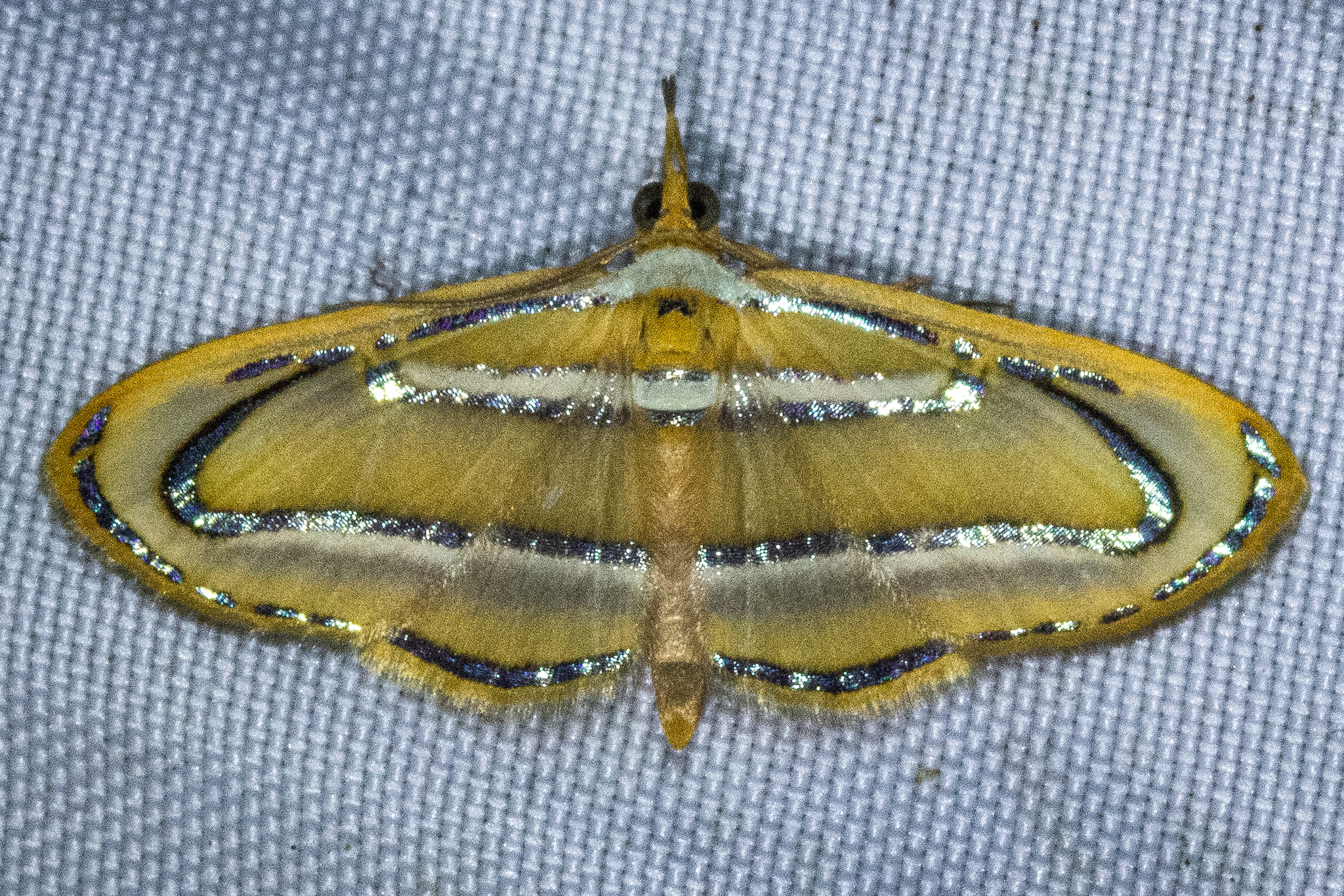
- Chrysoclystis morbosa

Scientific classification
- Domain: Eukaryota
- Kingdom: Animalia
- Phylum: Arthropoda
- Class: Insecta
- Order: Lepidoptera
- Family: Geometridae
- Tribe: Eupitheciini
- Genus: Chrysoclystis; Warren, 1896

= Chrysoclystis =

Genus of moths

Chrysoclystis is a genus of moth in the family Geometridae.

== Species ==
- Chrysoclystis morbosa Prout, 1926
- Chrysoclystis perornata Warren, 1896
