= Nasusina inferior =

Scientific classification
- Domain: Eukaryota
- Kingdom: Animalia
- Phylum: Arthropoda
- Class: Insecta
- Order: Lepidoptera
- Family: Geometridae
- Genus: Nasusina
- Species: N. inferior

Binomial name
- Nasusina inferior (Hulst, 1896)

Synonyms
- Gymnoscelis inferior Hulst, 1896

Species of moth

Nasusina inferior is a moth in the family Geometridae. It is found in southern California.

The wingspan is about 18 mm and the length of the forewings is 9–10 mm. Adults are on wing from March to June.
