= Tripteridia subcomosa =

Scientific classification
- Domain: Eukaryota
- Kingdom: Animalia
- Phylum: Arthropoda
- Class: Insecta
- Order: Lepidoptera
- Family: Geometridae
- Genus: Tripteridia
- Species: T. subcomosa

Binomial name
- Tripteridia subcomosa Warren, 1907

Synonyms
- Micromia subcomosa; Micromia (Tripteridia) subcomosa animata Prout, 1932; Micromia animata

Species of moth

Tripteridia subcomosa is a moth in the family Geometridae. It is found in New Guinea and on the southern Moluccas and Borneo.
