= Syncosmia eurymesa =

Scientific classification
- Kingdom: Animalia
- Phylum: Arthropoda
- Clade: Pancrustacea
- Class: Insecta
- Order: Lepidoptera
- Family: Geometridae
- Genus: Syncosmia
- Species: S. eurymesa

Binomial name
- Syncosmia eurymesa (Prout, 1926)

Synonyms
- Rhinoprora eurymesa Prout, 1926; Chloroclystis eurymesa

Species of moth

Syncosmia eurymesa is a moth in the family Geometridae. It is found on Borneo.
