= Prorella emmedonia =

Scientific classification
- Domain: Eukaryota
- Kingdom: Animalia
- Phylum: Arthropoda
- Class: Insecta
- Order: Lepidoptera
- Family: Geometridae
- Genus: Prorella
- Species: P. emmedonia

Binomial name
- Prorella emmedonia (Grossbeck, 1908)

Synonyms
- Eupithecia emmedonia Grossbeck, 1908

Species of moth

Prorella emmedonia is a moth in the family Geometridae first described by John Arthur Grossbeck in 1908. It is found in the US states of California and Arizona.

The wingspan is about 17 mm. Adults have been recorded on wing in August and September.
