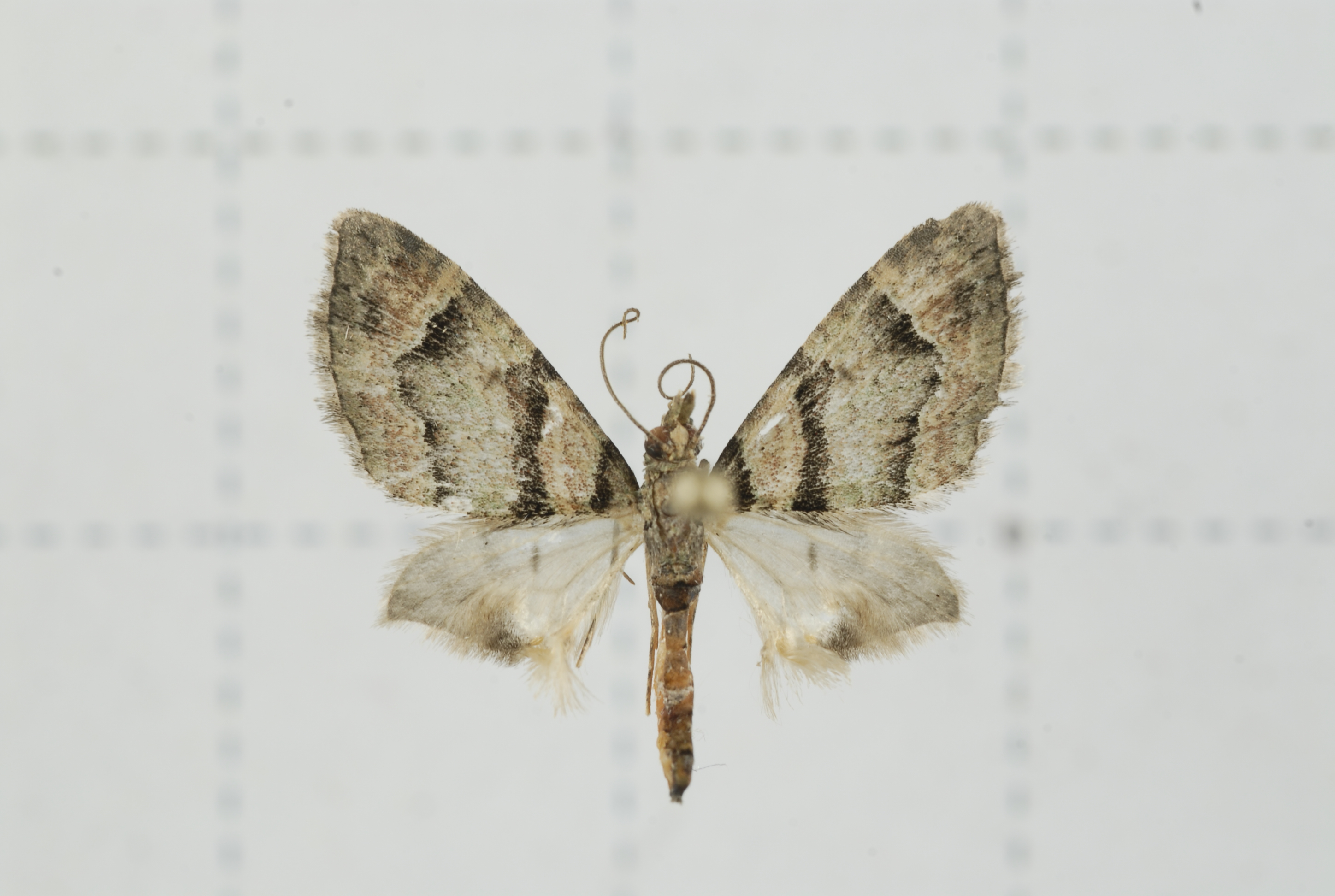
- Syncosmia trichophora

Scientific classification
- Domain: Eukaryota
- Kingdom: Animalia
- Phylum: Arthropoda
- Class: Insecta
- Order: Lepidoptera
- Family: Geometridae
- Tribe: Eupitheciini
- Genus: Syncosmia; Warren, 1897

= Syncosmia =

Genus of moths

Syncosmia is a genus of moths in the family Geometridae first described by Warren in 1897.

== Species ==
- Syncosmia craspedozona (Prout, 1958)
- Syncosmia discisuffusa (Holloway, 1976)
- Syncosmia dissographa (Prout, 1958)
- Syncosmia eugerys (Prout, 1929)
- Syncosmia eurymesa (Prout, 1926)
- Syncosmia layanga (Holloway, 1976)
- Syncosmia patinata Warren, 1897
- Syncosmia seminotata (Warren, 1898)
- Syncosmia trichophora (Hampson, 1895)
- Syncosmia xanthocomes (Prout, 1926)
