= Tripteridia fletcheri =

Scientific classification
- Kingdom: Animalia
- Phylum: Arthropoda
- Clade: Pancrustacea
- Class: Insecta
- Order: Lepidoptera
- Family: Geometridae
- Genus: Tripteridia
- Species: T. fletcheri

Binomial name
- Tripteridia fletcheri (Holloway, 1976)

Synonyms
- Micromia fletcheri Holloway, 1976

Species of moth

Tripteridia fletcheri is a moth in the family Geometridae. It is found on Borneo and possibly in New Guinea. The habitat consists of mountainous areas.
