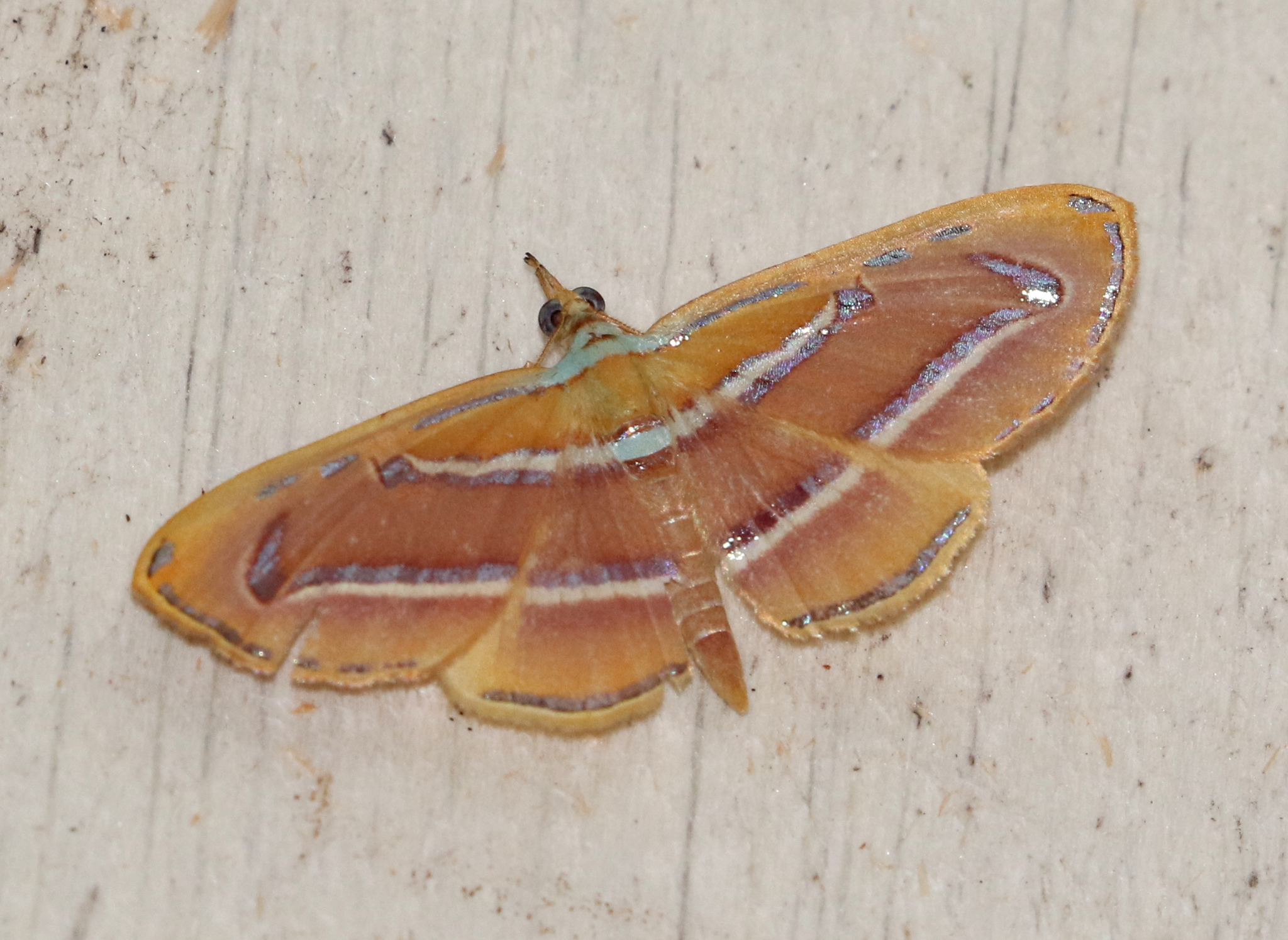

Scientific classification
- Domain: Eukaryota
- Kingdom: Animalia
- Phylum: Arthropoda
- Class: Insecta
- Order: Lepidoptera
- Family: Geometridae
- Genus: Chrysoclystis
- Species: C. perornata

Binomial name
- Chrysoclystis perornata Warren, 1896

= Chrysoclystis perornata =

Species of moth

Chrysoclystis perornata is a species of moth in the family Geometridae. It is found on New Guinea.
