= Celaenaclystis celaenacris =

Scientific classification
- Kingdom: Animalia
- Phylum: Arthropoda
- Clade: Pancrustacea
- Class: Insecta
- Order: Lepidoptera
- Family: Geometridae
- Genus: Celaenaclystis
- Species: C. celaenacris

Binomial name
- Celaenaclystis celaenacris (Prout, 1932)

Synonyms
- Chloroclystis celaenacris Prout, 1932

Species of moth

Celaenaclystis celaenacris is a moth in the family Geometridae. It is found on Borneo.
