= Prorella leucata =

Scientific classification
- Kingdom: Animalia
- Phylum: Arthropoda
- Clade: Pancrustacea
- Class: Insecta
- Order: Lepidoptera
- Family: Geometridae
- Genus: Prorella
- Species: P. leucata

Binomial name
- Prorella leucata (Hulst, 1896)

Synonyms
- Tephroclystia leucata Hulst, 1896

Species of moth

Prorella leucata is a moth in the family Geometridae first described by George Duryea Hulst in 1896. It is found in North America from California through Colorado, Maine, Montana, Oregon and Utah to British Columbia.

The wingspan is about 20 mm. Adults are on wing from June to September.
