= Celaenaclystis =

Scientific classification
- Kingdom: Animalia
- Phylum: Arthropoda
- Clade: Pancrustacea
- Class: Insecta
- Order: Lepidoptera
- Family: Geometridae
- Tribe: Eupitheciini
- Genus: Celaenaclystis; Holloway, 1997

Genus of moths

Celaenaclystis is a genus of moth in the family Geometridae.

== Species ==
- Celaenaclystis celaenacris (Prout, 1932)
- Celaenaclystis telygeta (Prout, 1932)
