= Micrulia medioplaga =

Scientific classification
- Domain: Eukaryota
- Kingdom: Animalia
- Phylum: Arthropoda
- Class: Insecta
- Order: Lepidoptera
- Family: Geometridae
- Genus: Micrulia
- Species: M. medioplaga

Binomial name
- Micrulia medioplaga (C. Swinhoe, 1902)

Synonyms
- Mariaba medioplaga C. Swinhoe, 1902; Eupithecia eurotosoma Hampson, 1903

Species of moth

Micrulia medioplaga is a moth in the family Geometridae first described by Charles Swinhoe in 1902. It is found on Borneo, Bali, Sulawesi and Sri Lanka. The habitat mostly consists of lowland forests (including secondary and coastal forests), but it has also been recorded in lower montane forests.
