= Micrulia =

Scientific classification
- Domain: Eukaryota
- Kingdom: Animalia
- Phylum: Arthropoda
- Class: Insecta
- Order: Lepidoptera
- Family: Geometridae
- Tribe: Eupitheciini
- Genus: Micrulia; Warren, 1896

Species
- Megatheca Warren, 1897; Opistheploce Warren, 1896

Genus of moths

Micrulia is a genus of moths in the family Geometridae.

== Species ==
- Micrulia catocalaria (Snellen, 1881)
- Micrulia cinerea (Warren, 1896)
- Micrulia gyroducta (D. S. Fletcher, 1957)
- Micrulia medioplaga (Swinhoe, 1902)
- Micrulia rufula (Warren, 1899)
- Micrulia subzebrina Holloway, 1997
- Micrulia tenuilinea Warren, 1896
