= Prorella protoptata =

Scientific classification
- Domain: Eukaryota
- Kingdom: Animalia
- Phylum: Arthropoda
- Class: Insecta
- Order: Lepidoptera
- Family: Geometridae
- Genus: Prorella
- Species: P. protoptata

Binomial name
- Prorella protoptata (McDunnough, 1938)

Synonyms
- Eupithecia protoptata McDunnough, 1938

Species of moth

Prorella protoptata is a moth in the family Geometridae first described by James Halliday McDunnough in 1938. It is found in the US in south-western Texas.

The wingspan is about 16 mm. Adults have been recorded on wing from May to June.
