= Tripteridia synclinogramma =

Scientific classification
- Kingdom: Animalia
- Phylum: Arthropoda
- Clade: Pancrustacea
- Class: Insecta
- Order: Lepidoptera
- Family: Geometridae
- Genus: Tripteridia
- Species: T. synclinogramma

Binomial name
- Tripteridia synclinogramma (Prout, 1916)

Synonyms
- Eupithecia synclinogramma Prout, 1916; Chaetolopha synclinogramma

Species of moth

Tripteridia synclinogramma is a moth in the family Geometridae. It is found in Papua New Guinea.
