= Onagrodes oosyndica =

Scientific classification
- Kingdom: Animalia
- Phylum: Arthropoda
- Clade: Pancrustacea
- Class: Insecta
- Order: Lepidoptera
- Family: Geometridae
- Genus: Onagrodes
- Species: O. oosyndica

Binomial name
- Onagrodes oosyndica Prout, 1958

Species of moth

Onagrodes oosyndica is a moth in the family Geometridae. It is found on Peninsular Malaysia, Sumatra, Borneo and Sulawesi.
