= Ardonis dentifera =

Scientific classification
- Domain: Eukaryota
- Kingdom: Animalia
- Phylum: Arthropoda
- Class: Insecta
- Order: Lepidoptera
- Family: Geometridae
- Genus: Ardonis
- Species: A. dentifera

Binomial name
- Ardonis dentifera Warren, 1906

Synonyms
- Chloroclystis dentifera

Species of moth

Ardonis dentifera is a moth in the family Geometridae. It is found in New Guinea.
