= Prorella remorata =

Scientific classification
- Domain: Eukaryota
- Kingdom: Animalia
- Phylum: Arthropoda
- Class: Insecta
- Order: Lepidoptera
- Family: Geometridae
- Genus: Prorella
- Species: P. remorata

Binomial name
- Prorella remorata (Grossbeck, 1907)

Synonyms
- Gymnoscelis remorata Grossbeck, 1907

Species of moth

Prorella remorata is a moth in the family Geometridae first described by John Arthur Grossbeck in 1907. It is found in the US state of Arizona.

The wingspan is about 18 mm. Adults have been recorded on wing in March and August.
