= Tripteridia dinosia =

Scientific classification
- Kingdom: Animalia
- Phylum: Arthropoda
- Clade: Pancrustacea
- Class: Insecta
- Order: Lepidoptera
- Family: Geometridae
- Genus: Tripteridia
- Species: T. dinosia

Binomial name
- Tripteridia dinosia (Prout, 1926)

Synonyms
- Eupithecia dinosia Prout, 1926; Micromia (Prosthetopteryx) chlaenistes Prout, 1932; Micromia chlaenistes

Species of moth

Tripteridia dinosia is a moth in the family Geometridae. It is found on Borneo. The habitat consists of mountainous areas.
