= Syncosmia dissographa =

Scientific classification
- Kingdom: Animalia
- Phylum: Arthropoda
- Clade: Pancrustacea
- Class: Insecta
- Order: Lepidoptera
- Family: Geometridae
- Genus: Syncosmia
- Species: S. dissographa

Binomial name
- Syncosmia dissographa (Prout, 1958)

Synonyms
- Chloroclystis dissographa Prout, 1958

Species of moth

Syncosmia dissographa is a moth in the family Geometridae. It is found on Sulawesi, Borneo, Java and Bali.

The forewings have a bone-white ground colour with brown suffusion.
