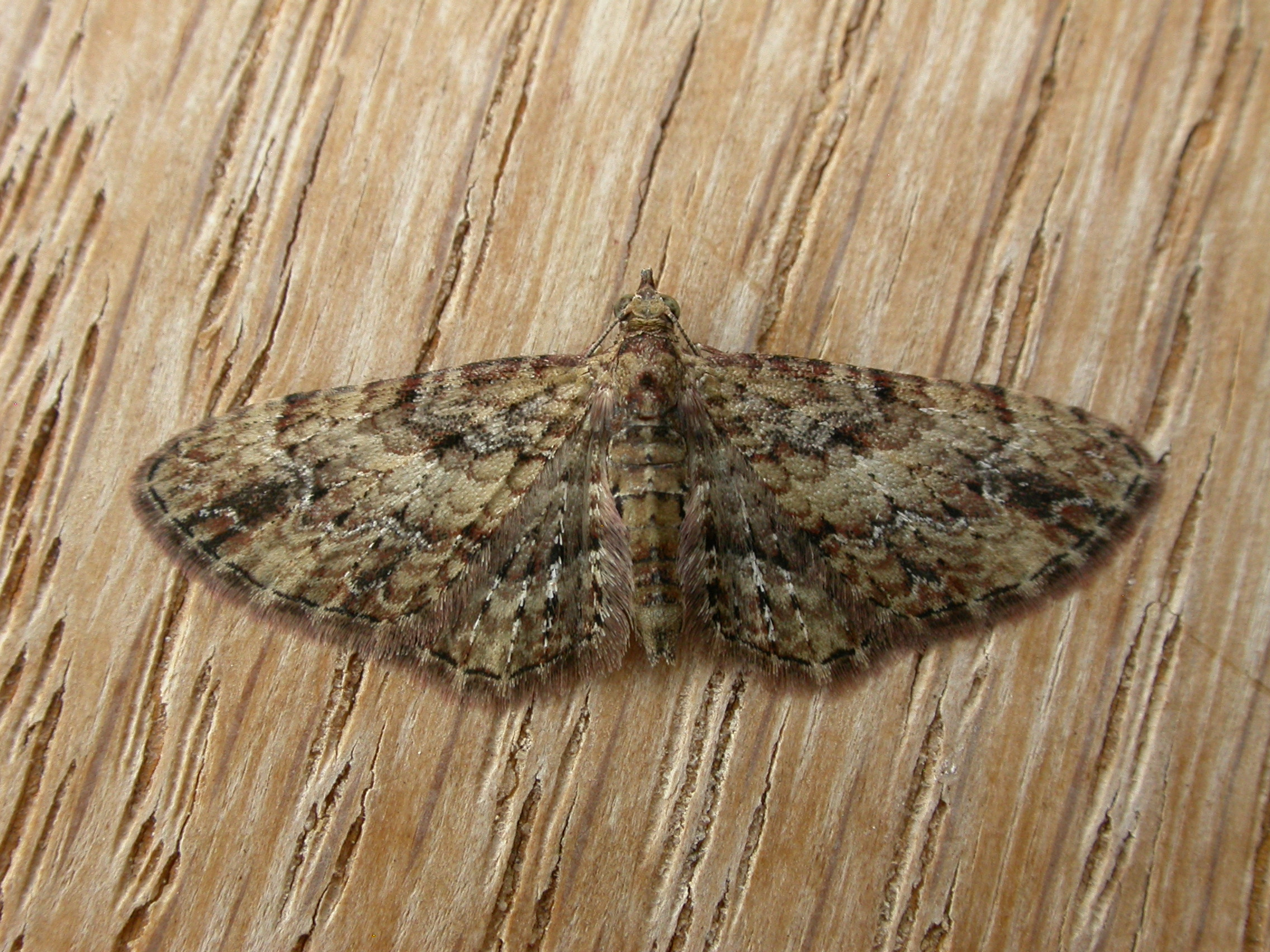
- Mnesiloba eupitheciata (Walker, [1863]), to MV light, Aranda, ACT, 21/22 November 2010

Scientific classification
- Domain: Eukaryota
- Kingdom: Animalia
- Phylum: Arthropoda
- Class: Insecta
- Order: Lepidoptera
- Family: Geometridae
- Tribe: Eupitheciini
- Genus: Mnesiloba; Warren, 1901

= Mnesiloba =

Genus of moths

Mnesiloba is a genus of moth in the family Geometridae.

== Species ==
- Mnesiloba cauditornata (Prout, 1931)
- Mnesiloba dentifascia (Hampson, 1891)
- Mnesiloba eupitheciata (Walker, 1863)
- Mnesiloba intentata (Walker, 1866)
