= Tripteridia olivaceata =

Scientific classification
- Domain: Eukaryota
- Kingdom: Animalia
- Phylum: Arthropoda
- Class: Insecta
- Order: Lepidoptera
- Family: Geometridae
- Genus: Tripteridia
- Species: T. olivaceata

Binomial name
- Tripteridia olivaceata (Warren, 1899)

Synonyms
- Tephroclystia olivaceata Warren, 1899; Micromia defulvata Warren, 1907

Species of moth

Tripteridia olivaceata is a moth in the family Geometridae. It is found in New Guinea.
