= Onagrodes =

Scientific classification
- Kingdom: Animalia
- Phylum: Arthropoda
- Class: Insecta
- Order: Lepidoptera
- Family: Geometridae
- Subfamily: Larentiinae
- Tribe: Eupitheciini
- Genus: Onagrodes; Warren, 1896

Genus of moths

Onagrodes is a genus of moths in the family Geometridae.

== Species ==
- Onagrodes barbarula Prout, 1958
- Onagrodes eucineta Prout, 1958
- Onagrodes obscurata Warren, 1896
- Onagrodes oosyndica Prout, 1958
- Onagrodes recurva Warren, 1907
- Onagrodes victoria Prout, 1958
