= Tripteridia =

Scientific classification
- Domain: Eukaryota
- Kingdom: Animalia
- Phylum: Arthropoda
- Class: Insecta
- Order: Lepidoptera
- Family: Geometridae
- Tribe: Eupitheciini
- Genus: Tripteridia; Warren, 1903

Synonyms
- Prosthetopteryx Warren, 1906; Stenista Warren, 1907

Genus of moths

Tripteridia is a genus of moths in the family Geometridae.

== Species ==
- Tripteridia acroscotia
- Tripteridia albimixta
- Tripteridia barbata
- Tripteridia caesiata
- Tripteridia cavilinea
- Tripteridia commixtilinea
- Tripteridia conquadrata
- Tripteridia decens
- Tripteridia dilopha
- Tripteridia dinosia
- Tripteridia dympna
- Tripteridia dystacta
- Tripteridia ectocosma
- Tripteridia eusemozona
- Tripteridia euthynsis
- Tripteridia expectans
- Tripteridia fletcheri
- Tripteridia fulgurans
- Tripteridia hypocalypsis
- Tripteridia infantilis
- Tripteridia latistriga
- Tripteridia leucocarpa
- Tripteridia monochasma
- Tripteridia ni
- Tripteridia novella
- Tripteridia novenaria
- Tripteridia olivaceata
- Tripteridia parvipennata
- Tripteridia recessilinea
- Tripteridia rotundata
- Tripteridia scotochlaena
- Tripteridia stabilis
- Tripteridia subcomosa
- Tripteridia synclinogramma
- Tripteridia thaumasia
- Tripteridia transsecta
- Tripteridia vinosa
- Tripteridia viridisecta
