= Nasusina vaporata =

Scientific classification
- Kingdom: Animalia
- Phylum: Arthropoda
- Class: Insecta
- Order: Lepidoptera
- Family: Geometridae
- Genus: Nasusina
- Species: N. vaporata

Binomial name
- Nasusina vaporata (Pearsall, 1912)

Synonyms
- Eupithecia vaporata Pearsall, 1912

Species of moth

Nasusina vaporata is a moth in the family Geometridae first described by Pearsall in 1912. It is found in the United States in southern California, Nevada and probably Arizona.

The wingspan is 13–14 mm. Adults have been recorded on wing from April to June.
