= Antimimistis =

Scientific classification
- Kingdom: Animalia
- Phylum: Arthropoda
- Class: Insecta
- Order: Lepidoptera
- Family: Geometridae
- Subfamily: Larentiinae
- Tribe: Eupitheciini
- Genus: Antimimistis; Turner, 1922

Genus of geometer moths

Antimimistis is a genus of moths in the family Geometridae.

== Species ==
- Antimimistis attenuata (Moore, 1887)
- Antimimistis cuprina Prout, 1958
- Antimimistis illaudata Turner, 1922
- Antimimistis subteracta Prout, 1925
