= Carbia moderata =

Scientific classification
- Kingdom: Animalia
- Phylum: Arthropoda
- Class: Insecta
- Order: Lepidoptera
- Family: Geometridae
- Genus: Carbia
- Species: C. moderata

Binomial name
- Carbia moderata (Walker, 1866)

Synonyms
- Eupithecia moderata Walker, 1866

Species of moth

Carbia moderata is a moth in the family Geometridae. It is found on Borneo and Peninsular Malaysia. The habitat consists of lowland areas.

Adults are brownish grey with uniform hindwings.
