= Tripteridia rotundata =

Scientific classification
- Domain: Eukaryota
- Kingdom: Animalia
- Phylum: Arthropoda
- Class: Insecta
- Order: Lepidoptera
- Family: Geometridae
- Genus: Tripteridia
- Species: T. rotundata

Binomial name
- Tripteridia rotundata (Warren, 1906)

Synonyms
- Prosthetopteryx rotundata Warren, 1906

Species of moth

Tripteridia rotundata is a moth in the family Geometridae. It is found in New Guinea.
