= Mariaba convoluta =

Scientific classification
- Kingdom: Animalia
- Phylum: Arthropoda
- Class: Insecta
- Order: Lepidoptera
- Family: Geometridae
- Genus: Mariaba
- Species: M. convoluta

Binomial name
- Mariaba convoluta Walker, 1866

Synonyms
- Megatheca ampla Warren, 1899

Species of moth

Mariaba convoluta is a moth in the family Geometridae. It is found on Borneo, Lombok, Sulawesi and in Burma and the north-eastern Himalayas. The habitat consists of lowland alluvial and hill dipterocarp forests.
