= Tripteridia commixtilinea =

Scientific classification
- Domain: Eukaryota
- Kingdom: Animalia
- Phylum: Arthropoda
- Class: Insecta
- Order: Lepidoptera
- Family: Geometridae
- Genus: Tripteridia
- Species: T. commixtilinea

Binomial name
- Tripteridia commixtilinea (Warren, 1907)

Synonyms
- Stenista commixtilinea Warren, 1907

Species of moth

Tripteridia commixtilinea is a moth in the family Geometridae. It is found in New Guinea.
