= Aepylopha =

Scientific classification
- Kingdom: Animalia
- Phylum: Arthropoda
- Class: Insecta
- Order: Lepidoptera
- Family: Geometridae
- Tribe: Eupitheciini
- Genus: Aepylopha; Turner, 1942
- Species: A. thalassia

Binomial name
- Aepylopha thalassia Turner, 1942

Monotypic genus of geometer moths

Aepylopha is a genus of moths in the family Geometridae. It contains only one species, Aepylopha thalassia, which is found in Australia.
