= Pycnoloma =

Scientific classification
- Kingdom: Animalia
- Phylum: Arthropoda
- Class: Insecta
- Order: Lepidoptera
- Family: Geometridae
- Tribe: Eupitheciini
- Genus: Pycnoloma; Warren, 1906
- Species: P. rufibasalis

Binomial name
- Pycnoloma rufibasalis Warren, 1906

Synonyms
- Chloroclystis rufibasalis

Genus of moths

Pycnoloma is a monotypic moth genus in the family Geometridae. It contains only one species, Pycnoloma rufibasalis, which is found in New Guinea. Both the genus and species were first described by William Warren in 1906.
