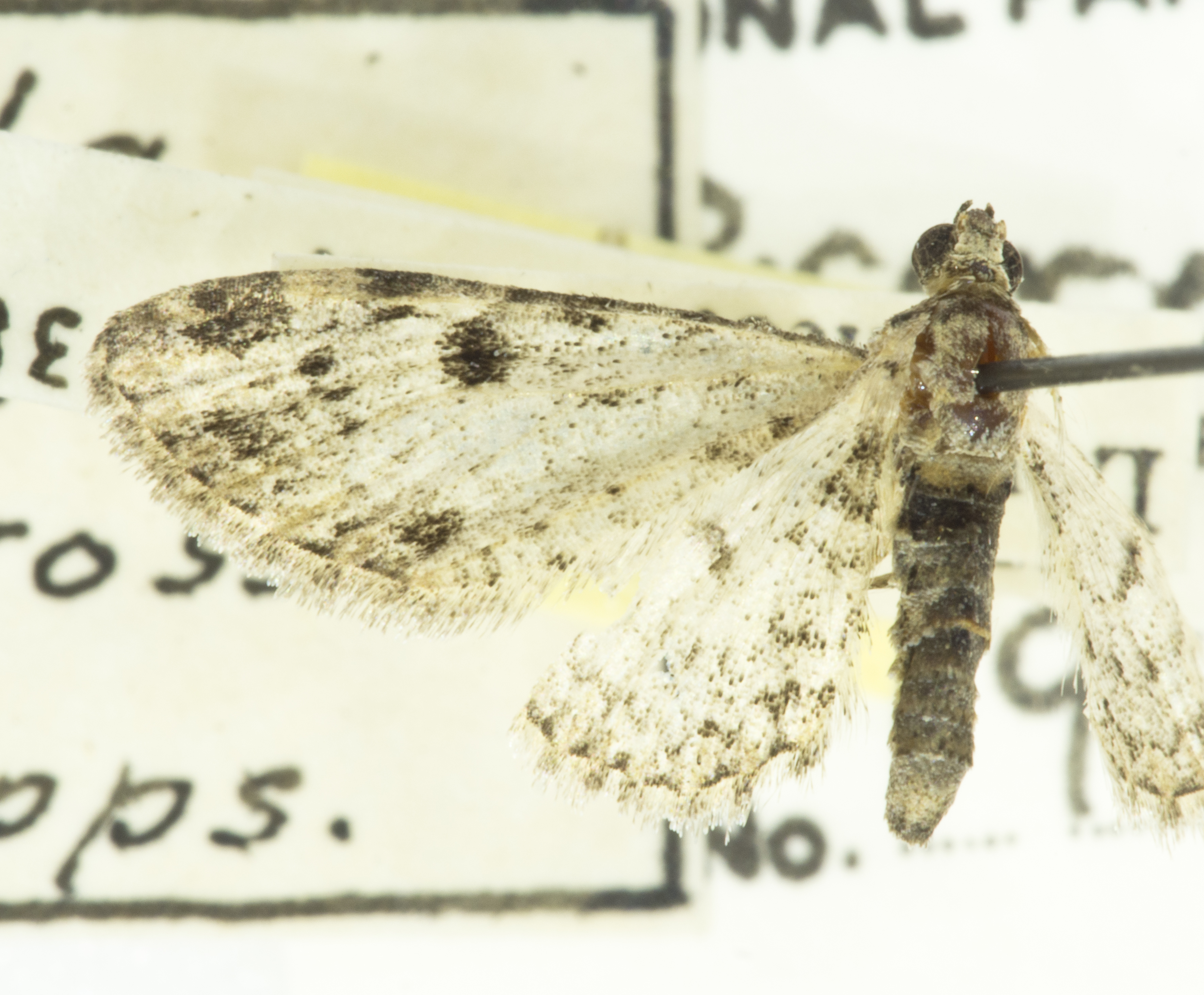

Scientific classification
- Domain: Eukaryota
- Kingdom: Animalia
- Phylum: Arthropoda
- Class: Insecta
- Order: Lepidoptera
- Family: Geometridae
- Genus: Prorella
- Species: P. discoidalis

Binomial name
- Prorella discoidalis (Grossbeck, 1908)

Synonyms
- Gymnoscelis discoidalis Grossbeck, 1908

= Prorella discoidalis =

Species of moth

Prorella discoidalis is a moth in the family Geometridae first described by John Arthur Grossbeck in 1908. It is found in the US states of Arizona, New Mexico and Utah.

The wingspan is about 17 mm. There seem to be two generations per year with adults on wing in June and again in August.
