= Syncosmia craspedozona =

Scientific classification
- Kingdom: Animalia
- Phylum: Arthropoda
- Clade: Pancrustacea
- Class: Insecta
- Order: Lepidoptera
- Family: Geometridae
- Genus: Syncosmia
- Species: S. craspedozona

Binomial name
- Syncosmia craspedozona (Prout, 1958)

Synonyms
- Chloroclystis craspedozona Prout, 1958; Chloroclystis venata Prout, 1958; Chloroclystis heanis Prout, 1958

Species of moth

Syncosmia craspedozona is a moth in the family Geometridae. It is found on Bali, Luzon and Seram.
