= Tripteridia latistriga =

Scientific classification
- Domain: Eukaryota
- Kingdom: Animalia
- Phylum: Arthropoda
- Class: Insecta
- Order: Lepidoptera
- Family: Geometridae
- Genus: Tripteridia
- Species: T. latistriga

Binomial name
- Tripteridia latistriga (Warren, 1906)

Synonyms
- Prosthetopteryx latistriga Warren, 1906; Micromia cophogona Prout, 1932

Species of moth

Tripteridia latistriga is a moth in the family Geometridae. It is found in New Guinea and on Borneo. The habitat consists of mountainous areas.
