= Prorella albida =

Scientific classification
- Domain: Eukaryota
- Kingdom: Animalia
- Phylum: Arthropoda
- Class: Insecta
- Order: Lepidoptera
- Family: Geometridae
- Genus: Prorella
- Species: P. albida

Binomial name
- Prorella albida (Cassino & Swett, 1923)

Synonyms
- Nasusina albida Cassino & Swett, 1923; Eupithecia ruthiata Cassino, 1927

Species of moth

Prorella albida is a moth in the family Geometridae first described by Samuel E. Cassino and Louis W. Swett in 1923. It is found in the US states of California, Utah, New Mexico, Colorado and south-western Texas.

The wingspan is about 14 mm. Adults have been recorded on wing in July, September and November.
