= Prorella mellisa =

Scientific classification
- Domain: Eukaryota
- Kingdom: Animalia
- Phylum: Arthropoda
- Class: Insecta
- Order: Lepidoptera
- Family: Geometridae
- Genus: Prorella
- Species: P. mellisa

Binomial name
- Prorella mellisa (Grossbeck, 1908)

Synonyms
- Gymnoscelis mellisa Grossbeck, 1908

Species of moth

Prorella mellisa is a moth in the family Geometridae first described by John Arthur Grossbeck in 1908. It is found in the US states of California, Arizona, Colorado and Montana. Adults have been recorded on wing in May and from July to October.
