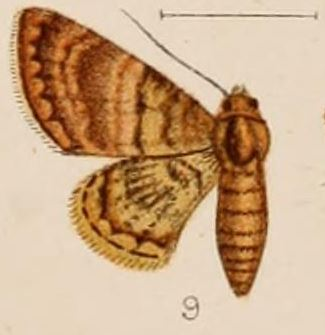

Scientific classification
- Domain: Eukaryota
- Kingdom: Animalia
- Phylum: Arthropoda
- Class: Insecta
- Order: Lepidoptera
- Family: Geometridae
- Tribe: Eupitheciini
- Genus: Hybridoneura; Warren, 1898

Synonyms
- Pseudomimetis Prout, 1928

= Hybridoneura =

Genus of moths

Hybridoneura is a genus of moths in the family Geometridae.

== Species ==
- Hybridoneura abnormis Warren, 1898
- Hybridoneura picta (Warren, 1901)
- Hybridoneura truncata Prout, 1958
