= Tripteridia albimixta =

Scientific classification
- Domain: Eukaryota
- Kingdom: Animalia
- Phylum: Arthropoda
- Class: Insecta
- Order: Lepidoptera
- Family: Geometridae
- Genus: Tripteridia
- Species: T. albimixta

Binomial name
- Tripteridia albimixta Warren, 1906

Species of moth

Tripteridia albimixta is a moth in the family Geometridae. It is found in New Guinea.
