= Onagrodes obscurata =

Scientific classification
- Domain: Eukaryota
- Kingdom: Animalia
- Phylum: Arthropoda
- Class: Insecta
- Order: Lepidoptera
- Family: Geometridae
- Genus: Onagrodes
- Species: O. obscurata

Binomial name
- Onagrodes obscurata Warren, 1896

Species of moth

Onagrodes obscurata is a moth in the family Geometridae. It is found in the north-eastern Himalayas.
