= Micrulia cinerea =

Scientific classification
- Domain: Eukaryota
- Kingdom: Animalia
- Phylum: Arthropoda
- Class: Insecta
- Order: Lepidoptera
- Family: Geometridae
- Genus: Micrulia
- Species: M. cinerea

Binomial name
- Micrulia cinerea (Warren, 1896)

Synonyms
- Opistheploce cinerea Warren, 1896

Species of moth

Micrulia cinerea is a moth in the family Geometridae. It is found on the Moluccas.
