= Carbia moderescens =

Scientific classification
- Kingdom: Animalia
- Phylum: Arthropoda
- Clade: Pancrustacea
- Class: Insecta
- Order: Lepidoptera
- Family: Geometridae
- Genus: Carbia
- Species: C. moderescens

Binomial name
- Carbia moderescens Holloway, 1997

Species of moth

Carbia moderescens is a moth in the family Geometridae. It is found on Borneo. The habitat consists of upper montane forests.

The length of the forewings is about 11 mm.
