= Micrulia subzebrina =

Scientific classification
- Kingdom: Animalia
- Phylum: Arthropoda
- Clade: Pancrustacea
- Class: Insecta
- Order: Lepidoptera
- Family: Geometridae
- Genus: Micrulia
- Species: M. subzebrina

Binomial name
- Micrulia subzebrina Holloway, 1997

Species of moth

Micrulia subzebrina is a moth in the family Geometridae. It is found on Borneo. The habitat consists of upper montane areas.

The length of the forewings is about 8 mm.
