= Carbia =

Scientific classification
- Kingdom: Animalia
- Phylum: Arthropoda
- Class: Insecta
- Order: Lepidoptera
- Family: Geometridae
- Tribe: Eupitheciini
- Genus: Carbia; Walker, 1866

Synonyms
- Leiocera Hampson, 1893

Genus of moths

Carbia is a genus of moths in the family Geometridae.

== Species ==
- Carbia brunnefacta Holloway, 1997
- Carbia calefacta Prout, 1941
- Carbia calescens Walker, 1866
- Carbia moderata (Walker, 1866)
- Carbia moderescens Holloway, 1997
- Carbia nexilinea (Warren, 1898)
- Carbia pulchrilinea (Walker, 1866)
