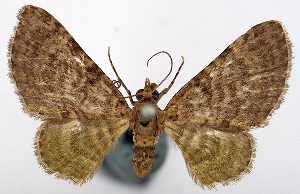

Scientific classification
- Domain: Eukaryota
- Kingdom: Animalia
- Phylum: Arthropoda
- Class: Insecta
- Order: Lepidoptera
- Family: Geometridae
- Genus: Onagrodes
- Species: O. recurva

Binomial name
- Onagrodes recurva Warren, 1907

Synonyms
- Adeta viridis Warren, 1907

= Onagrodes recurva =

Species of moth

Onagrodes recurva is a moth in the family Geometridae. It is found on Seram and on New Guinea.
