= Dasimatia =

Scientific classification
- Domain: Eukaryota
- Kingdom: Animalia
- Phylum: Arthropoda
- Class: Insecta
- Order: Lepidoptera
- Family: Geometridae
- Tribe: Eupitheciini
- Genus: Dasimatia; Warren, 1898
- Species: D. subusta

Binomial name
- Dasimatia subusta Warren, 1898

Genus of moths

Dasimatia is a monotypic moth genus in the family Geometridae. It contains only one species, Dasimatia subusta, which is found on Sulawesi.

The wingspan is about 28 mm. The forewings are ochreous, speckled and suffused with different shades of brown until the lines starting from olive-brown costal marks. The extreme base of the hindwings is pale, without speckling. There are two dark brown straight antemedian lines, the inner thick and diffuse, the second fine. There are also two dark brown postmedian lines in a brownish shade, the first distinctly and strongly dentate.
