= Pseudopolynesia hebe =

Scientific classification
- Domain: Eukaryota
- Kingdom: Animalia
- Phylum: Arthropoda
- Class: Insecta
- Order: Lepidoptera
- Family: Geometridae
- Genus: Pseudopolynesia
- Species: P. hebe

Binomial name
- Pseudopolynesia hebe (Bethune-Baker, 1915)

Synonyms
- Pomasia hebe Bethune-Baker, 1915; Pomasia praelustris Prout, 1933; Pomasia interrupta Prout, 1916; Pomasia phanoides Debauche, 1941

Species of moth

Pseudopolynesia hebe is a moth in the family Geometridae. It is found in New Guinea, as well as on Sulawesi and the southern Moluccas.
