= Eriopithex ishigakiensis =

Scientific classification
- Kingdom: Animalia
- Phylum: Arthropoda
- Class: Insecta
- Order: Lepidoptera
- Family: Geometridae
- Genus: Eriopithex
- Species: E. ishigakiensis

Binomial name
- Eriopithex ishigakiensis (Inoue, 1971)

Synonyms
- Chloroclystis ishigakiensis Inoue, 1971

Species of moth

Eriopithex ishigakiensis is a moth in the family Geometridae. It is found on the Ryukyu Islands.
