= Eupithystis =

Scientific classification
- Kingdom: Animalia
- Phylum: Arthropoda
- Clade: Pancrustacea
- Class: Insecta
- Order: Lepidoptera
- Family: Geometridae
- Tribe: Eupitheciini
- Genus: Eupithystis; Holloway, 1997
- Species: E. infuscata

Binomial name
- Eupithystis infuscata (Warren, 1899)

Synonyms
- Chloroclystis infuscata Warren, 1899; Tephroclystia foedatipennis Warren, 1901

Genus of moths

Eupithystis is a monotypic moth genus in the family Geometridae. It contains only one species, Eupithystis infuscata which is found on Borneo and Sumatra. The habitat consists of lowland forests.
