= Tripteridia novella =

Scientific classification
- Domain: Eukaryota
- Kingdom: Animalia
- Phylum: Arthropoda
- Class: Insecta
- Order: Lepidoptera
- Family: Geometridae
- Genus: Tripteridia
- Species: T. novella

Binomial name
- Tripteridia novella Warren, 1903

Species of moth

Tripteridia novella is a moth in the family Geometridae. It is found in New Guinea.
