= Tripteridia decens =

Scientific classification
- Domain: Eukaryota
- Kingdom: Animalia
- Phylum: Arthropoda
- Class: Insecta
- Order: Lepidoptera
- Family: Geometridae
- Genus: Tripteridia
- Species: T. decens

Binomial name
- Tripteridia decens (Warren, 1906)

Synonyms
- Tephroclystia decens Warren, 1906

Species of moth

Tripteridia decens is a moth in the family Geometridae. It is found in New Guinea.
