= Antimimistis cuprina =

Scientific classification
- Kingdom: Animalia
- Phylum: Arthropoda
- Clade: Pancrustacea
- Class: Insecta
- Order: Lepidoptera
- Family: Geometridae
- Genus: Antimimistis
- Species: A. cuprina

Binomial name
- Antimimistis cuprina Prout, 1958

Species of moth

Antimimistis cuprina is a moth in the family Geometridae. It is found in Sri Lanka.
