= Tripteridia scotochlaena =

Scientific classification
- Kingdom: Animalia
- Phylum: Arthropoda
- Clade: Pancrustacea
- Class: Insecta
- Order: Lepidoptera
- Family: Geometridae
- Genus: Tripteridia
- Species: T. scotochlaena

Binomial name
- Tripteridia scotochlaena (L. B. Prout, 1931)

Synonyms
- Micromia scotochlaena Prout, 1931

Species of moth

Tripteridia scotochlaena is a moth in the family Geometridae first described by Louis Beethoven Prout in 1931. It is found in New Guinea.
