= Symmimetis muscosa =

Scientific classification
- Domain: Eukaryota
- Kingdom: Animalia
- Phylum: Arthropoda
- Class: Insecta
- Order: Lepidoptera
- Family: Geometridae
- Genus: Symmimetis
- Species: S. muscosa

Binomial name
- Symmimetis muscosa Turner, 1907

Species of moth

Symmimetis muscosa is a moth in the family Geometridae. It is found in Queensland, New Guinea, Borneo and possibly Bali. The habitat consists of dipterocarp and lowland forests.
