= Micrulia gyroducta =

Scientific classification
- Domain: Eukaryota
- Kingdom: Animalia
- Phylum: Arthropoda
- Class: Insecta
- Order: Lepidoptera
- Family: Geometridae
- Genus: Micrulia
- Species: M. gyroducta

Binomial name
- Micrulia gyroducta (D. S. Fletcher, 1957)

Synonyms
- Calluga gyroducta D. S. Fletcher, 1957

Species of moth

Micrulia gyroducta is a moth in the family Geometridae. It was described by David Stephen Fletcher in 1957. It is found on the Louisiade Archipelago, Rennell Island and Mefor Island.
