= Carbia nexilinea =

Scientific classification
- Domain: Eukaryota
- Kingdom: Animalia
- Phylum: Arthropoda
- Class: Insecta
- Order: Lepidoptera
- Family: Geometridae
- Genus: Carbia
- Species: C. nexilinea

Binomial name
- Carbia nexilinea (Warren, 1898)

Synonyms
- Tephroclystia nexilinea Warren, 1898

Species of moth

Carbia nexilinea is a moth in the family Geometridae. It is found in the north-eastern Himalayas and on the Andamans and Borneo. The habitat consists of lowland areas.
