= Symmimetis heveli =

Scientific classification
- Kingdom: Animalia
- Phylum: Arthropoda
- Clade: Pancrustacea
- Class: Insecta
- Order: Lepidoptera
- Family: Geometridae
- Genus: Symmimetis
- Species: S. heveli

Binomial name
- Symmimetis heveli Holloway, 1997

Species of moth

Symmimetis heveli is a moth in the family Geometridae. It is found on Borneo and possibly Peninsular Malaysia.

The length of the forewings is about 10 mm.
