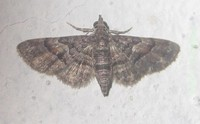

Scientific classification
- Kingdom: Animalia
- Phylum: Arthropoda
- Clade: Pancrustacea
- Class: Insecta
- Order: Lepidoptera
- Family: Geometridae
- Subfamily: Larentiinae
- Tribe: Eupitheciini
- Genus: Casuariclystis; Holloway, 1997
- Species: C. latifascia

Binomial name
- Casuariclystis latifascia (Walker, 1866)

Synonyms
- Eupithecia latifascia Walker, 1866; Eupithecia inexplicata Walker, 1866; Eupithecia perceptata Walker, 1866; Gymnoscelis nigella de Joannis, 1906; Chloroclystis metallicata T. B. Fletcher, 1910; Chloroclystis scintillata Prout 1932

= Casuariclystis =

Genus of moths

Casuariclystis is a genus of moths in the family Geometridae. It contains only one species, Casuariclystis latifascia, which is widespread. The range includes Borneo, the Andamans, Fiji, Rotuma Island, Vanuatu, New Caledonia, Hong Kong, the Ogasawara Islands, Kenya, Mauritius, Aldabra, and the Seychelles. In Borneo, it has been collected in montane forest, low elevation dipterocarp forest, and in dry lowland heath forest.

The larvae feed on Casuarina species, including Casuarina equisetifolia.
