= Eriopithex recensitaria =

Scientific classification
- Kingdom: Animalia
- Phylum: Arthropoda
- Class: Insecta
- Order: Lepidoptera
- Family: Geometridae
- Genus: Eriopithex
- Species: E. recensitaria

Binomial name
- Eriopithex recensitaria (Walker, 1862)

Synonyms
- Eupithecia recensitaria Walker, 1862; Chloroclystis recensitaria

Species of moth

Eriopithex recensitaria is a moth in the family Geometridae first described by Francis Walker in 1862. It is found in Sri Lanka, Taiwan, on Borneo and in the Australian state of Queensland.

== Description ==
The wingspan is about 10–16 mm. Palpi with the second joint reaching slightly beyond the frons. Hindwings with vein 3 from angle of cell or shortly stalked at vein 4. Male lack secondary sexual characteristics on the wings. Body rufous, with rufous suffusion. Forewings with traces of numerous waved lines. An oblique antemedial line angled in the cell and a postmedial line with blackish suffusion inside it, angled on veins 6 and 4, then oblique. A submarginal waved greyish line found with black marks on it at costa, and on each side of vein 6. Hindwings with round outer margin. Traces of waved lines can be seen. There is a postmedial line angled on vein 4 and a waved greyish submarginal line. Ventral side with curved postmedial and submarginal lines. Hindwings of male on ventrally clothed entirely with rough grey and black scales.
