= Prorella opinata =

Scientific classification
- Domain: Eukaryota
- Kingdom: Animalia
- Phylum: Arthropoda
- Class: Insecta
- Order: Lepidoptera
- Family: Geometridae
- Genus: Prorella
- Species: P. opinata

Binomial name
- Prorella opinata (Pearsall, 1909)

Synonyms
- Nasusina opinata Pearsall, 1909

Species of moth

Prorella opinata is a moth in the family Geometridae first described by Pearsall in 1909. It is found in the US states of Colorado, California, Arizona, New Mexico and Utah.

The wingspan is about 14 mm. Adults are small and gray. Adults have been recorded on wing in May and from July to October.
