= Symmimetis cristata =

Scientific classification
- Domain: Eukaryota
- Kingdom: Animalia
- Phylum: Arthropoda
- Class: Insecta
- Order: Lepidoptera
- Family: Geometridae
- Genus: Symmimetis
- Species: S. cristata

Binomial name
- Symmimetis cristata (Warren, 1897)

Synonyms
- Gymnoscelis cristata Warren, 1897; Neoscelis rivula Hampson, 1903; Neoscelidia rivula

Species of moth

Symmimetis cristata is a moth in the family Geometridae. It is found in Sri Lanka and India.

The larvae feed on the young leaves of Aglaia species.
