= Symmimetis kolopis =

Scientific classification
- Kingdom: Animalia
- Phylum: Arthropoda
- Clade: Pancrustacea
- Class: Insecta
- Order: Lepidoptera
- Family: Geometridae
- Genus: Symmimetis
- Species: S. kolopis

Binomial name
- Symmimetis kolopis Holloway, 1997

Species of moth

Symmimetis kolopis is a moth in the family Geometridae. It is found on Borneo. The habitat consists of upper montane forests.

The length of the forewings is 10–11 mm. Adults are rufous brown with a paler, yellowish ground colour.
