= Micromia =

Scientific classification
- Domain: Eukaryota
- Kingdom: Animalia
- Phylum: Arthropoda
- Class: Insecta
- Order: Lepidoptera
- Family: Geometridae
- Tribe: Eupitheciini
- Genus: Micromia; Warren, 1906
- Species: M. fulvipuncta

Binomial name
- Micromia fulvipuncta Warren, 1906

Genus of moths

Micromia is a monotypic moth genus in the family Geometridae. It contains only one species, Micromia fulvipuncta, which is found in New Guinea. Both the genus and species were first described by William Warren in 1906.
