= Prorella insipidata =

Scientific classification
- Domain: Eukaryota
- Kingdom: Animalia
- Phylum: Arthropoda
- Class: Insecta
- Order: Lepidoptera
- Family: Geometridae
- Genus: Prorella
- Species: P. insipidata

Binomial name
- Prorella insipidata (Pearsall, 1910)

Synonyms
- Nasusina insipidata Pearsall, 1910

Species of moth

Prorella insipidata is an American moth of the family Geometridae first described by Pearsall in 1910. It lives in Oregon, California, Arizona, New Mexico and Texas.

The wingspan is about 16 mm. Adults have been recorded on wing from July to October.
