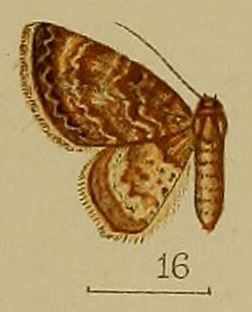

Scientific classification
- Kingdom: Animalia
- Phylum: Arthropoda
- Class: Insecta
- Order: Lepidoptera
- Family: Geometridae
- Genus: Micrulia
- Species: M. catocalaria

Binomial name
- Micrulia catocalaria (Snellen, 1881)

Synonyms
- Eupithecia catocalaria Snellen, 1881; Calluga catocalaria; Megatheca purpurea Warren, 1897; Gymnoscelis lobata Hampson, 1912

= Micrulia catocalaria =

Species of moth

Micrulia catocalaria is a moth in the family Geometridae. It is found on Sulawesi, New Guinea, the Philippines and in Sundaland and Sri Lanka. The habitat ranges from lowland to montane areas.
