= Pareupithecia =

Scientific classification
- Kingdom: Animalia
- Phylum: Arthropoda
- Clade: Pancrustacea
- Class: Insecta
- Order: Lepidoptera
- Family: Geometridae
- Tribe: Eupitheciini
- Genus: Pareupithecia; Mironov & Galsworthy, 2012
- Species: P. spadix

Binomial name
- Pareupithecia spadix (Inoue, 1955)

Synonyms
- Eupithecia spadix Inoue, 1955

Genus of moths

Pareupithecia is a genus of moths in the family Geometridae. It contains only one species, Pareupithecia spadix, which is found in the Russian Far East (southern Primorje), Korea, Japan (Honshu) and China (Shanxi).

The wingspan is about 20–23 mm (0.79–0.91 in).
