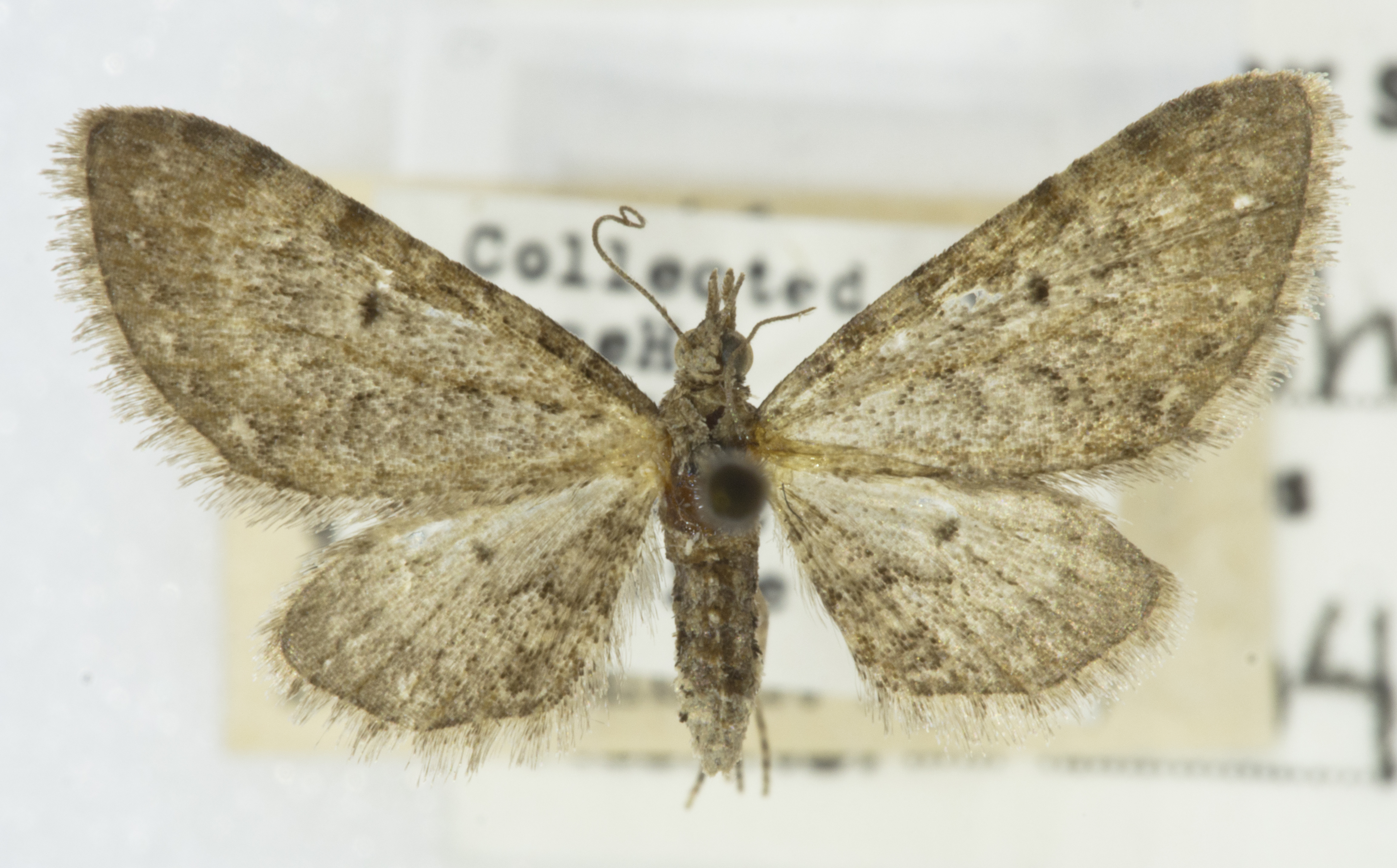
- Nasusina minuta

Scientific classification
- Domain: Eukaryota
- Kingdom: Animalia
- Phylum: Arthropoda
- Class: Insecta
- Order: Lepidoptera
- Family: Geometridae
- Tribe: Eupitheciini
- Genus: Nasusina; Pearsall, 1908

= Nasusina =

Genus of moths

Nasusina is a genus of moths in the family Geometridae.

== Species ==
- Nasusina inferior (Hulst, 1896)
- Nasusina mendicata (Barnes & McDunnough, 1918)
- Nasusina minuta (Hulst, 1896)
- Nasusina vallis Ferris, 2004
- Nasusina vaporata (Pearsall, 1912)
