= Micrulia tenuilinea =

Scientific classification
- Domain: Eukaryota
- Kingdom: Animalia
- Phylum: Arthropoda
- Class: Insecta
- Order: Lepidoptera
- Family: Geometridae
- Genus: Micrulia
- Species: M. tenuilinea

Binomial name
- Micrulia tenuilinea Warren, 1896

Synonyms
- Megatheca dentosa Warren, 1901

Species of moth

Micrulia tenuilinea is a moth in the family Geometridae. It is found in the Indo-Australian tropics, including Sri Lanka, India (Assam), Singapore, Queensland, Rotuma, as well as on Norfolk Island, Fiji and Samoa.
