= Carbia pulchrilinea =

Scientific classification
- Kingdom: Animalia
- Phylum: Arthropoda
- Class: Insecta
- Order: Lepidoptera
- Family: Geometridae
- Genus: Carbia
- Species: C. pulchrilinea

Binomial name
- Carbia pulchrilinea (Walker, 1866)

Synonyms
- Eupithecia pulchrilinea Walker, 1866; Leiocera axis Hampson, 1893; Pomasia moniliata Warren, 1893

Species of moth

Carbia pulchrilinea is a moth in the family Geometridae. The species was first described by Francis Walker in 1866. It is found in the Indian subregion, Sri Lanka and New Guinea, as well as on Borneo, the Mentawai Islands and the Bismarck Archipelago. The species is found from lowlands to the upper montane forest zone.

== Description ==
The wingspan is about 20 mm. Body fawn colored. Forewings with double sub-basal, antemedial, and postmedial waved white lines arising from ochreous specks found on the costa. There is a submarginal crenulate white line with four black lunules found on it below apex and a black streak crossing it above inner margin. Hindwings with antemedial and medial waved white lines. Three submarginal lines found with some black specks on them.
