= Prorella irremorata =

Scientific classification
- Domain: Eukaryota
- Kingdom: Animalia
- Phylum: Arthropoda
- Class: Insecta
- Order: Lepidoptera
- Family: Geometridae
- Genus: Prorella
- Species: P. irremorata

Binomial name
- Prorella irremorata (Dyar, 1923)

Synonyms
- Nasusina irremorata Dyar, 1923

Species of moth

Prorella irremorata is a moth in the family Geometridae first described by Harrison Gray Dyar Jr. in 1923. It is found in the United States in the desert regions of southern California, Nevada and Arizona.

The wingspan is about 15 mm. Adults have been recorded on wing from March to May and in September.
