= Carbia calescens =

Scientific classification
- Kingdom: Animalia
- Phylum: Arthropoda
- Class: Insecta
- Order: Lepidoptera
- Family: Geometridae
- Genus: Carbia
- Species: C. calescens

Binomial name
- Carbia calescens Walker, 1866

Species of moth

Carbia calescens is a moth in the family Geometridae. It is found on Borneo and Sumatra. The habitat consists of lowland areas.
