= Prorella gypsata =

Scientific classification
- Kingdom: Animalia
- Phylum: Arthropoda
- Class: Insecta
- Order: Lepidoptera
- Family: Geometridae
- Genus: Prorella
- Species: P. gypsata

Binomial name
- Prorella gypsata (Grote, 1882)

Synonyms
- Eupithecia gypsata Grote, 1882; Gymnocelis gypsata

Species of moth

Prorella gypsata is a moth in the family Geometridae first described by Augustus Radcliffe Grote in 1882. It is found in the US states of Colorado, New Mexico, Arizona and south-western Texas.
