= Ptychotheca =

Scientific classification
- Kingdom: Animalia
- Phylum: Arthropoda
- Class: Insecta
- Order: Lepidoptera
- Family: Geometridae
- Tribe: Eupitheciini
- Genus: Ptychotheca; Warren, 1906
- Species: P. pallidivirens

Binomial name
- Ptychotheca pallidivirens (Warren, 1903)

Synonyms
- Chloroclystis pallidivirens Warren, 1903; Chloroclystis pullivirens Prout, 1935

Genus of moths

Ptychotheca is a monotypic moth genus belonging to the family Geometridae. Its only species, Ptychotheca pallidivirens, is found in New Guinea. Both the genus and species were first described by William Warren, the genus in 1906 and the species in 1903.
