= Syncosmia discisuffusa =

Scientific classification
- Kingdom: Animalia
- Phylum: Arthropoda
- Clade: Pancrustacea
- Class: Insecta
- Order: Lepidoptera
- Family: Geometridae
- Genus: Syncosmia
- Species: S. discisuffusa

Binomial name
- Syncosmia discisuffusa (Holloway, 1976)

Synonyms
- Chloroclystis discisuffusa Holloway, 1976

Species of moth

Syncosmia discisuffusa is a moth in the family Geometridae. It is found on Borneo.

The wings are dark, pale brownish yellow fasciated with dark brown.
