= Carbia brunnefacta =

Scientific classification
- Kingdom: Animalia
- Phylum: Arthropoda
- Clade: Pancrustacea
- Class: Insecta
- Order: Lepidoptera
- Family: Geometridae
- Genus: Carbia
- Species: C. brunnefacta

Binomial name
- Carbia brunnefacta Holloway, 1997

Species of moth

Carbia brunnefacta is a moth in the family Geometridae. It is found on Borneo and possibly in Singapore. The habitat consists of lowland areas.

The length of the forewings is 9–10 mm.
