= Hybridoneura picta =

Scientific classification
- Domain: Eukaryota
- Kingdom: Animalia
- Phylum: Arthropoda
- Class: Insecta
- Order: Lepidoptera
- Family: Geometridae
- Genus: Hybridoneura
- Species: H. picta

Binomial name
- Hybridoneura picta (Warren, 1901)

Synonyms
- Gymnoscelis picta Warren, 1901; Micrulia pacifica Holloway, 1979; Gymnoscelis semiviridis Warren, 1897; Symmimetis sylvatica Turner, 1922; Pseudomimetis vailima Prout, 1958

Species of moth

Hybridoneura picta is a moth in the family Geometridae. It is found in the north-eastern Himalayas, New Guinea and Queensland, as well as on Borneo, Rotuma Island, New Caledonia and Samoa.

The wingspan is about 20 mm.
