= Symmimetis merceri =

Scientific classification
- Domain: Eukaryota
- Kingdom: Animalia
- Phylum: Arthropoda
- Class: Insecta
- Order: Lepidoptera
- Family: Geometridae
- Genus: Symmimetis
- Species: S. merceri

Binomial name
- Symmimetis merceri Robinson, 1975

Species of moth

Symmimetis merceri is a moth in the family Geometridae. It is found on Fiji.
