= Pseudopolynesia =

Scientific classification
- Kingdom: Animalia
- Phylum: Arthropoda
- Clade: Pancrustacea
- Class: Insecta
- Order: Lepidoptera
- Family: Geometridae
- Tribe: Eupitheciini
- Genus: Pseudopolynesia; Holloway, 1997

Genus of moths

Pseudopolynesia is a genus of moths in the family Geometridae.

== Species ==
- Pseudopolynesia amplificata (Walker, 1861)
- Pseudopolynesia hebe (Bethune-Baker, 1915)
