= Syncosmia seminotata =

Scientific classification
- Domain: Eukaryota
- Kingdom: Animalia
- Phylum: Arthropoda
- Class: Insecta
- Order: Lepidoptera
- Family: Geometridae
- Genus: Syncosmia
- Species: S. seminotata

Binomial name
- Syncosmia seminotata (Warren, 1898)

Synonyms
- Chloroclystis seminotata Warren, 1898

Species of moth

Syncosmia seminotata is a moth in the family Geometridae. It is found in New Guinea.
