= Onagrodes victoria =

Scientific classification
- Kingdom: Animalia
- Phylum: Arthropoda
- Clade: Pancrustacea
- Class: Insecta
- Order: Lepidoptera
- Family: Geometridae
- Genus: Onagrodes
- Species: O. victoria

Binomial name
- Onagrodes victoria Prout, 1958

Species of moth

Onagrodes victoria is a moth in the family Geometridae. It is found in southern Myanmar (the Tanintharyi Region) and on Borneo.
