= Nasusina vallis =

Scientific classification
- Domain: Eukaryota
- Kingdom: Animalia
- Phylum: Arthropoda
- Class: Insecta
- Order: Lepidoptera
- Family: Geometridae
- Genus: Nasusina
- Species: N. vallis

Binomial name
- Nasusina vallis Ferris, 2004

Species of moth

Nasusina vallis is a moth in the family Geometridae. It is found in the John Brown Canyon in Colorado. The habitat consists of an arid region with mesas and canyons.

The length of the forewings is 9–10 mm. Adults are probably on wing from mid to late May.
