= Hybridoneura truncata =

Scientific classification
- Kingdom: Animalia
- Phylum: Arthropoda
- Clade: Pancrustacea
- Class: Insecta
- Order: Lepidoptera
- Family: Geometridae
- Genus: Hybridoneura
- Species: H. truncata

Binomial name
- Hybridoneura truncata Prout, 1958

Species of moth

Hybridoneura truncata is a moth in the family Geometridae. It is found in New Guinea.
