= Tripteridia vinosa =

Scientific classification
- Domain: Eukaryota
- Kingdom: Animalia
- Phylum: Arthropoda
- Class: Insecta
- Order: Lepidoptera
- Family: Geometridae
- Genus: Tripteridia
- Species: T. vinosa

Binomial name
- Tripteridia vinosa (Warren, 1907)

Synonyms
- Prosthetopteryx vinosa Warren, 1907

Species of moth

Tripteridia vinosa is a moth in the family Geometridae. It is found in New Guinea.
