= Eriopithex lanaris =

Scientific classification
- Domain: Eukaryota
- Kingdom: Animalia
- Phylum: Arthropoda
- Class: Insecta
- Order: Lepidoptera
- Family: Geometridae
- Genus: Eriopithex
- Species: E. lanaris

Binomial name
- Eriopithex lanaris Warren, 1896

Synonyms
- Chloroclystis lanaris; Chloroclystis lanaris aequabilis Prout, 1958

Species of moth

Eriopithex lanaris is a moth in the family Geometridae. It is found in the north-eastern Himalayas, as well as on Peninsular Malaysia, Borneo, Bali, Sulawesi, the Sangihe Islands and in New Guinea and Queensland.

The moth is 14–16 mm. The forewings are pale dull grey, with darker grey lines. The hindwings are whitish grey, with a blackish cell-dot and postrnedian line.
