= Syncosmia layanga =

Scientific classification
- Kingdom: Animalia
- Phylum: Arthropoda
- Clade: Pancrustacea
- Class: Insecta
- Order: Lepidoptera
- Family: Geometridae
- Genus: Syncosmia
- Species: S. layanga

Binomial name
- Syncosmia layanga (Holloway, 1976)

Synonyms
- Chloroclystis layanga Holloway, 1976

Species of moth

Syncosmia layanga is a moth in the family Geometridae. It is found on Borneo.

It is the largest species in the genus Syncosmia.
