= Eriopithex =

Scientific classification
- Domain: Eukaryota
- Kingdom: Animalia
- Phylum: Arthropoda
- Class: Insecta
- Order: Lepidoptera
- Family: Geometridae
- Tribe: Eupitheciini
- Genus: Eriopithex; Warren, 1896

Genus of moths

Eriopithex is a genus of moths in the family Geometridae first described by Warren in 1896.

== Species ==
- Eriopithex ishigakiensis (Inoue, 1971)
- Eriopithex lanaris Warren, 1896
- Eriopithex recensitaria (Walker, 1862)
