= Prorella artestata =

Scientific classification
- Kingdom: Animalia
- Phylum: Arthropoda
- Clade: Pancrustacea
- Class: Insecta
- Order: Lepidoptera
- Family: Geometridae
- Genus: Prorella
- Species: P. artestata

Binomial name
- Prorella artestata (Grossbeck, 1908)

Synonyms
- Gymnoscelis artestata Grossbeck, 1908

Species of moth

Prorella artestata is a moth in the family Geometridae first described by John Arthur Grossbeck in 1908. It is found in the US states of Arizona and Texas.

The wingspan is about 17 mm. Adults have been recorded on wing in August and September and from May to June.
