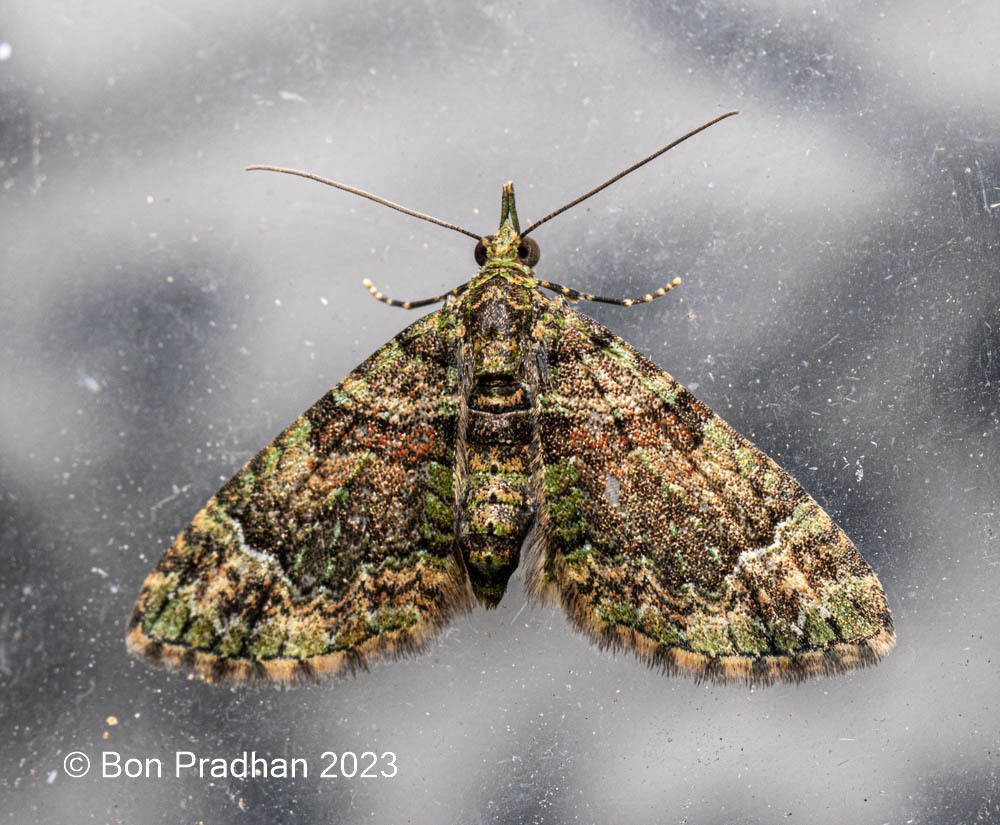

Scientific classification
- Domain: Eukaryota
- Kingdom: Animalia
- Phylum: Arthropoda
- Class: Insecta
- Order: Lepidoptera
- Family: Geometridae
- Genus: Syncosmia
- Species: S. patinata

Binomial name
- Syncosmia patinata Warren, 1897

= Syncosmia patinata =

Species of moth

Syncosmia patinata is a species of moth in the family Geometridae. It is found in the north-eastern Himalayas.
