= Carbia calefacta =

Scientific classification
- Kingdom: Animalia
- Phylum: Arthropoda
- Clade: Pancrustacea
- Class: Insecta
- Order: Lepidoptera
- Family: Geometridae
- Genus: Carbia
- Species: C. calefacta

Binomial name
- Carbia calefacta Prout, 1941

Species of moth

Carbia calefacta is a moth in the family Geometridae. It is found on Borneo. The habitat consists of mountainous areas.
