= Mnesiloba intentata =

Scientific classification
- Kingdom: Animalia
- Phylum: Arthropoda
- Class: Insecta
- Order: Lepidoptera
- Family: Geometridae
- Genus: Mnesiloba
- Species: M. intentata

Binomial name
- Mnesiloba intentata (Walker, 1866)

Synonyms
- Eupithecia intentata Walker, 1866; Chloroclystis intentata; Eupithecia partitecta Prout, 1931

Species of moth

Mnesiloba intentata is a moth of the family Geometridae first described by Francis Walker in 1866. It is known from Borneo, Java, Peninsular Malaysia, Luzon and New Guinea.

== Description ==
The wingspan is about 22 mm. Adults are green, irrorated (sprinkled) with black. The forewings have a slightly curved black subbasal line with two faint lines between it and the medial area, which is thickly irrorated with black, edged by black lines, and has three minutely waved black lines on it. The hindwings are pale fuscous.
