= Polysphalia =

Scientific classification
- Kingdom: Animalia
- Phylum: Arthropoda
- Class: Insecta
- Order: Lepidoptera
- Family: Geometridae
- Tribe: Eupitheciini
- Genus: Polysphalia; Warren, 1906
- Species: P. cristigera

Binomial name
- Polysphalia cristigera Warren, 1906

Synonyms
- Chloroclystis cristigera

Genus of moths

Polysphalia is a monotypic moth genus in the family Geometridae. Its only species, Polysphalia cristigera, is found in New Guinea. Both the genus and species were first described by William Warren in 1906.
