= Antimimistis subteracta =

Scientific classification
- Kingdom: Animalia
- Phylum: Arthropoda
- Clade: Pancrustacea
- Class: Insecta
- Order: Lepidoptera
- Family: Geometridae
- Genus: Antimimistis
- Species: A. subteracta

Binomial name
- Antimimistis subteracta Prout, 1925

Species of moth

Antimimistis subteracta is a moth in the family Geometridae. It is found in India (the Khasia Hills).
