= Scintillithex =

Scientific classification
- Kingdom: Animalia
- Phylum: Arthropoda
- Clade: Pancrustacea
- Class: Insecta
- Order: Lepidoptera
- Family: Geometridae
- Tribe: Eupitheciini
- Genus: Scintillithex; Holloway, 1997
- Species: S. glaucisparsa

Binomial name
- Scintillithex glaucisparsa (Moore, 1887)

Synonyms
- Propithex glaucisparsa Prout, 1932; Propithex glaucisparsa scintillulata Prout, 1941

Genus of moths

Scintillithex is a genus of moths in the family Geometridae. It contains only one species, Scintillithex glaucisparsa, which is found on Borneo and Peninsular Malaysia.

== Subspecies ==
- Scintillithex glaucisparsa glaucisparsa (Borneo)
- Scintillithex glaucisparsa scintillulata (Prout, 1941) (Peninsular Malaysia)
