= Dissolophodes =

Scientific classification
- Domain: Eukaryota
- Kingdom: Animalia
- Phylum: Arthropoda
- Class: Insecta
- Order: Lepidoptera
- Family: Geometridae
- Tribe: Eupitheciini
- Genus: Dissolophodes; Warren, 1907
- Species: D. curvimacula

Binomial name
- Dissolophodes curvimacula (Warren, 1906)

Synonyms
- Tephroclystia curvimacula Warren, 1906

Genus of moths

Dissolophodes is a genus of moths in the family Geometridae. It contains only one species, Dissolophodes curvimacula, which is found on New Guinea.
