= Pseudopolynesia amplificata =

Scientific classification
- Kingdom: Animalia
- Phylum: Arthropoda
- Class: Insecta
- Order: Lepidoptera
- Family: Geometridae
- Genus: Pseudopolynesia
- Species: P. amplificata

Binomial name
- Pseudopolynesia amplificata (Walker, 1861)

Synonyms
- Pomasia amplificata Walker, 1861

Species of moth

Pseudopolynesia amplificata is a moth in the family Geometridae. It is found on Borneo, Peninsular Malaysia and Luzon. The habitat consists of various lowland forest types, including dry heath forests.
