= Symmimetis confusa =

Scientific classification
- Domain: Eukaryota
- Kingdom: Animalia
- Phylum: Arthropoda
- Class: Insecta
- Order: Lepidoptera
- Family: Geometridae
- Genus: Symmimetis
- Species: S. confusa

Binomial name
- Symmimetis confusa (Warren, 1906)

Synonyms
- Adeta confusa Warren, 1906

Species of moth

Symmimetis confusa is a moth in the family Geometridae. It is found in New Guinea.
