= Girida =

Scientific classification
- Kingdom: Animalia
- Phylum: Arthropoda
- Clade: Pancrustacea
- Class: Insecta
- Order: Lepidoptera
- Family: Geometridae
- Tribe: Eupitheciini
- Genus: Girida; Mironov & Galsworthy, 2012

Genus of moths

Girida is a genus of moths in the family Geometridae. The genus occurs in Sub-Saharan Africa and in South to East Asia and western Oceania.

== Species ==
There are two recognized species:

- Girida rigida (Swinhoe, 1892)
- Girida sporadica (Prout, 1932)
