= Otucha =

Scientific classification
- Domain: Eukaryota
- Kingdom: Animalia
- Phylum: Arthropoda
- Class: Insecta
- Order: Lepidoptera
- Family: Geometridae
- Tribe: Eupitheciini
- Genus: Otucha; Warren, 1907
- Species: O. adminiculata

Binomial name
- Otucha adminiculata Warren, 1907

Synonyms
- Micromia adminiculata

Genus of moths

Otucha is a genus of moths in the family Geometridae. It contains only one species, Otucha adminiculata, which is found on New Guinea.
