= Symmimetis thorectes =

Scientific classification
- Kingdom: Animalia
- Phylum: Arthropoda
- Clade: Pancrustacea
- Class: Insecta
- Order: Lepidoptera
- Family: Geometridae
- Genus: Symmimetis
- Species: S. thorectes

Binomial name
- Symmimetis thorectes Prout, 1934

Species of moth

Symmimetis thorectes is a moth in the family Geometridae. It is found on Fiji.
