= Prorella =

Scientific classification
- Domain: Eukaryota
- Kingdom: Animalia
- Phylum: Arthropoda
- Class: Insecta
- Order: Lepidoptera
- Family: Geometridae
- Tribe: Eupitheciini
- Genus: Prorella; Barnes & McDunnough, 1918

Genus of moths

Prorella is a genus of moths in the family Geometridae erected by William Barnes and James Halliday McDunnough in 1918.

== Species ==
- Prorella albida (Cassino & Swett, 1923)
- Prorella artestata (Grossbeck, 1908)
- Prorella desperata (Hulst, 1896)
- Prorella discoidalis (Grossbeck, 1908)
- Prorella emmedonia (Grossbeck, 1908)
- Prorella gypsata (Grote, 1882)
- Prorella insipidata (Pearsall, 1910)
- Prorella irremorata (Dyar, 1923)
- Prorella leucata (Hulst, 1896)
- Prorella mellisa (Grossbeck, 1908)
- Prorella ochrocarneata McDunnough, 1949
- Prorella opinata (Pearsall, 1909)
- Prorella protoptata (McDunnough, 1938)
- Prorella remorata (Grossbeck, 1907)
- Prorella tremorata McDunnough, 1949
