= Nasusina mendicata =

Scientific classification
- Kingdom: Animalia
- Phylum: Arthropoda
- Class: Insecta
- Order: Lepidoptera
- Family: Geometridae
- Genus: Nasusina
- Species: N. mendicata

Binomial name
- Nasusina mendicata (Barnes & McDunnough, 1918)

Synonyms
- Eupithecia mendicata Barnes & McDunnough, 1918

Species of moth

Nasusina mendicata is a moth in the family Geometridae first described by William Barnes and James Halliday McDunnough in 1918. It is found in the US in southern and central California, extending up the coast as far as Sonoma and Napa counties.

The wingspan is about 12 mm. Adults have been recorded on wing from March to August and in October.
