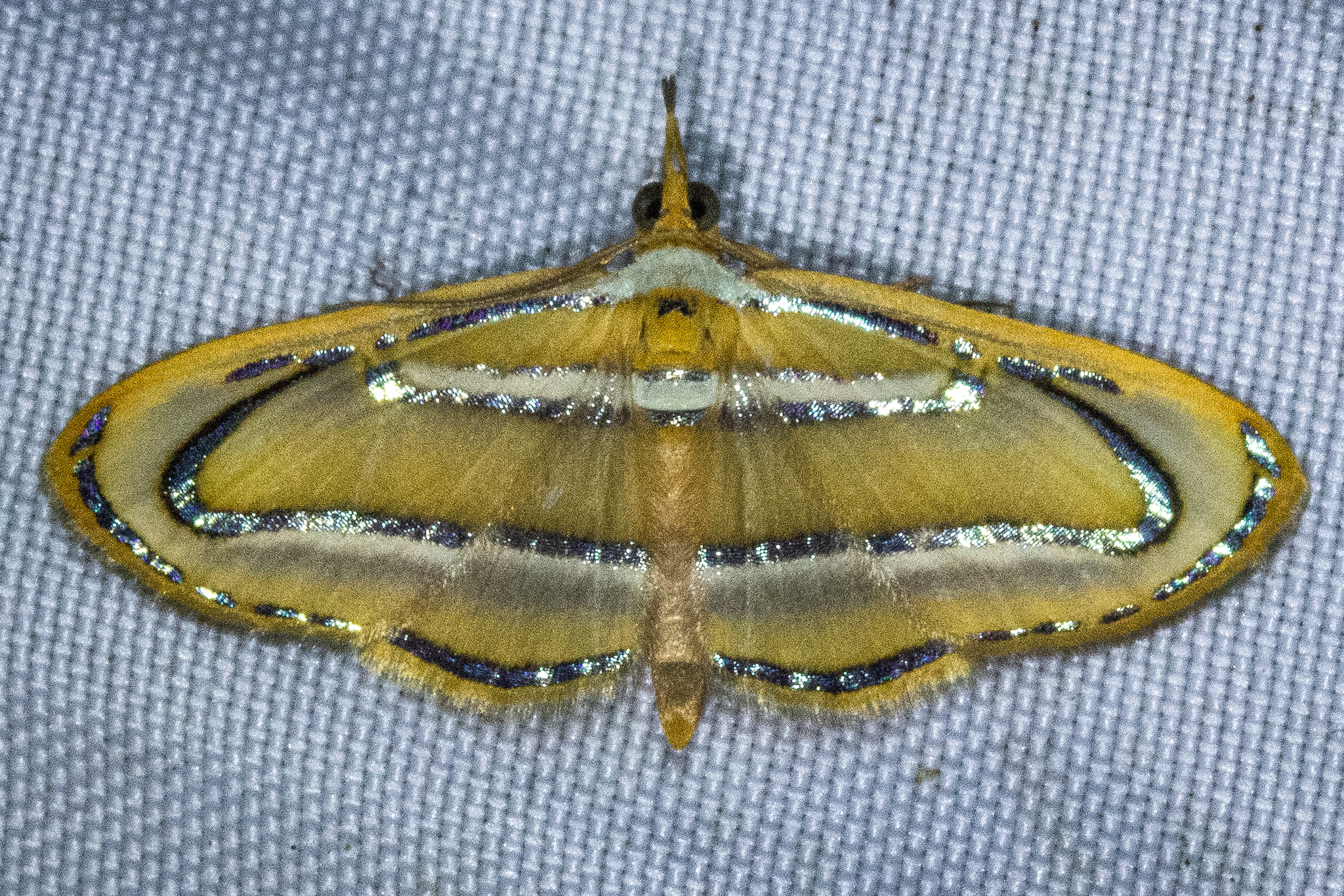

Scientific classification
- Kingdom: Animalia
- Phylum: Arthropoda
- Clade: Pancrustacea
- Class: Insecta
- Order: Lepidoptera
- Family: Geometridae
- Genus: Chrysoclystis
- Species: C. morbosa

Binomial name
- Chrysoclystis morbosa Prout, 1926

= Chrysoclystis morbosa =

Species of moth

Chrysoclystis morbosa is a species of moth in the family Geometridae. It is found on Peninsular Malaysia and Borneo. The habitat consists of forests, including lowland forests, alluvial forests and limestone forests.
