= Ardonis chlorophilata =

Scientific classification
- Kingdom: Animalia
- Phylum: Arthropoda
- Class: Insecta
- Order: Lepidoptera
- Family: Geometridae
- Genus: Ardonis
- Species: A. chlorophilata

Binomial name
- Ardonis chlorophilata (Walker, 1863)

Synonyms
- Eupithecia chlorophilata Walker, 1863

Species of moth

Ardonis chlorophilata is a moth in the family Geometridae first described by Francis Walker in 1863. It is found in Bhutan and India.

The wingspan is about 26 mm. The forewings have some dark rufous at the base of the costa, as well as triangular medial and smaller postmedial patches and a quadrate apical patch. The costal half of the hindwings is white, with a black mark. The inner area is green, with a dark base and three indistinct waved lines.
