= Prorella tremorata =

Scientific classification
- Domain: Eukaryota
- Kingdom: Animalia
- Phylum: Arthropoda
- Class: Insecta
- Order: Lepidoptera
- Family: Geometridae
- Genus: Prorella
- Species: P. tremorata

Binomial name
- Prorella tremorata McDunnough, 1949

Species of moth

Prorella tremorata is a moth in the family Geometridae first described by James Halliday McDunnough in 1949. It is found in the US states of California and Nevada.

The wingspan is about 16 mm. Adults have been recorded on wing in February, April and October.
