= Ardonis =

Scientific classification
- Kingdom: Animalia
- Phylum: Arthropoda
- Class: Insecta
- Order: Lepidoptera
- Family: Geometridae
- Tribe: Eupitheciini
- Genus: Ardonis; Moore, 1888

Synonyms
- Ceratorhynchus Hampson, 1893 (preocc.); Thamnocausta Warren, 1903

Genus of moths

Ardonis is a genus of moths in the family Geometridae.

== Species ==
- Ardonis chlorophilata (Walker, 1863)
- Ardonis dentifera Warren, 1906
- Ardonis filicata (Swinhoe, 1892)
- Ardonis malachitis (Warren, 1903)
- Ardonis thaumasta (Prout, 1935)
