= Symmimetis =

Scientific classification
- Domain: Eukaryota
- Kingdom: Animalia
- Phylum: Arthropoda
- Class: Insecta
- Order: Lepidoptera
- Family: Geometridae
- Tribe: Eupitheciini
- Genus: Symmimetis; Turner, 1907

Synonyms
- Neoscelis Hampson, 1903 (preocc.); Neoscelidia de Joannis, 1929

Genus of moths

Symmimetis is a genus of moths in the family Geometridae.

== Species ==
- Symmimetis confusa (Warren, 1906)
- Symmimetis cristata (Warren, 1897)
- Symmimetis heveli Holloway, 1997
- Symmimetis kolopis Holloway, 1997
- Symmimetis merceri Robinson, 1975
- Symmimetis muscosa Turner, 1907
- Symmimetis thorectes Prout, 1934
