= Syncosmia xanthocomes =

Scientific classification
- Kingdom: Animalia
- Phylum: Arthropoda
- Clade: Pancrustacea
- Class: Insecta
- Order: Lepidoptera
- Family: Geometridae
- Genus: Syncosmia
- Species: S. xanthocomes

Binomial name
- Syncosmia xanthocomes (Prout, 1926)

Synonyms
- Rhinoprora xanthocomes Prout, 1926; Chloroclystis xanthocomes

Species of moth

Syncosmia xanthocomes is a moth in the family Geometridae. It is found in the north-eastern Himalayas, Burma and on Borneo and Bali.

The wings have a bone-white ground colour with dark brown fasciation.
