= Micrulia rufula =

Scientific classification
- Domain: Eukaryota
- Kingdom: Animalia
- Phylum: Arthropoda
- Class: Insecta
- Order: Lepidoptera
- Family: Geometridae
- Genus: Micrulia
- Species: M. rufula

Binomial name
- Micrulia rufula (Warren, 1899)

Synonyms
- Opistheploce rufula Warren, 1899

Species of moth

Micrulia rufula is a moth in the family Geometridae. It is found in New Guinea.
