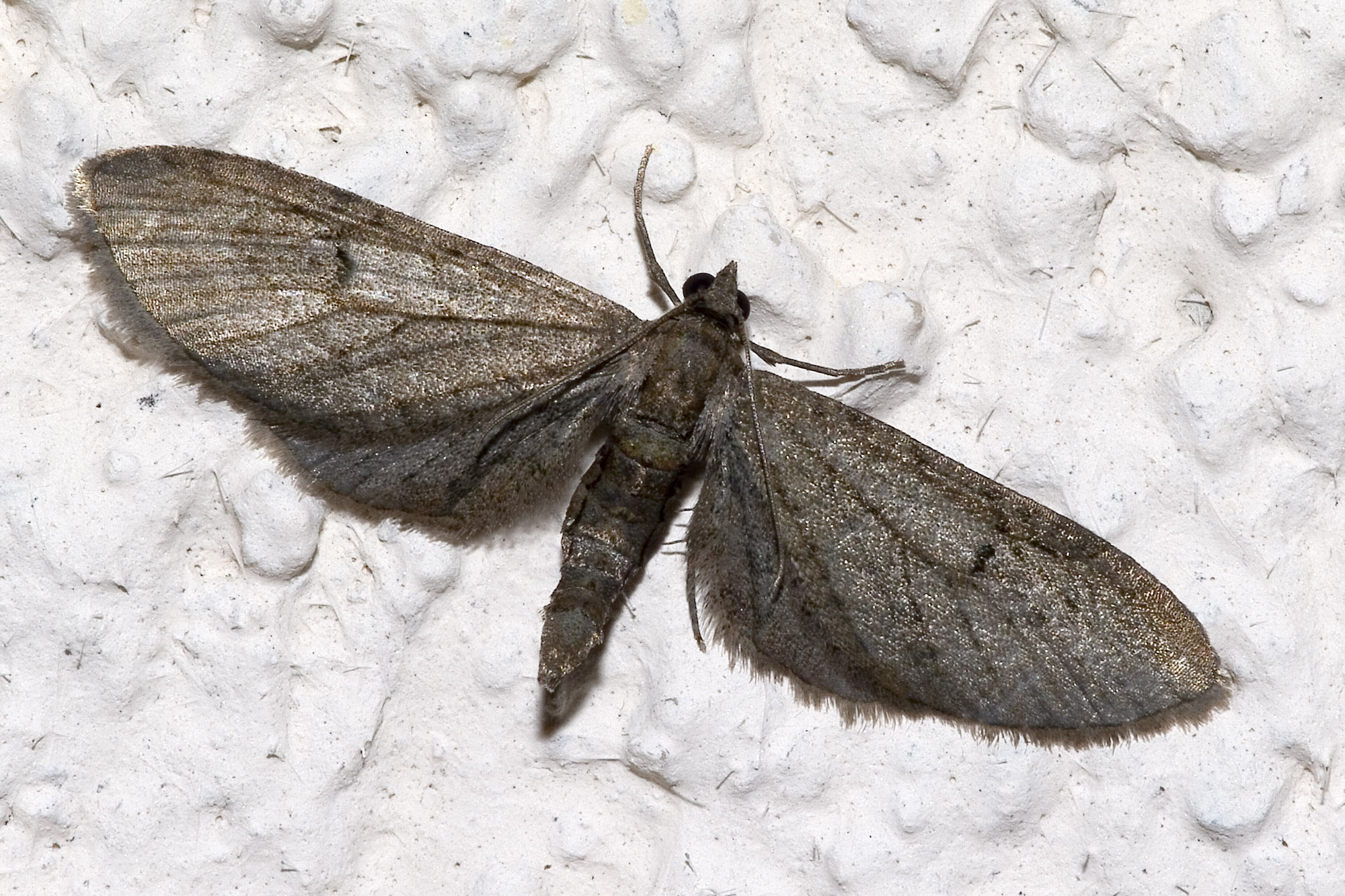
- Eupithecia innotata

Scientific classification
- Domain: Eukaryota
- Kingdom: Animalia
- Phylum: Arthropoda
- Class: Insecta
- Order: Lepidoptera
- Family: Geometridae
- Subfamily: Larentiinae
- Tribe: Eupitheciini; Tutt, 1896

Synonyms
- Tephroclystiini Warren, 1895; Chloroclystini Mironov, 1990

= Eupitheciini =

Tribe of moths

Eupitheciini is a tribe of geometer moths under subfamily Larentiinae, often referred to as pugs. The tribe was described by Tutt in 1896.

== Diversity ==
The tribe consists of about 47 genera, 15 of which are monotypic.

== Recognized genera ==
- Aepylopha Turner, 1942
- Antimimistis Turner, 1922
- Ardonis Moore, 1888
- Axinoptera Hampson, 1893
- Bosara Walker, 1866
- Calluga Moore, [1887]
- Carbia Walker, 1866
- Casuariclystis Holloway, 1997
- Celaenaclystis Holloway, 1997
- Chloroclystis Hübner, [1825]
- Chrysoclystis Warren, 1896
- Dasimatia Warren, 1898
- Dissolophodes Warren, 1907
- Eupithecia Curtis, 1825
- Eupithystis Holloway, 1997
- Eriopithex Warren, 1896
- Eva Vojnits, 1981
- Girida Mironov & Galsworthy, 2012
- Glaucoclystis Holloway, 1997
- Gymnoscelis Mabille, 1868
- Hybridoneura Warren, 1898
- Mariaba Walker, 1866
- Mesocolpia Warren, 1901
- Mesoptila Meyrick, 1891
- Microdes Guenée, 1857
- Micromia Warren, 1906
- Micrulia Warren, 1896
- Mnesiloba Warren, 1901
- Nasusina Pearsall, 1908
- Onagrodes Warren, 1896
- Otucha Warren, 1907
- Pareupithecia Mironov & Galsworthy, 2012
- Pasiphila Warren, 1895
- Pasiphilodes Warren, 1895
- Phrissogonus Butler, 1882
- Polysphalia Warren, 1906
- Pomasia Guenee, 1857
- Prorella Barnes & McDunnough, 1918
- Pseudopolynesia Holloway, 1997
- Ptychotheca Warren, 1906
- Pycnoloma Warren, 1906
- Rhinoprora Warren, 1895
- Scintillithex Holloway, 1997
- Sigilliclystis Galsworthy, 1999
- Spiralisigna Holloway, 1997
- Symmimetis Turner, 1907
- Syncosmia Warren, 1897
- Tripteridia Warren, 1903
- Ziridava Walker, 1863

== Former genera ==
- Collix Guenée in Boisduval & Guenée, 1857 (now in Melanthiini)
- Eois Hübner, 1818 (now in Asthenini)
- Parasthena Warren, 1902 (now in Asthenini)
- Poecilasthena Warren, 1894 (now in Asthenini)
- Polynesia Swinhoe, 1892 (now in Asthenini)
- Pseudocollix Warren, 1895 (now in Melanthiini)
