= Prorella ochrocarneata =

Scientific classification
- Domain: Eukaryota
- Kingdom: Animalia
- Phylum: Arthropoda
- Class: Insecta
- Order: Lepidoptera
- Family: Geometridae
- Genus: Prorella
- Species: P. ochrocarneata

Binomial name
- Prorella ochrocarneata McDunnough, 1949

Species of moth

Prorella ochrocarneata is a moth in the family Geometridae first described by James Halliday McDunnough in 1949. It is found in the US state of Arizona.

The wingspan is about 17 mm. Adults have been recorded on wing in August.
