= Syncosmia eugerys =

Scientific classification
- Kingdom: Animalia
- Phylum: Arthropoda
- Clade: Pancrustacea
- Class: Insecta
- Order: Lepidoptera
- Family: Geometridae
- Genus: Syncosmia
- Species: S. eugerys

Binomial name
- Syncosmia eugerys (Prout, 1929)

Synonyms
- Chloroclystis eugerys Prout, 1929

Species of moth

Syncosmia eugerys is a moth in the family Geometridae. It is found in New Guinea and on Seram.
