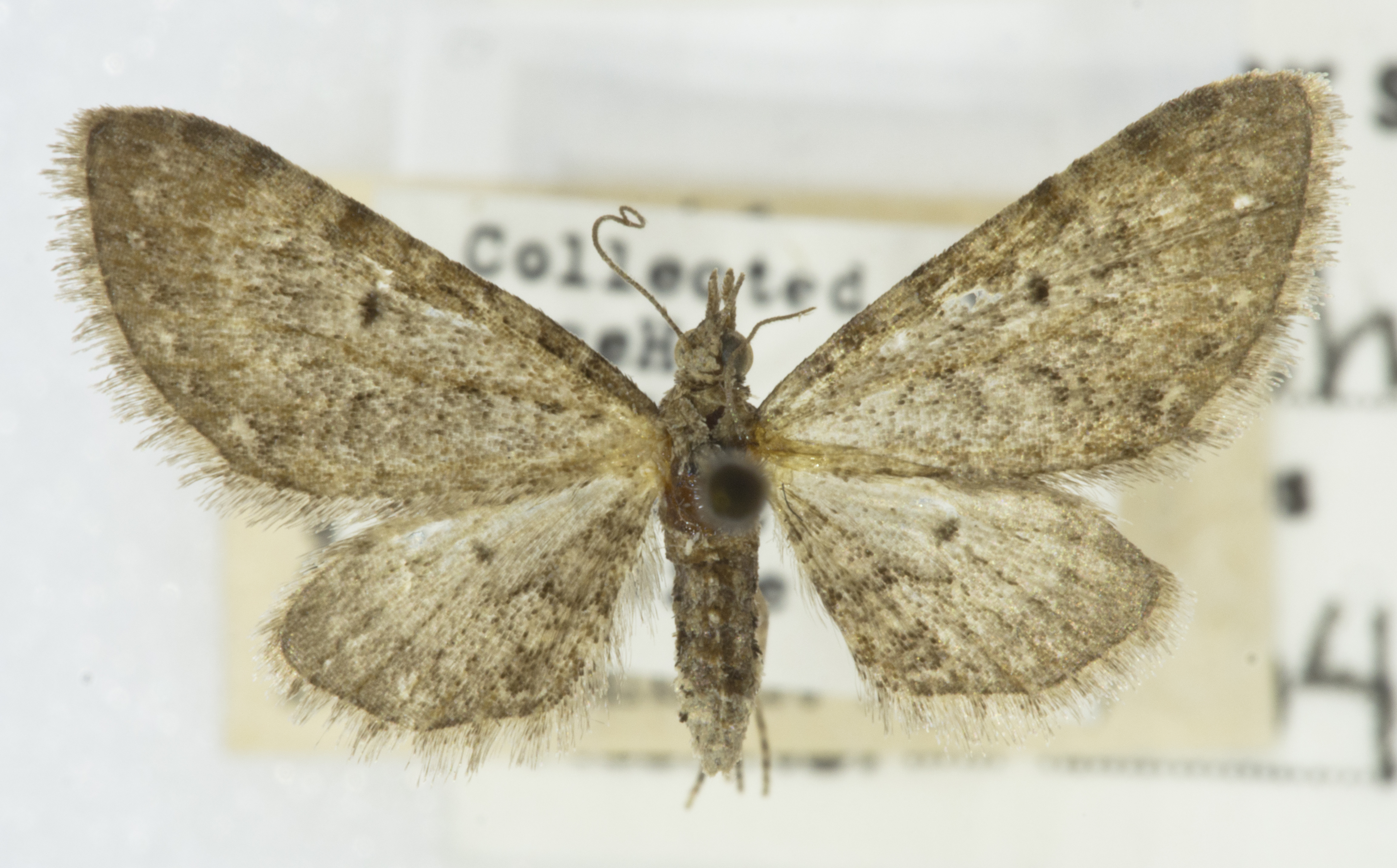
- Specimen from the Mojave Desert

Scientific classification
- Kingdom: Animalia
- Phylum: Arthropoda
- Class: Insecta
- Order: Lepidoptera
- Family: Geometridae
- Genus: Nasusina
- Species: N. minuta

Binomial name
- Nasusina minuta (Hulst, 1896)

Synonyms
- Gymnoscelis minuta Hulst, 1896

= Nasusina minuta =

Species of moth

Nasusina minuta is a moth in the family Geometridae first described by George Duryea Hulst in 1896. It is found in the United States in the desert regions of southern California, western Arizona and Nevada.

The wingspan is about 14–16 mm. Adults have been recorded on wing from March to June and in August and in November.
