= Eva (moth) =

Scientific classification
- Kingdom: Animalia
- Phylum: Arthropoda
- Clade: Pancrustacea
- Class: Insecta
- Order: Lepidoptera
- Family: Geometridae
- Genus: Eva; Vojnits, 1981
- Species: E. flexa

Binomial name
- Eva flexa Vojnits, 1981

Synonyms
- Eva petulans Vojnits, 1981 (unavailable name)

Genus of moths

Eva is a genus of moth in the family Geometridae. It contains one species, Eva flexa. A second species, Eva petulans Vojnits, 1981 is considered unavailable by Mironov and Galsworthy who redescribed the genus in 2012 and argued that the original species description of Eva petulans was based on a mixture of materials representing four accepted species, among them Eva flexa. However, it is treated as valid by the Online Taxonomic Facility of Geometridae.

Eva flexa occurs in southwestern China in Tibet and Yunnan.
