= Girida sporadica =

Scientific classification
- Kingdom: Animalia
- Phylum: Arthropoda
- Clade: Pancrustacea
- Class: Insecta
- Order: Lepidoptera
- Family: Geometridae
- Genus: Girida
- Species: G. sporadica

Binomial name
- Girida sporadica (Prout, 1932)

Synonyms
- Eupithecia rigida sporadica Prout, 1932

Species of moth

Girida sporadica is a moth in the family Geometridae. It is found in eastern Africa, where it has been recorded from Ethiopia, Kenya, Rwanda, Uganda, Zimbabwe, and Madagascar. The larvae feed on Pterolobium stellatum (Fabaceae).
