= Antimimistis illaudata =

Scientific classification
- Domain: Eukaryota
- Kingdom: Animalia
- Phylum: Arthropoda
- Class: Insecta
- Order: Lepidoptera
- Family: Geometridae
- Genus: Antimimistis
- Species: A. illaudata

Binomial name
- Antimimistis illaudata Turner, 1922

Species of moth

Antimimistis illaudata is a moth in the family Geometridae. It is found in Queensland, Australia.
