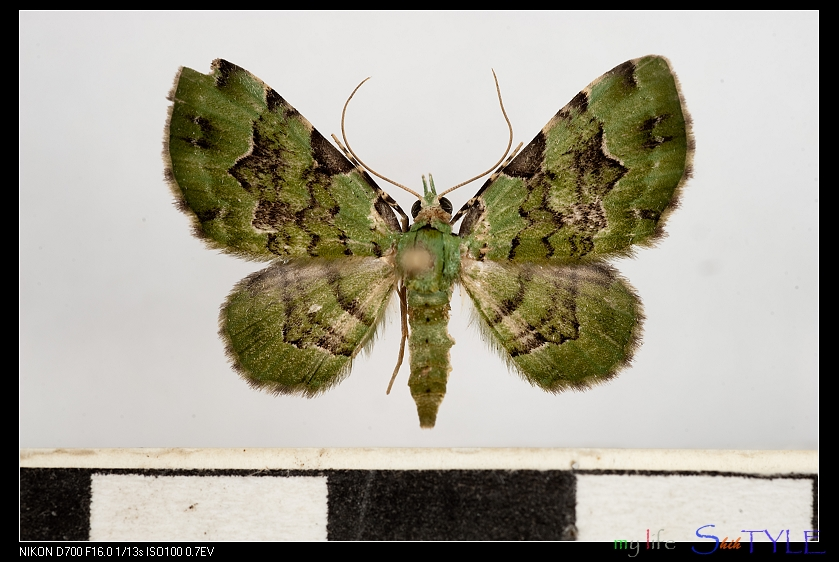

Scientific classification
- Domain: Eukaryota
- Kingdom: Animalia
- Phylum: Arthropoda
- Class: Insecta
- Order: Lepidoptera
- Family: Geometridae
- Genus: Ardonis
- Species: A. filicata

Binomial name
- Ardonis filicata (C. Swinhoe, 1892)

Synonyms
- Eupithecia filicata C. Swinhoe, 1892; Ceratorhynchus deletarius Hampson, 1893; Chloroclystis mochleutes L. B. Prout, 1958

= Ardonis filicata =

Species of moth

Ardonis filicata is a moth in the family Geometridae first described by Charles Swinhoe in 1892. It is found in the north-eastern Himalayas and Borneo and Sulawesi.

The wingspan is about 30 mm. Adults are green. The forewings have a black patch on the base of the costa and irregular black antemedial, medial and postmedial lines. The hindwings have a curved black antemedial line.

== Subspecies ==
- Ardonis filicata filicata (north-eastern Himalaya, Borneo)
- Ardonis filicata mochleutes (Prout, 1958) (Sulawesi)
