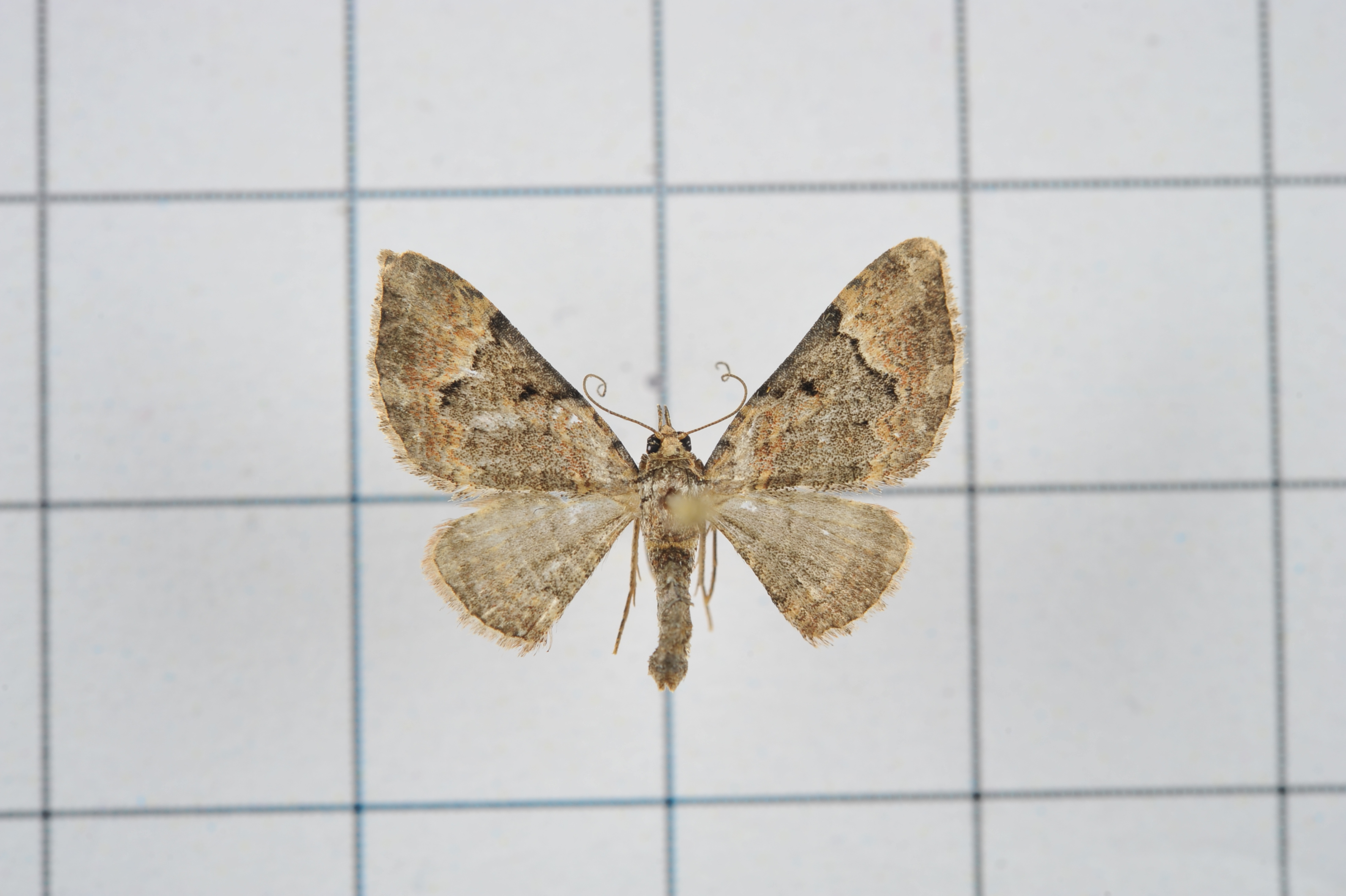

Scientific classification
- Kingdom: Animalia
- Phylum: Arthropoda
- Class: Insecta
- Order: Lepidoptera
- Family: Geometridae
- Genus: Mnesiloba
- Species: M. dentifascia

Binomial name
- Mnesiloba dentifascia (Hampson, 1891)

Synonyms
- Eupithecia dentifascia Hampson, 1891; Mnesiloba seminigra Bastelberger, 1905

= Mnesiloba dentifascia =

Species of moth

Mnesiloba dentifascia is a moth of the family Geometridae first described by George Hampson in 1891. It is known from the Oriental tropics.

== Description ==
Its wingspan is about 20 mm. Palpi with second joint reaching only just beyond the frontal tuft. Forewings usually with a tuft of raised scales on discocellulars. The body is dark brown, with black irrorations (speckles) and fuscous suffusion. Forewings with oblique, sub-basal, and antemedial lines angled below costa. The medial area blackish, with black cell-speck and edged by oblique black lines, where the outer highly dentate below veins 3 and 2. There is an indistinct waved postmedial line and waved grey sub-marginal line. Patches of fuscous suffusion found on margin below apex and above outer angle. Hindwings with indistinct dark antemedial, medial, postmedial and submarginal lines, becoming obsolescent on costal area, which is pale.
