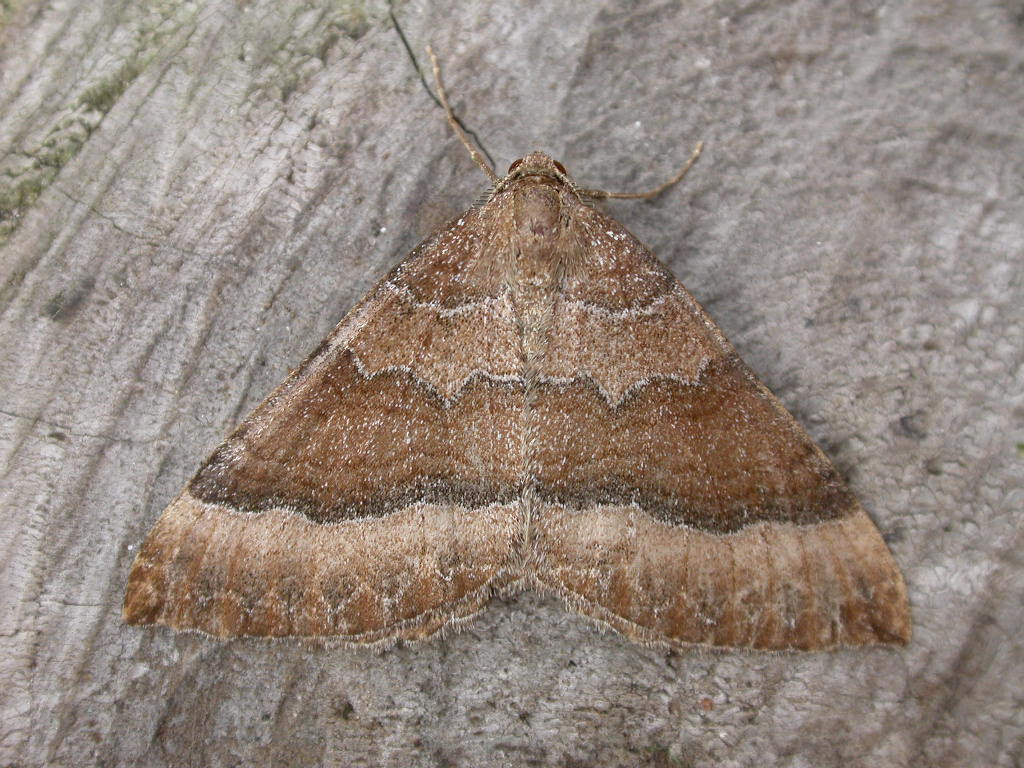
- Mallow (Larentia clavaria)

Scientific classification
- Kingdom: Animalia
- Phylum: Arthropoda
- Clade: Pancrustacea
- Class: Insecta
- Order: Lepidoptera
- Family: Geometridae
- Subfamily: Larentiinae
- Tribe: Larentiini; Duponchel, 1845

= Larentiini =

Tribe of moths

Larentiini is a tribe of geometer moths under subfamily Larentiinae. The tribe was first described by Philogène Auguste Joseph Duponchel in 1845.

== Recognized genera ==
- Anticlea Stephens, 1831
- Antilurga Herbulot, 1951
- Earophila Gumppenberg, 1887
- Ennada Blanchard, 1852
- Entephria Hübner, 1825
- Herbulotina Pinker, [1971]
- Idiotephria Inoue, 1943
- Kuldscha Alphéraky, 1883
- Kyrtolitha Staudinger, 1892
- Larentia Treitschke, 1825
- Mesoleuca Hübner, 1825
- Neotephria Prout, 1914
- Pelurga Hübner, 1825
- Photoscotosia Warren, 1888
- Plesioscotosia Viidalepp, 1986
- Pseudentephria Viidalepp, 1976
- Spargania Guenée, 1857
