= Anticlea (disambiguation) =

Anticlea (Ancient Greek: Ἀντίκλεια, literally "without fame") is a character in Greek mythology.

Anticlea is also the generic name of two groups of organisms:

- Anticlea (moth), a genus of moths in the family Geometridae
- Anticlea (plant), a genus of plants in the family Melianthiaceae
