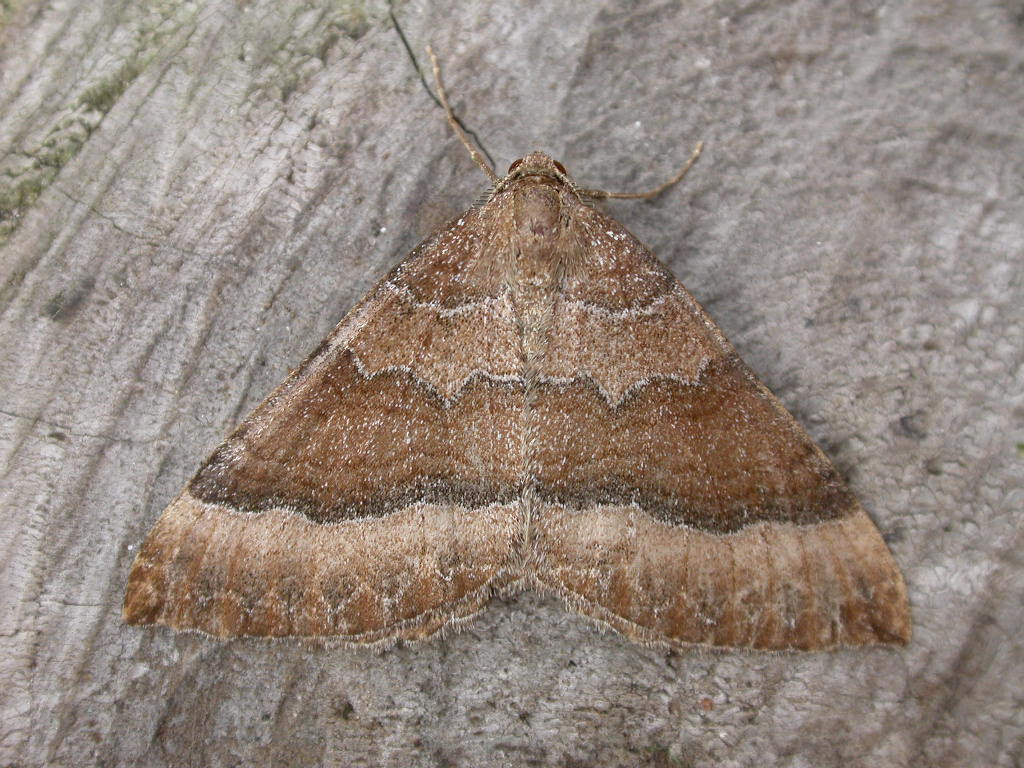

Scientific classification
- Domain: Eukaryota
- Kingdom: Animalia
- Phylum: Arthropoda
- Class: Insecta
- Order: Lepidoptera
- Family: Geometridae
- Tribe: Larentiini
- Genus: Larentia; Treitschke, 1825

Synonyms
- Helastia Guenée, 1868

= Larentia (moth) =

Genus of insects

Larentia is a genus of moths in the family Geometridae first described by Treitschke in 1825.

== Species ==
- Larentia clavaria (Haworth, 1809) – mallow
- Larentia malvata (Rambur, [1833])
