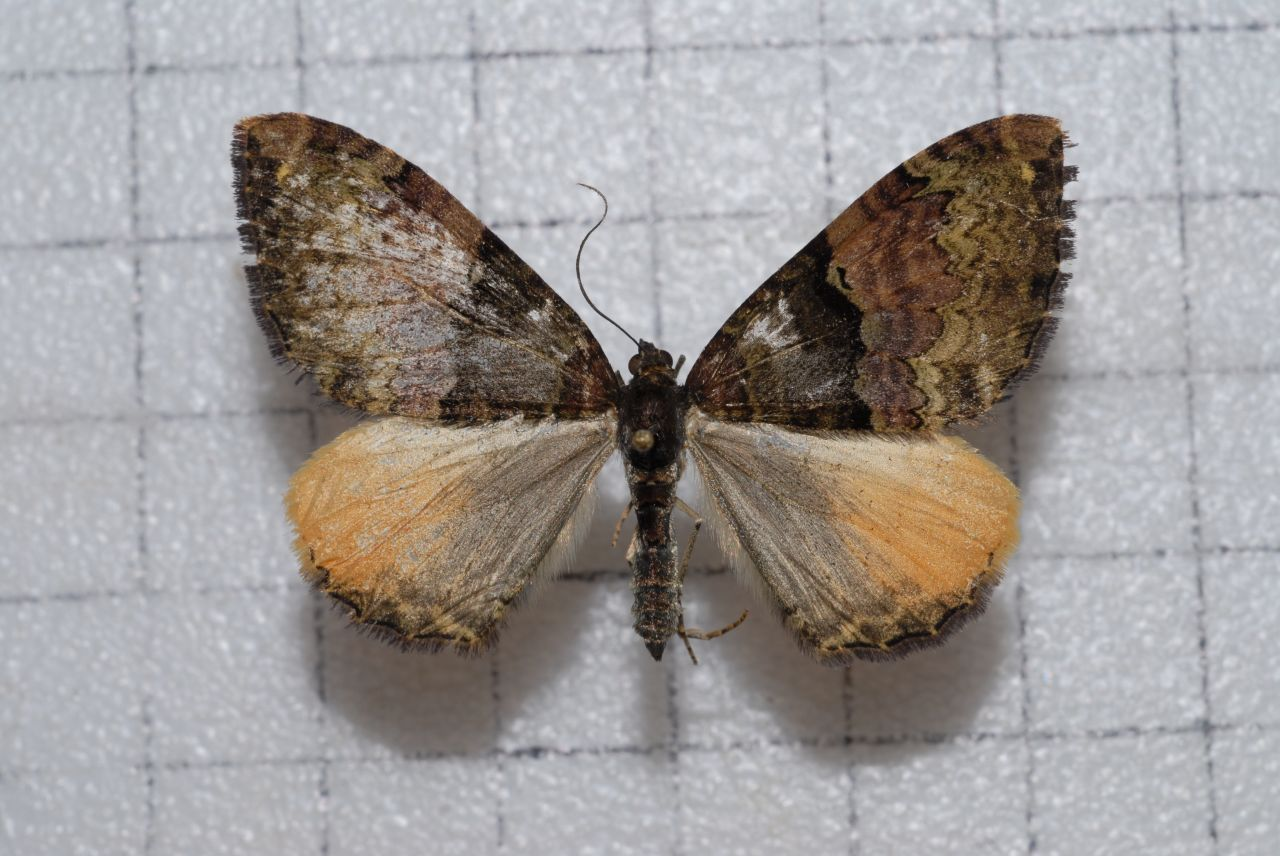
- Photoscotosia insularis

Scientific classification
- Kingdom: Animalia
- Phylum: Arthropoda
- Class: Insecta
- Order: Lepidoptera
- Family: Geometridae
- Tribe: Larentiini
- Genus: Photoscotosia; Warren, 1888

Type species
- Photoscotosia miniosata (Walker, 1862)

Synonyms
- Lasiogma Meyrick, 1892; Trichopleura Staudinger, 1882

= Photoscotosia =

Genus of moths

Photoscotosia is a genus of moths in the family Geometridae. It was erected by Warren in 1862.

== Selected species ==
Some species in this genus are:

- Photoscotosia albapex Hampson, 1895 (India)
- Photoscotosia amplicata (Walker, 1862) (India)
- Photoscotosia annubilata Prout, 1940 (India)
- Photoscotosia atromarginata Warren, 1893 (India)
- Photoscotosia atrostrigata (Bremer, 1864)
- Photoscotosia dejuncta Prout, 1937 (India)
- Photoscotosia fulguritis Warren, 1893 (India)
- Photoscotosia insularis Bastelberger, 1909
- Photoscotosia metachryseis Hampson, 1896 (India)
- Photoscotosia miniosata (Walker, 1862) (India)
- Photoscotosia multilinea Warren, 1893 (India)
- Photoscotosia nubilata Moore, 1888 (India)
- Photoscotosia obliquisignata Moore, 1867 (India)
- Photoscotosia pamirica (Viidalepp, 1988)
- Photoscotosia palaearctica (Staudinger, 1882) (northern China)
- Photoscotosia stigmatica Warren, 1894
- Photoscotosia undulosa (Alpheraky, 1888) (India)
