= Antilurga =

Scientific classification
- Kingdom: Animalia
- Phylum: Arthropoda
- Class: Insecta
- Order: Lepidoptera
- Family: Geometridae
- Tribe: Larentiini
- Genus: Antilurga; Herbulot, 1951

Genus of geometer moths

Antilurga is a genus of moths in the family Geometridae.

== Species ==
- Antilurga alhambrata (Staudinger, 1859)
- Antilurga altatlas
- Antilurga reductaria
