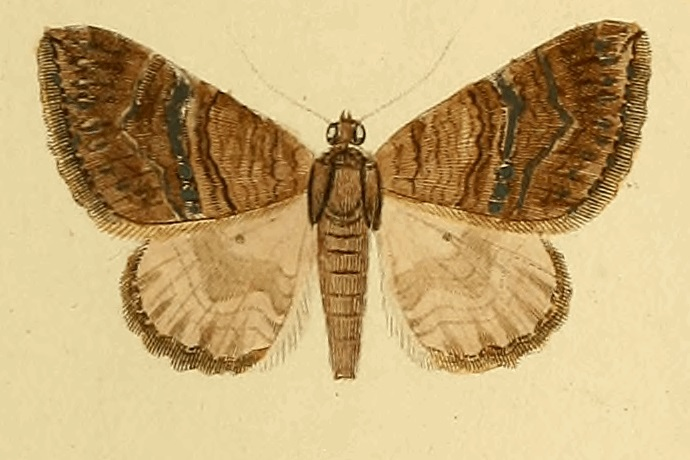

Scientific classification
- Domain: Eukaryota
- Kingdom: Animalia
- Phylum: Arthropoda
- Class: Insecta
- Order: Lepidoptera
- Family: Geometridae
- Genus: Larentia
- Species: L. malvata

Binomial name
- Larentia malvata (Rambur, [1833])

Synonyms
- Cidaria malvata Rambur, [1833]

= Larentia malvata =

Species of moth

Larentia malvata is a moth of the family Geometridae. It was described by Rambur in 1833. It is found in Portugal, Spain, France, Italy, Croatia, Greece, as well as on Sardinia, Corsica, Sicily, Malta and Crete.

The wingspan is 26–31 mm.

The larvae feed on Malva and Lavatera species.
