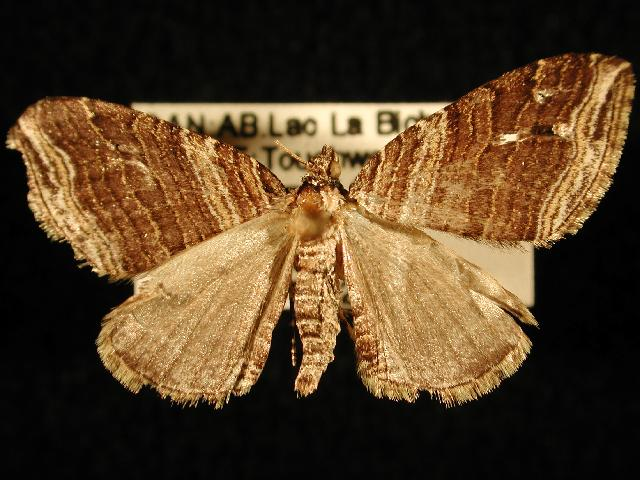

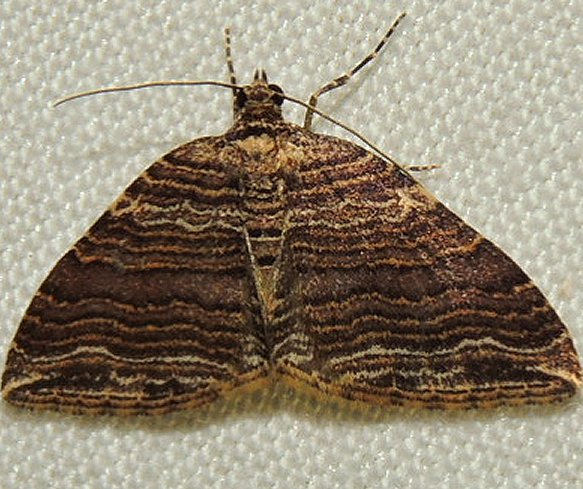

Scientific classification
- Kingdom: Animalia
- Phylum: Arthropoda
- Class: Insecta
- Order: Lepidoptera
- Family: Geometridae
- Genus: Anticlea
- Species: A. multiferata

Binomial name
- Anticlea multiferata (Walker, 1863)

Synonyms
- Camptogramma multiferata Walker, 1863

= Anticlea multiferata =

Species of moth

Anticlea multiferata, the many-lined carpet, is a moth of the family Geometridae. The species was first described by Francis Walker in 1863. It is known from all of North America, including Alaska and the Arctic regions of Canada.

The wingspan is 19–25 mm. Adults are on wing from April to August, although only in April and May in the south and from May to July in the north.

The larvae feed on Epilobium species and Polygonum aviculare.
