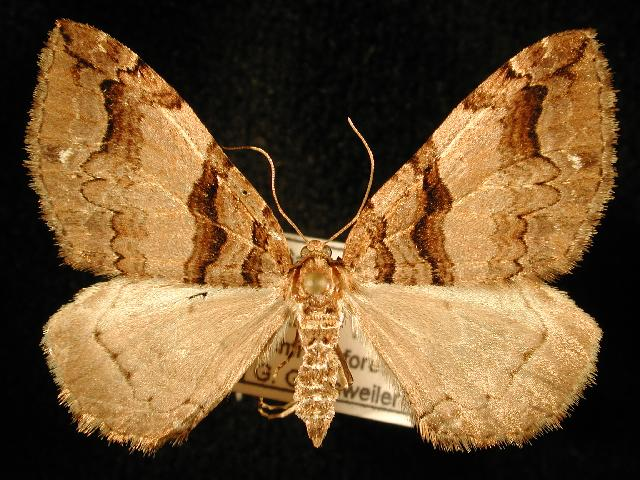

Scientific classification
- Kingdom: Animalia
- Phylum: Arthropoda
- Class: Insecta
- Order: Lepidoptera
- Family: Geometridae
- Genus: Anticlea
- Species: A. vasiliata

Binomial name
- Anticlea vasiliata Guenée, 1857

Synonyms
- Anticlea vasaliata; Anticlea spilosaria (Walker, 1860); Anticlea rigidata (Walker, 1863); Anticlea niveifasciata (Hulst, 1900) (form)

= Anticlea vasiliata =

Species of moth

Anticlea vasiliata, the variable carpet moth or early carpet, is a moth of the family Geometridae. The species was first described by Achille Guenée in 1857. It is known from the northern part of the United States and southern Canada, from Newfoundland and Labrador to Maryland, west to California, north to British Columbia.

The wingspan is about 30 mm. Adults are on wing from April to June.

The larvae feed on Rubus idaeus and Rosa carolina.
