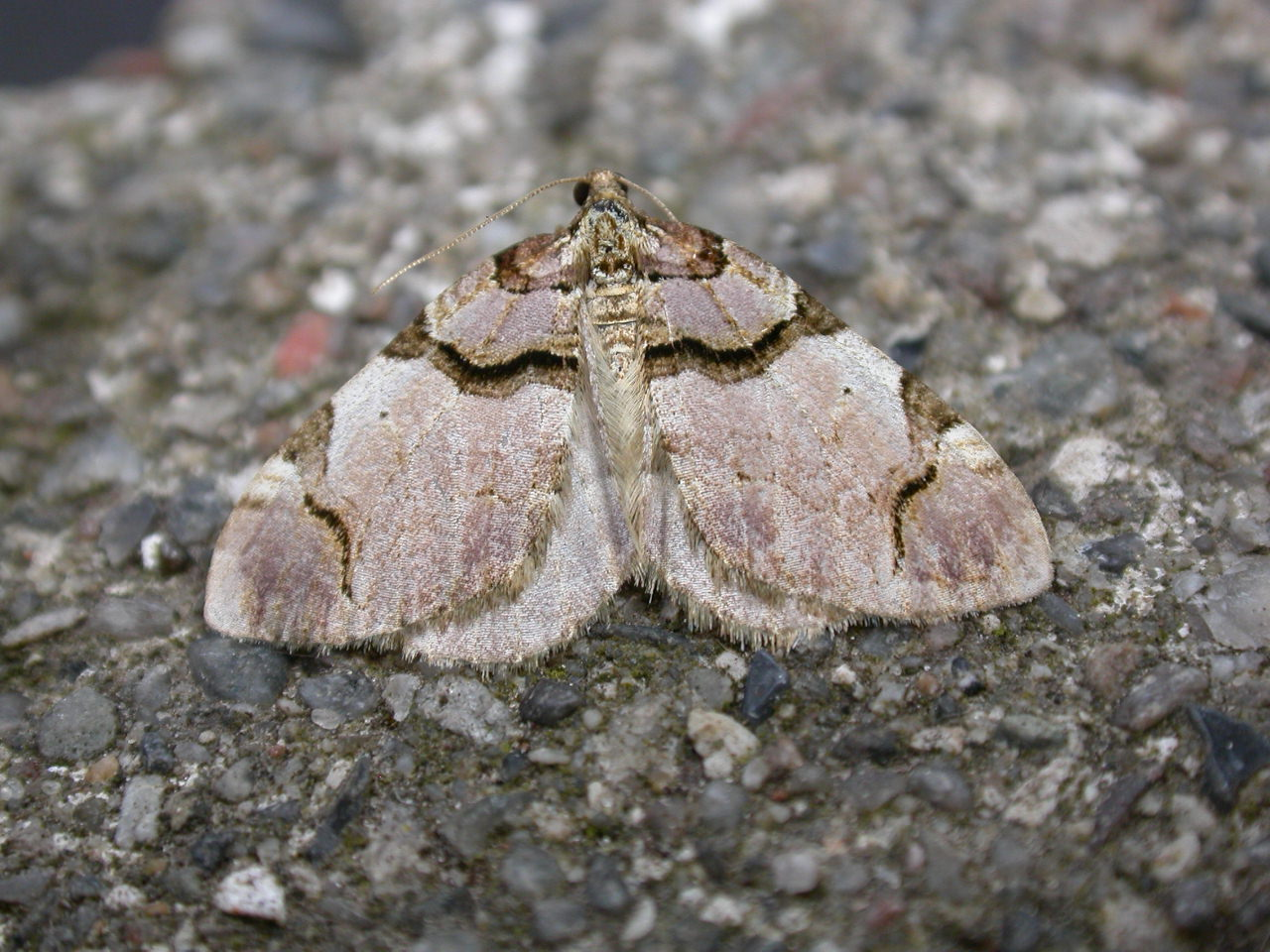

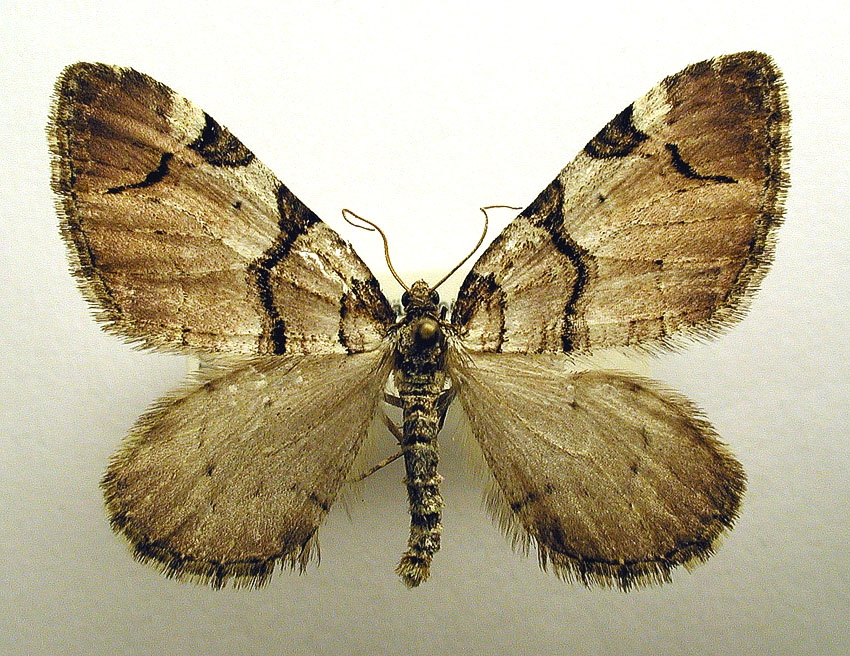

Scientific classification
- Domain: Eukaryota
- Kingdom: Animalia
- Phylum: Arthropoda
- Class: Insecta
- Order: Lepidoptera
- Family: Geometridae
- Genus: Anticlea
- Species: A. derivata

Binomial name
- Anticlea derivata (Denis & Schiffermüller, 1775)

= Anticlea derivata =

Species of moth

Anticlea derivata, the streamer, is a moth of the family Geometridae. The species was first described by Michael Denis and Ignaz Schiffermüller in 1775. It is found in Europe, North Africa and across the Palearctic up to the Altai Mountains.It prefers to live on sunny slopes, hedge rows, bushy places as well as in gardens and parks.

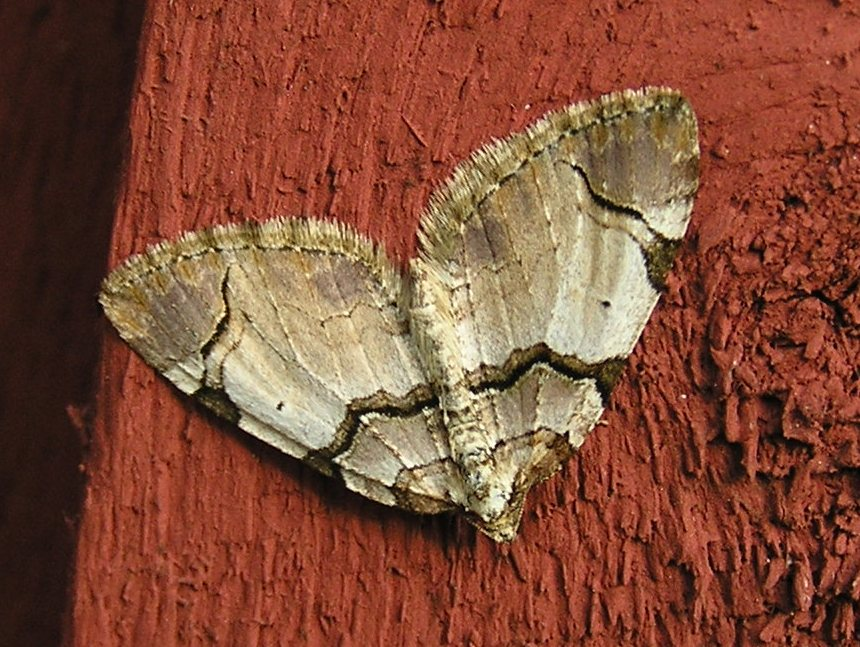

Its wingspan is 30–34 mm and its most common colours are light brown and light grey, tints of pink are also present. A narrow, dark lateral band is located near the base of the forewings. The basal region is limited by a slightly curved, blackish transverse band. A large dark triangle costal patch which becomes a jagged line gets thinner towards the inner edge and is a unique pattern. The hindwings are brown grey and show a faint cross line.

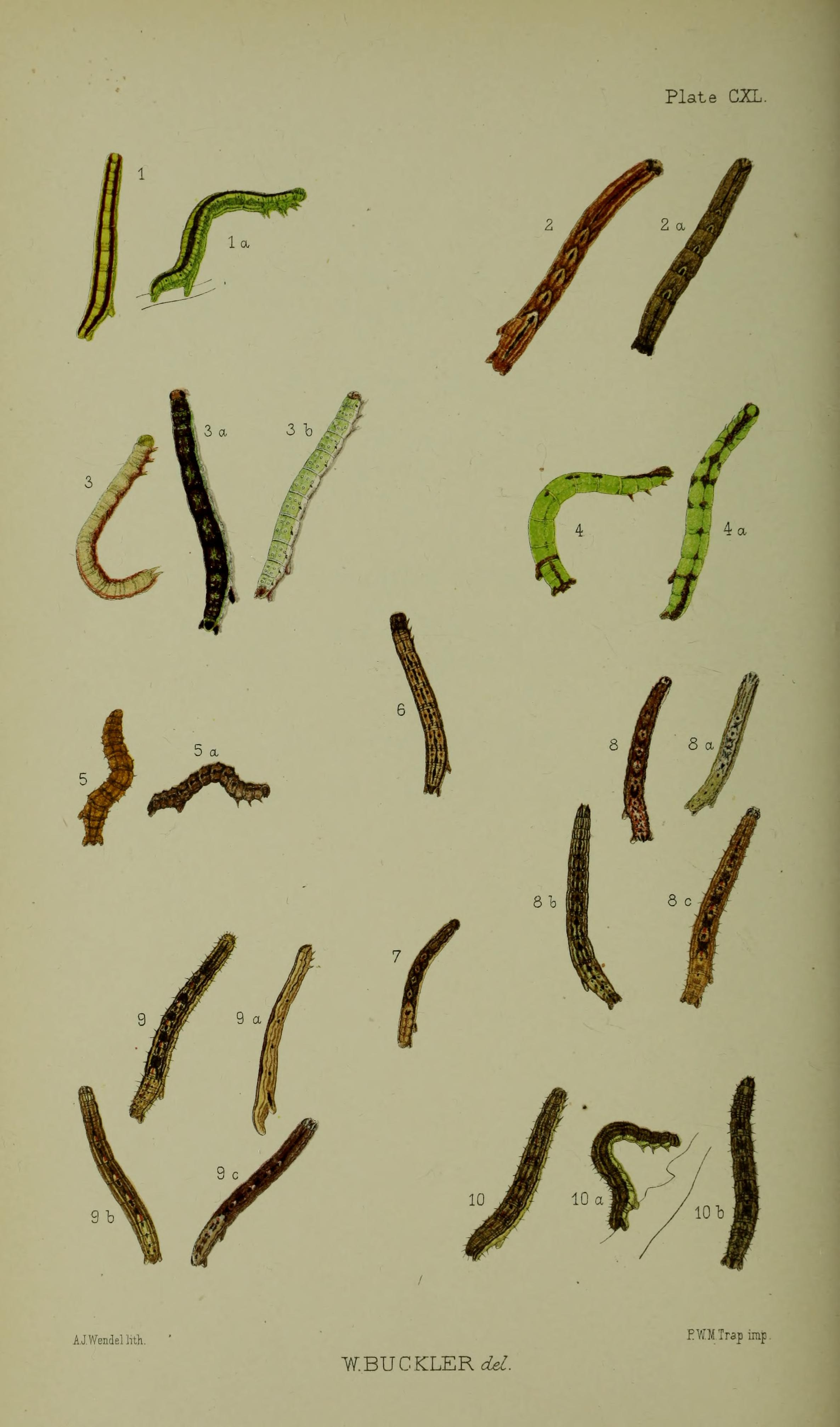
Figs 4, 4a larvae after final moult

The long caterpillar is green, inclining to yellowish between the segments; a purplish, or reddish-brown, stripe along the back is broken up into diamond-shaped spots on the middle segments. Sometimes the spots are reduced only to the areas behind the head and to the segment bearing the rearmost pair of legs.

The moth flies from March to May depending on the location.

The larvae feed on species of rose.
