= Kyrtolitha =

Scientific classification
- Kingdom: Animalia
- Phylum: Arthropoda
- Class: Insecta
- Order: Lepidoptera
- Family: Geometridae
- Tribe: Larentiini
- Genus: Kyrtolitha; Staudinger, 1892

Genus of moths

Kyrtolitha is a genus of moth in the family Geometridae.
