= Neotephria =

Scientific classification
- Kingdom: Animalia
- Phylum: Arthropoda
- Clade: Pancrustacea
- Class: Insecta
- Order: Lepidoptera
- Family: Geometridae
- Tribe: Larentiini
- Genus: Neotephria; Prout, 1914

Genus of moths

Neotephria is a genus of moths in the family Geometridae described by Prout in 1914.
