= Pseudentephria =

Scientific classification
- Kingdom: Animalia
- Phylum: Arthropoda
- Class: Insecta
- Order: Lepidoptera
- Family: Geometridae
- Tribe: Larentiini
- Genus: Pseudentephria; Viidalepp, 1976

Genus of moths

Pseudentephria is a genus of moths in the family Geometridae described by Viidalepp in 1976.
