= Kuldscha =

Scientific classification
- Kingdom: Animalia
- Phylum: Arthropoda
- Class: Insecta
- Order: Lepidoptera
- Family: Geometridae
- Tribe: Larentiini
- Genus: Kuldscha; Alphéraky, 1883

Genus of moths

Kuldscha is a genus of moths in the family Geometridae described by Sergei Alphéraky in 1883.
