= Plesioscotosia =

Scientific classification
- Kingdom: Animalia
- Phylum: Arthropoda
- Class: Insecta
- Order: Lepidoptera
- Family: Geometridae
- Tribe: Larentiini
- Genus: Plesioscotosia; Viidalepp, 1986

Genus of moths

Plesioscotosia is a genus of moths in the family Geometridae described by Viidalepp in 1986.
