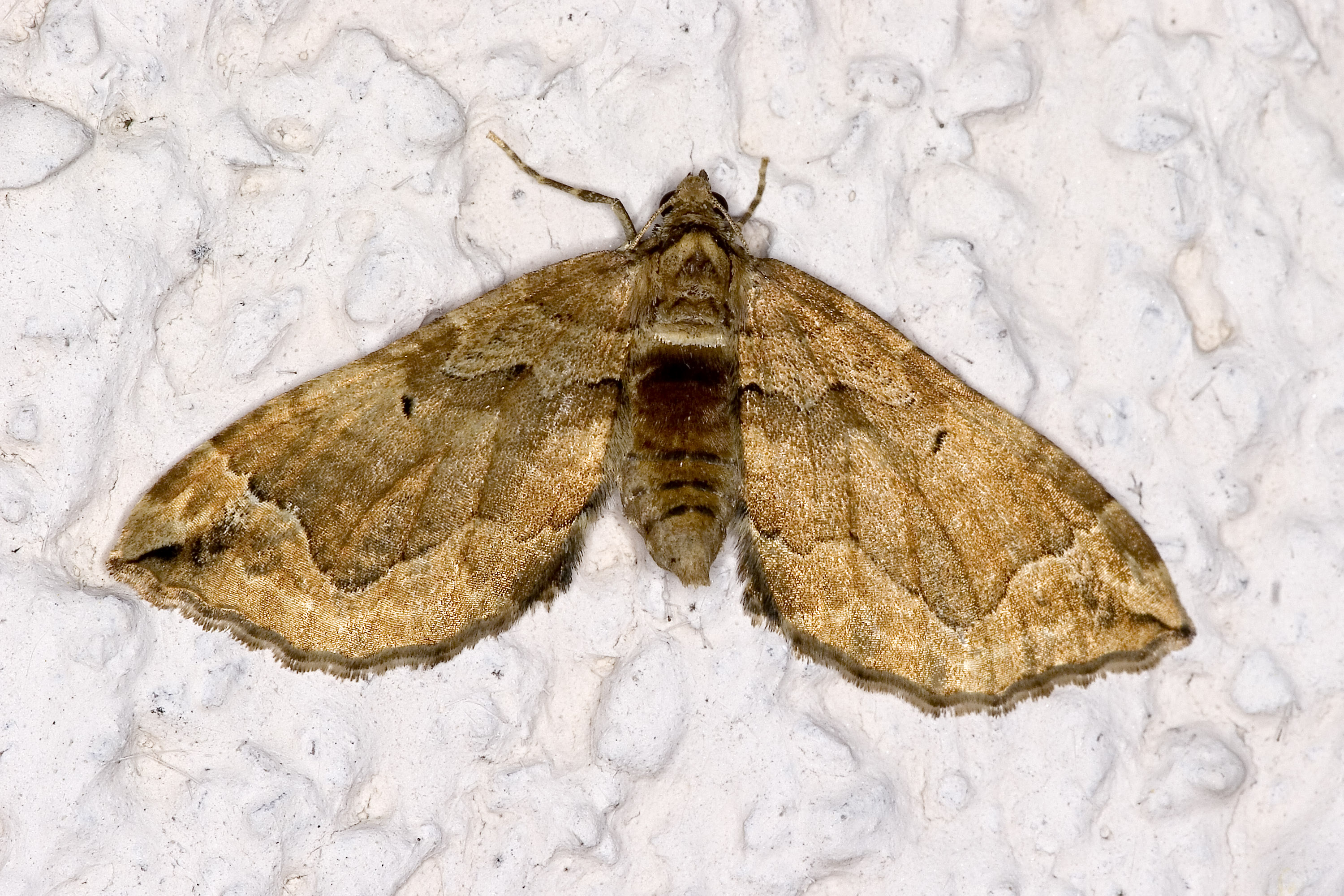

Scientific classification
- Kingdom: Animalia
- Phylum: Arthropoda
- Clade: Pancrustacea
- Class: Insecta
- Order: Lepidoptera
- Family: Geometridae
- Genus: Pelurga
- Species: P. comitata

Binomial name
- Pelurga comitata (Linnaeus, 1758)

= Pelurga comitata =

Species of moth

Pelurga comitata, the dark spinach, is a moth of the family Geometridae. It is found throughout the Palearctic, including Europe (except the South-west and the Arctic Region), Siberia, the Russian Far East and northern China

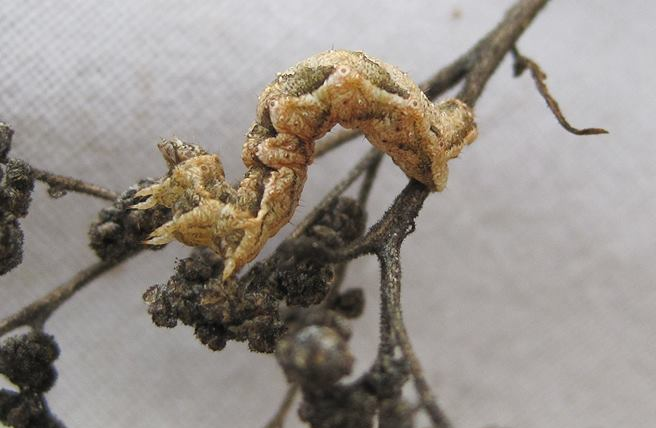
Larva

The wingspan is 25–30 mm. The length of the forewings is 16–18 mm. The forewings have a yellow-brown ground colour. The basal field is darker brownish. The midfield is wide, intersected by several lines and has a dark band on the inside. The basic colour of the forewings varies only slightly, in the tints of pale and dark browns. The outside of the midfield is bordered by a dark cross line with a pronounced bend distad. The wing apex is divided by a dark bar. The paler marginal field is marked with a faint wavy line that is shaded on the inside by brownish stains. The hind wings are yellowish grey and have indistinct crossbars. In ab. ferruginascens Krulik. [the ground colour] becomes bright rust-reddish. - In ab. moldavinata Carad. It is much darker and more unicolorous, the hindwing is also darkened. This latter form, which is recorded from N. Germany, Romnania, the Ural, Ussuri, etc., is perhaps in some localities tending to form a local race. — ab. zonata Wahhgren has the median band entirely brown-black, ground colour normal.

The larva is stout, rugose laterally, segmentation distinct; ochreous brown; dorsum tinged with green and with a row of large V-shaped dark markings on the abdominal segments, pointing forward.

The moth flies from mid June to mid September.

The larva feeds on orache and goosefoot especially on the flowers and seeds.

== Notes ==
1. The flight season refers to Belgium and The Netherlands. This may vary in other parts of the range.
