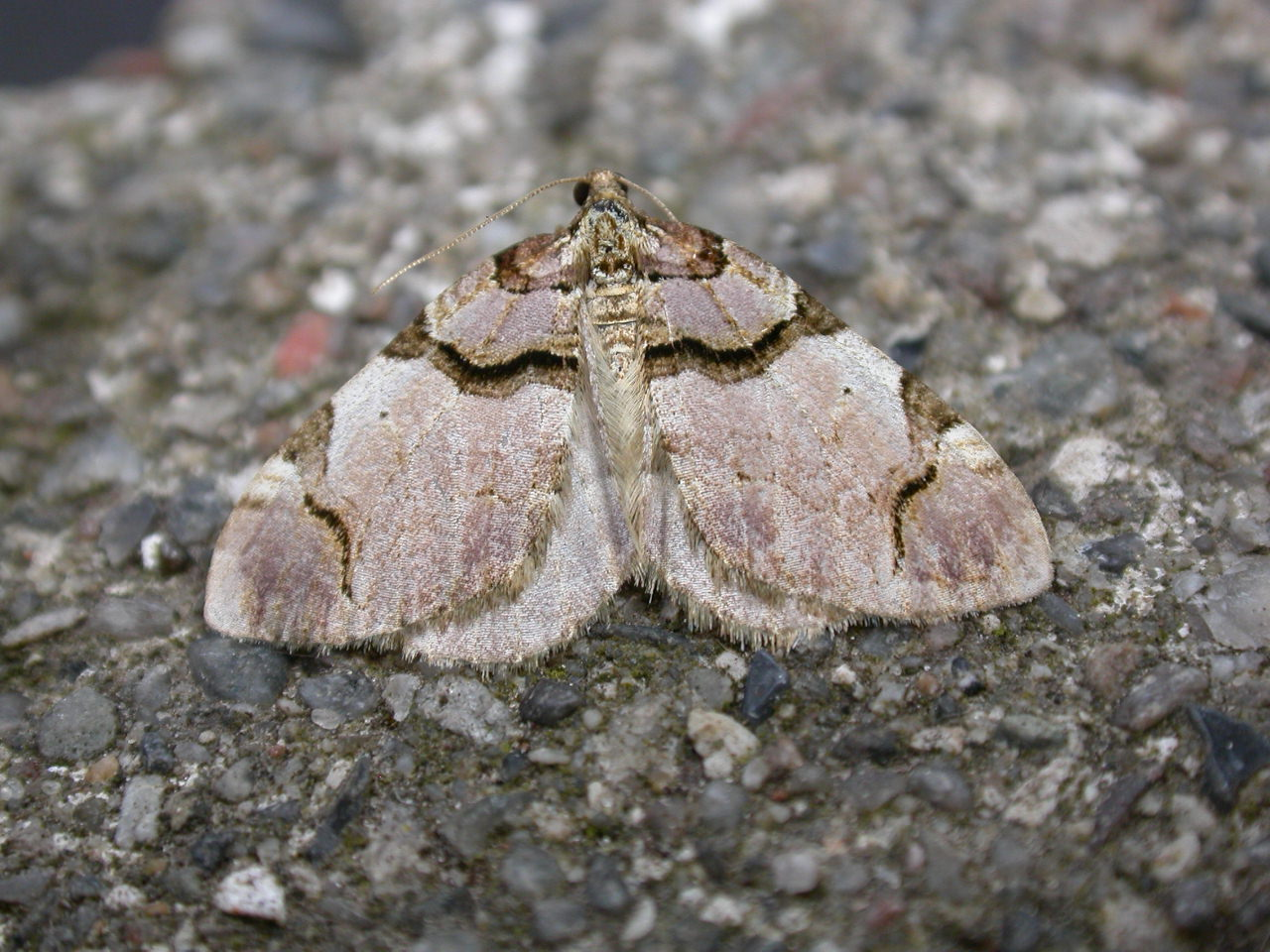
- Anticlea derivata

Scientific classification
- Kingdom: Animalia
- Phylum: Arthropoda
- Class: Insecta
- Order: Lepidoptera
- Family: Geometridae
- Tribe: Larentiini
- Genus: Anticlea; Stephens, 1831

= Anticlea (moth) =

Genus of geometer moths

Anticlea is a genus of moths in the family Geometridae first described by James Francis Stephens in 1831.

== Species ==
- Anticlea badiata (Denis & Schiffermüller, 1775) – shoulder stripe
- Anticlea cabrerai
- Anticlea correlata Warren, 1901
- Anticlea derivata (Denis & Schiffermüller, 1775) – streamer
- Anticlea multiferata (Walker, 1863) – many-lined carpet
- Anticlea pectinata (Rindge, 1967)
- Anticlea switzeraria (W. S. Wright, 1916)
- Anticlea vasiliata Guenée, 1857 – variable carpet
