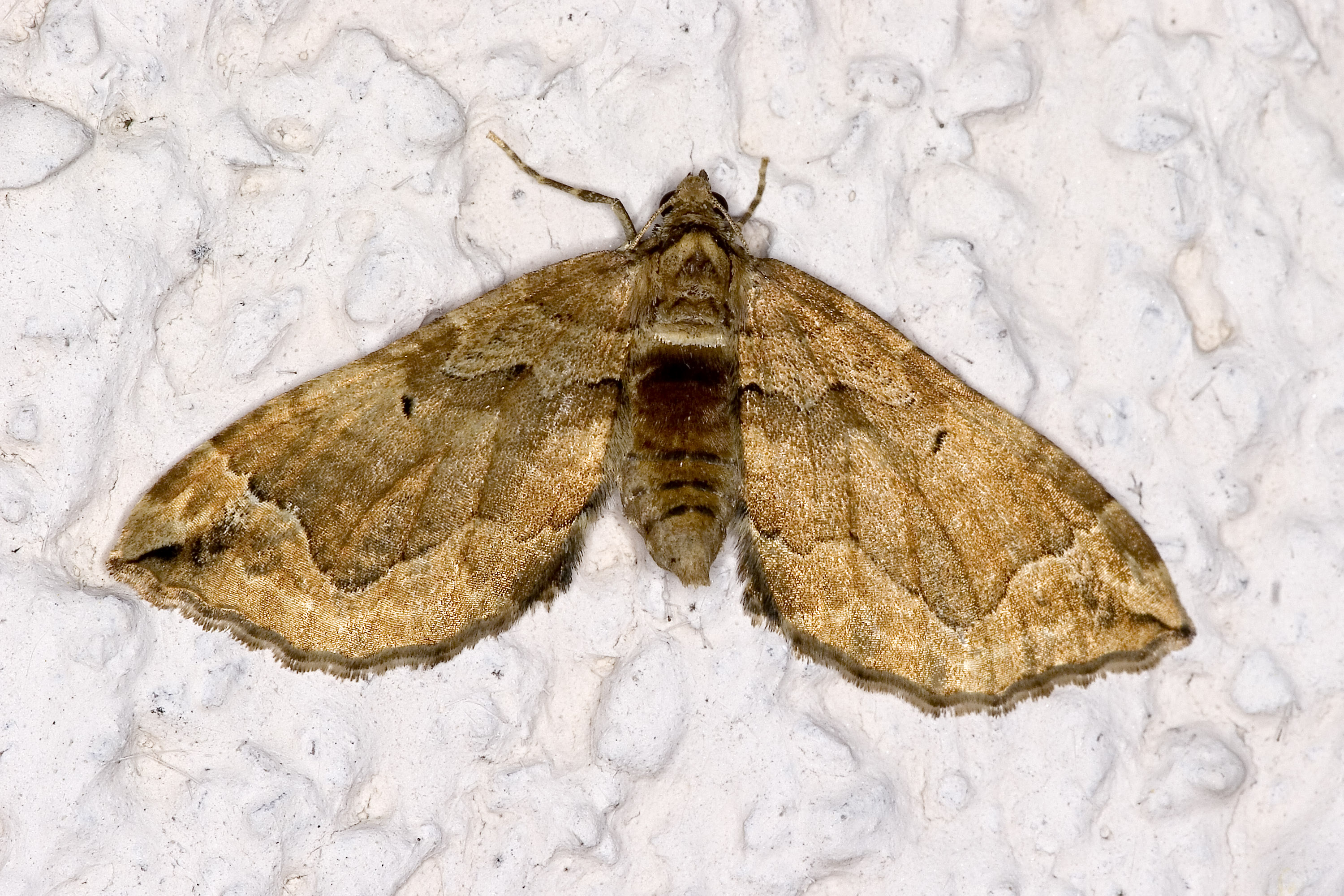

Scientific classification
- Kingdom: Animalia
- Phylum: Arthropoda
- Clade: Pancrustacea
- Class: Insecta
- Order: Lepidoptera
- Family: Geometridae
- Tribe: Larentiini
- Genus: Pelurga; Hübner, 1825

= Pelurga =

Genus of moths

Pelurga is a genus of moths in the family Geometridae erected by Jacob Hübner in 1825.

== Species ==
- Pelurga comitata (Linnaeus, 1758) – dark spinach
- Pelurga onoi (Inoue, 1965)
- Pelurga taczanowskiaria (Oberthür, 1880)
