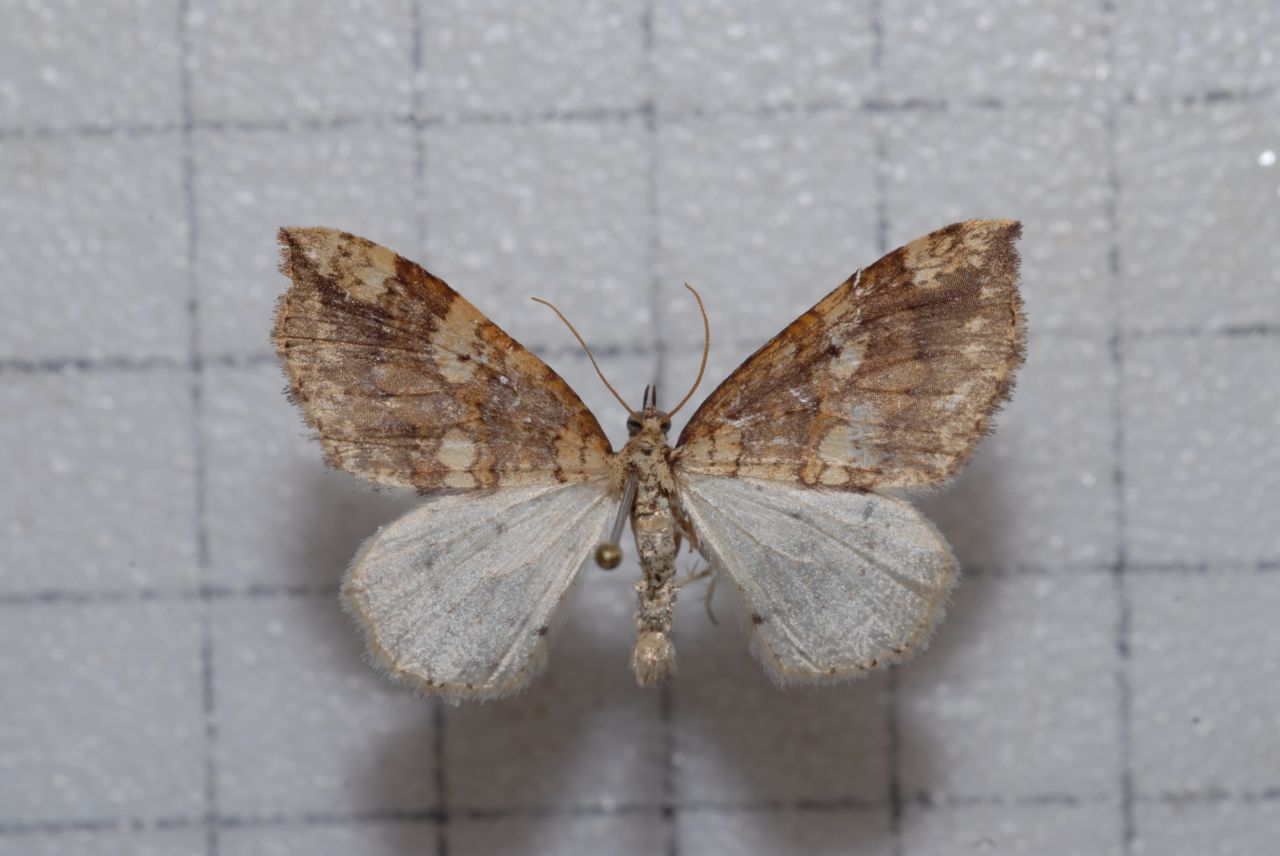

Scientific classification
- Kingdom: Animalia
- Phylum: Arthropoda
- Class: Insecta
- Order: Lepidoptera
- Family: Geometridae
- Genus: Idiotephria
- Species: I. nakatomii

Binomial name
- Idiotephria nakatomii Inoue, 1978

= Idiotephria nakatomii =

Species of moth

Idiotephria nakatomii is a species of moth of the family Geometridae. It is found in Taiwan.
