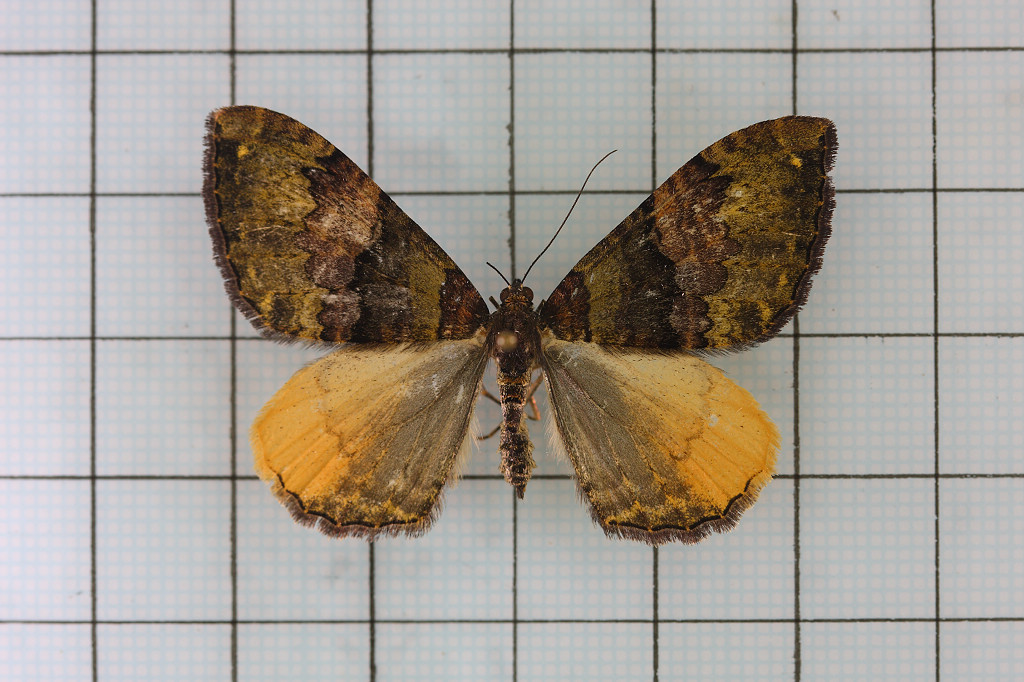

Scientific classification
- Kingdom: Animalia
- Phylum: Arthropoda
- Class: Insecta
- Order: Lepidoptera
- Family: Geometridae
- Genus: Photoscotosia
- Species: P. insularis

Binomial name
- Photoscotosia insularis Bastelberger, 1909

= Photoscotosia insularis =

Species of moth

Photoscotosia insularis is a species of moth of the family Geometridae first described by Max Bastelberger in 1909. It is found in Taiwan.

The wingspan is 40–50 mm.
