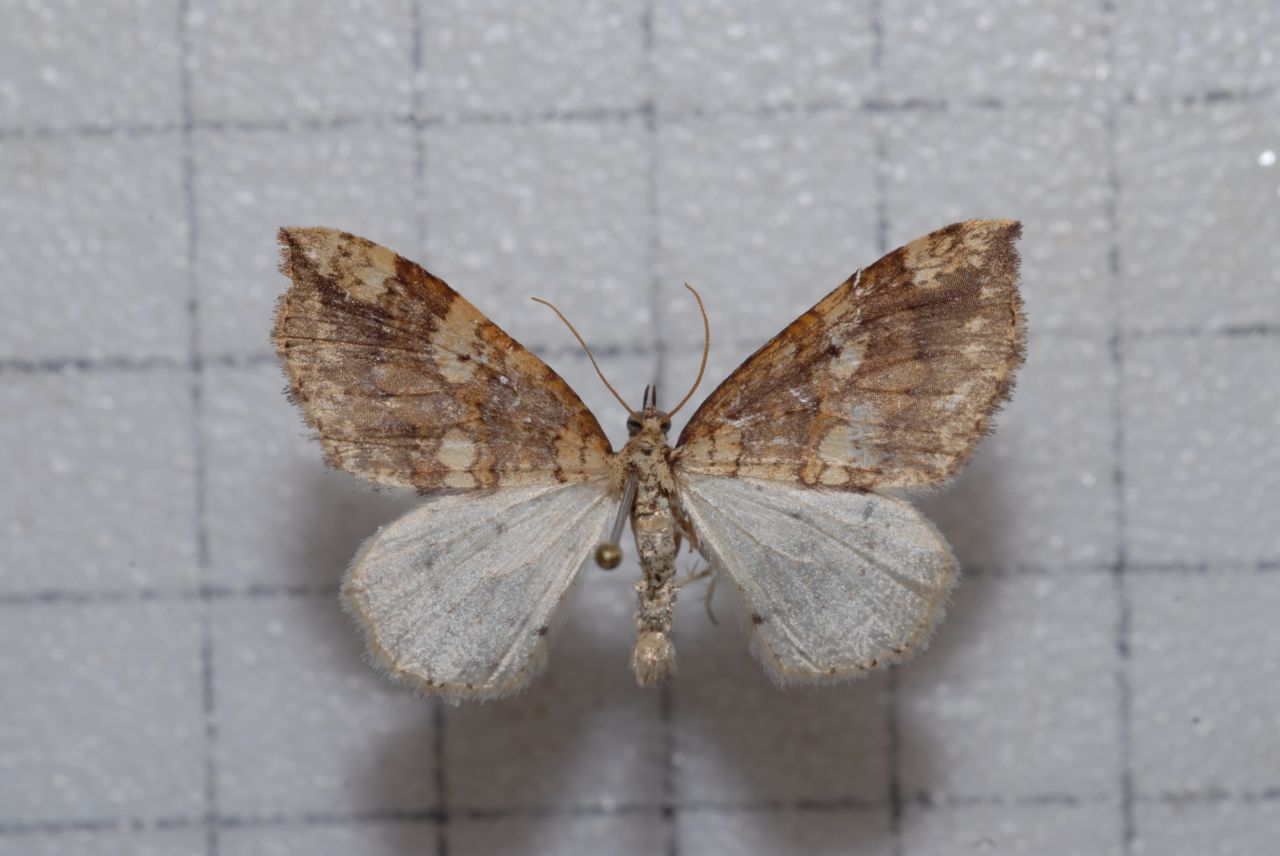

Scientific classification
- Kingdom: Animalia
- Phylum: Arthropoda
- Class: Insecta
- Order: Lepidoptera
- Family: Geometridae
- Tribe: Larentiini
- Genus: Idiotephria; Inoue, 1943

= Idiotephria =

Genus of moths

Idiotephria is a genus of moths in the family Geometridae described by Hiroshi Inoue in 1943.

== Species ==
- Idiotephria amelia (Butler, 1878)
- Idiotephria debilitata (Leech, 1891)
- Idiotephria evanescens (Staudinger, 1897)
- Idiotephria nakatomii Inoue, 1978
- Idiotephria occidentalis Yazaki, 1993
