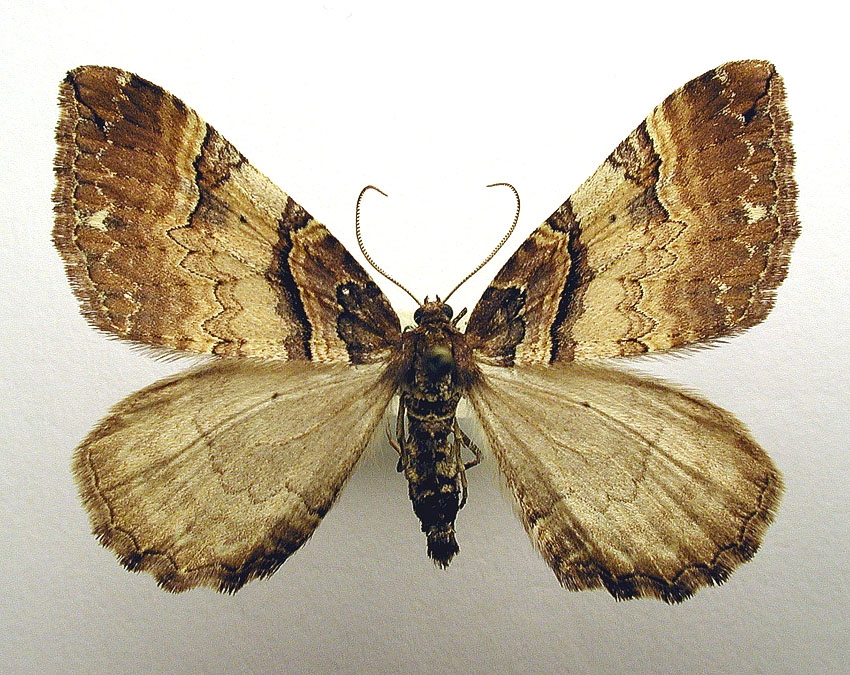

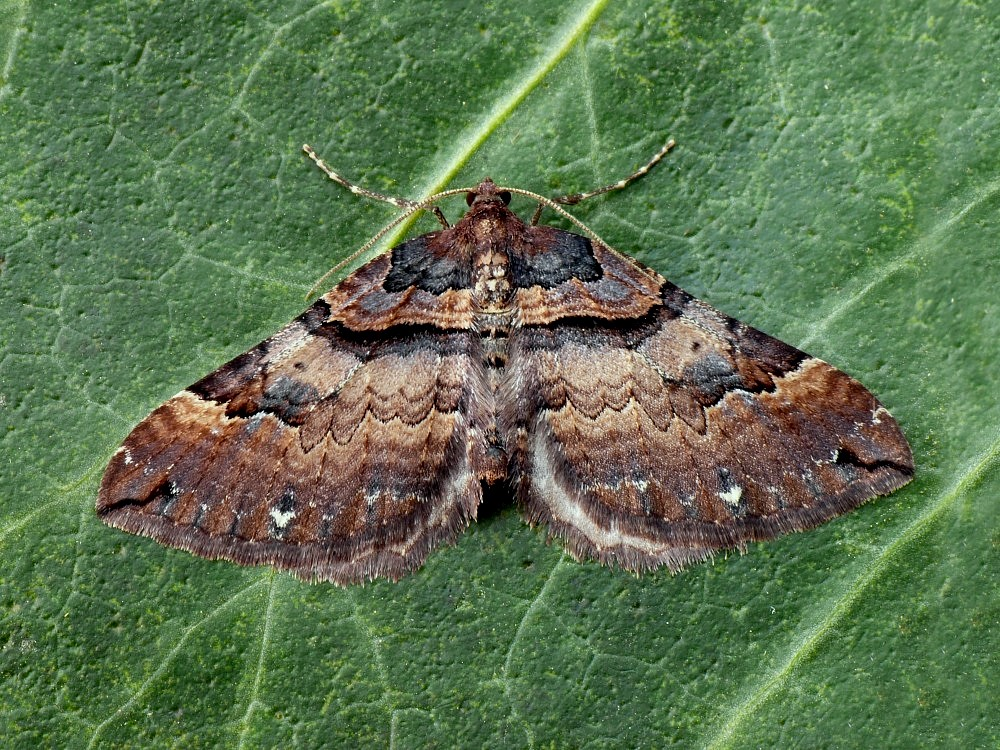

Scientific classification
- Domain: Eukaryota
- Kingdom: Animalia
- Phylum: Arthropoda
- Class: Insecta
- Order: Lepidoptera
- Family: Geometridae
- Genus: Earophila
- Species: E. badiata

Binomial name
- Earophila badiata (Denis & Schiffermüller, 1775)

Synonyms
- Geometra badiata Denis & Schiffermuller, 1775; Cidaria fennokarelica Kaisila, 1945; Anticlea badiata

= Earophila badiata =

Species of moth

Earophila badiata, the shoulder stripe, is a moth of the family Geometridae. The species was first described by Michael Denis and Ignaz Schiffermüller in 1775. It is found from most of Europe and North Africa to the Altai Mountains in the east Palearctic.

The wingspan is 25–30 mm. Adults are variable in colour and size.ab. pallida Lambill. is paler, the basal area little darkened, distal not darkened, the median band whitish, without a blue-grey spot distally to the cell.; ab. rectifasciaria Lambill. has the pale median area one-third broader than usual and not traversed by lines, the lines which bound it sharply marked. — ab. alpestris Neuburger, from the Tyrol, (at 3400 m) has the median area brown, the distal moderately darkened with no pale part and the hindwing also somewhat browner; in ab. subbadiata Strand the median band is pale, narrow, interrupted in the middle, the posterior part sometimes broken up into spots. The Larva is elongate, cylindrical; head rounded, distinct, orange with a large black spot on side; body very variable in colour dorsally, green, purple or slaty grey, a dark spot on side of prothoracic leg, another dorsally on the 10th abdominal segment, dorsal tubercles white, lateral tubercles black. The rather stout pupa is dark glossy red-brown, the anal segment black, the cremaster short and thick.

Adults are on wing from mid March to May in two generations.

The larvae feed on Rosa species. Larvae can be found from March to July. It overwinters as a pupa in loose soil.

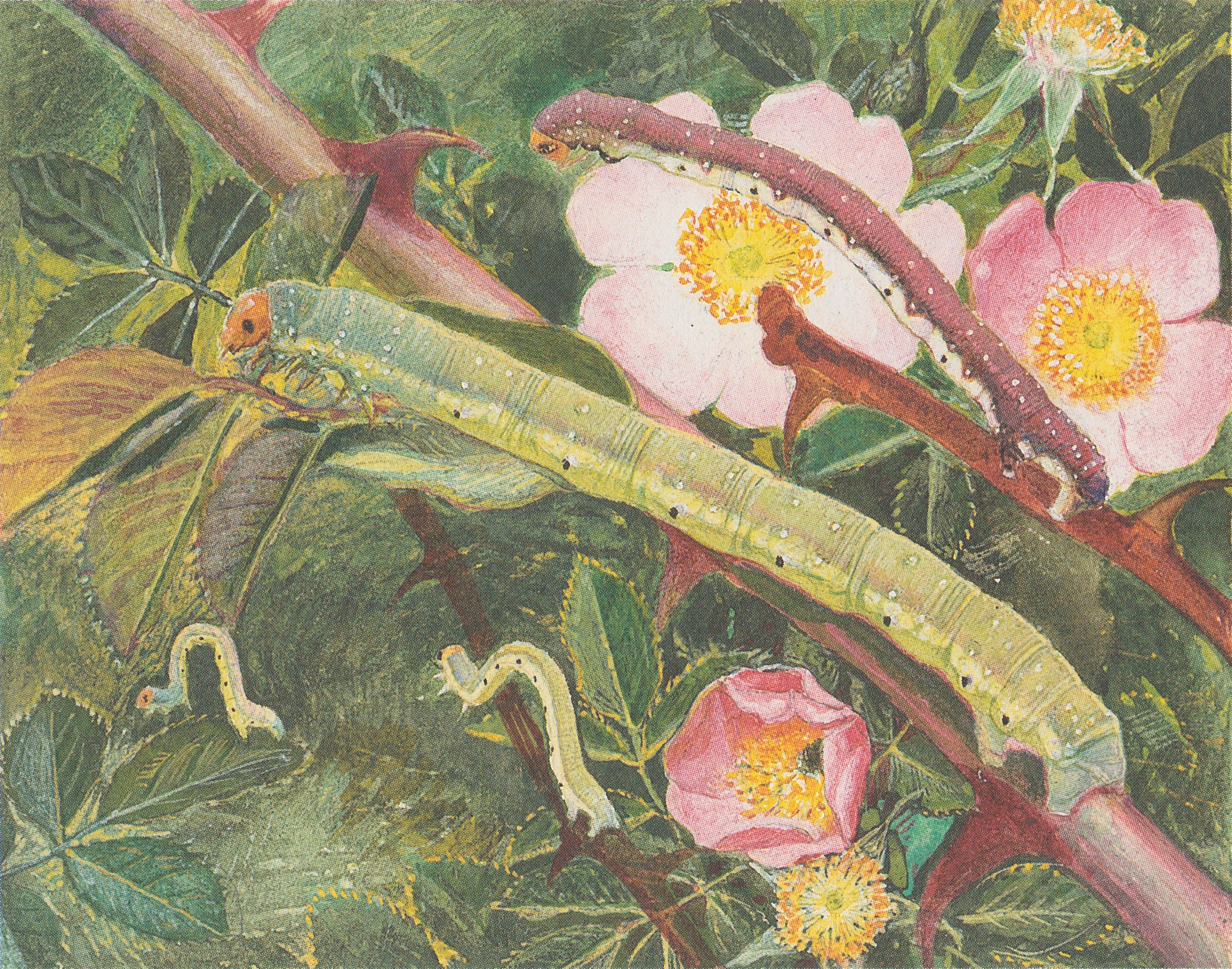
Drawing of the caterpillars on Rosa canina

== Subspecies ==
- Earophila badiata badiata (Denis & Schiffermüller, 1775)
- Earophila badiata fennokarelica (Kaisila, 1945)
