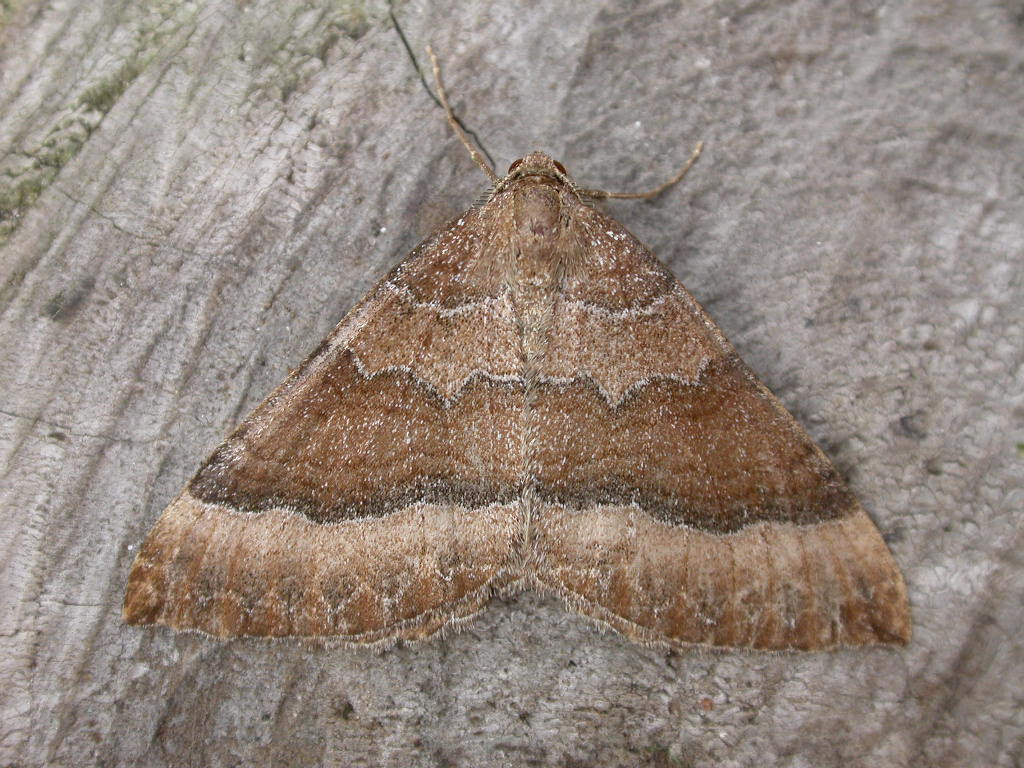

Scientific classification
- Domain: Eukaryota
- Kingdom: Animalia
- Phylum: Arthropoda
- Class: Insecta
- Order: Lepidoptera
- Family: Geometridae
- Genus: Larentia
- Species: L. clavaria

Binomial name
- Larentia clavaria (Haworth, 1809)

Synonyms
- Geometra clavaria Haworth, 1809; Geometra cervinata Denis & Schiffermuller, 1775; Ortholitha fumosata Turati, 1911; Eubolia datinaria Oberthur, 1890; Ortholitha pallidata Staudinger, 1901

= Larentia clavaria =

Species of moth

Larentia clavaria, the mallow, is a moth of the family Geometridae. The species was first described by Adrian Hardy Haworth in 1809. It is found from Siberia (Altai Mountains) in the east to the Iberian Peninsula, North Africa, and the British Isles in the west. In the north it ranges to the Caucasus, Tajikistan and Fennoscandia. In the south it is found the western Mediterranean islands, Italy, the Balkans and Asia Minor. It occurs only locally and is almost always rare. In the Alps, it rises up to 1200 m above sea level.

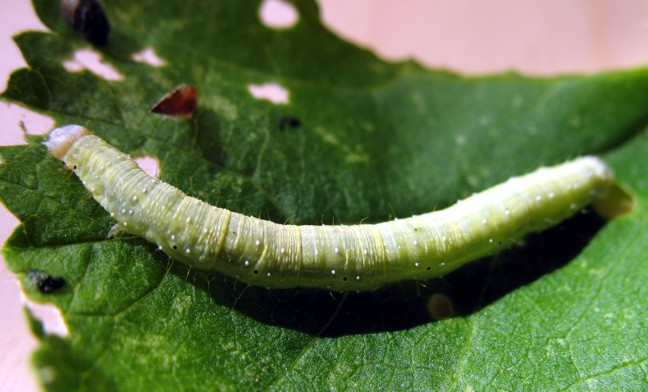
Caterpillar

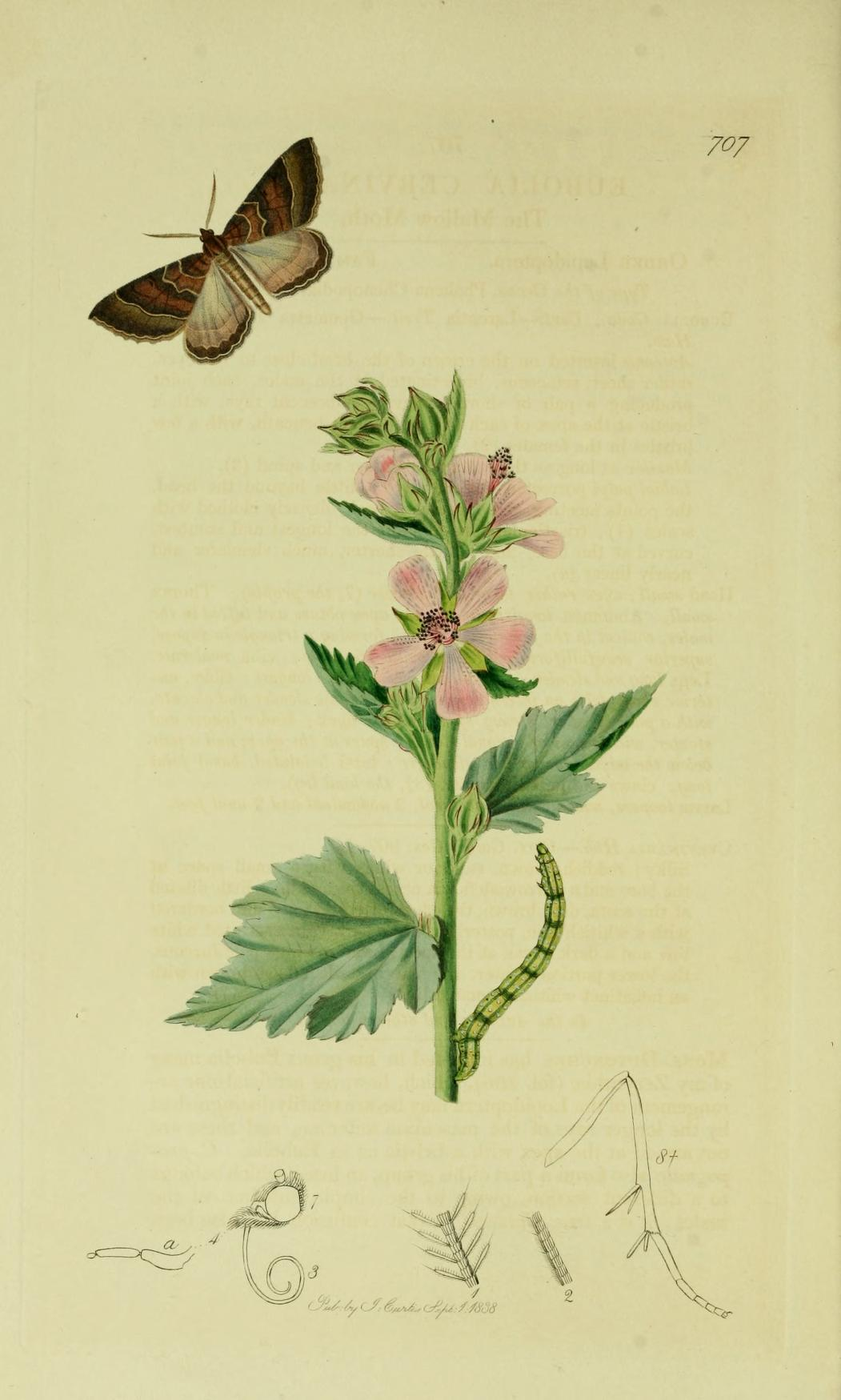
Illustration from John Curtis's British Entomology Volume 6

The wingspan is 36–40 mm. Forewings are fawn colour with a browner basal patch, median band and distal shade, all finely and delicately white-edged distally, the median band also accompanied by a fine white line proximally, sharply indented on the submedian fold and more shallowly in the cell. Hindwing pale, becoming browner at the distal margin. The larva is long and slender, monochrome bright yellow-green.

The moth flies from August to November depending on the location.

The larvae feed on Althaea officinalis and Malva species.

== Subspecies ==
- Larentia clavaria clavaria
- Larentia clavaria datinaria (Oberthur, 1890)
- Larentia clavaria pallidata (Staudinger, 1901)
- Larentia clavaria saisanica Prout, 1937
