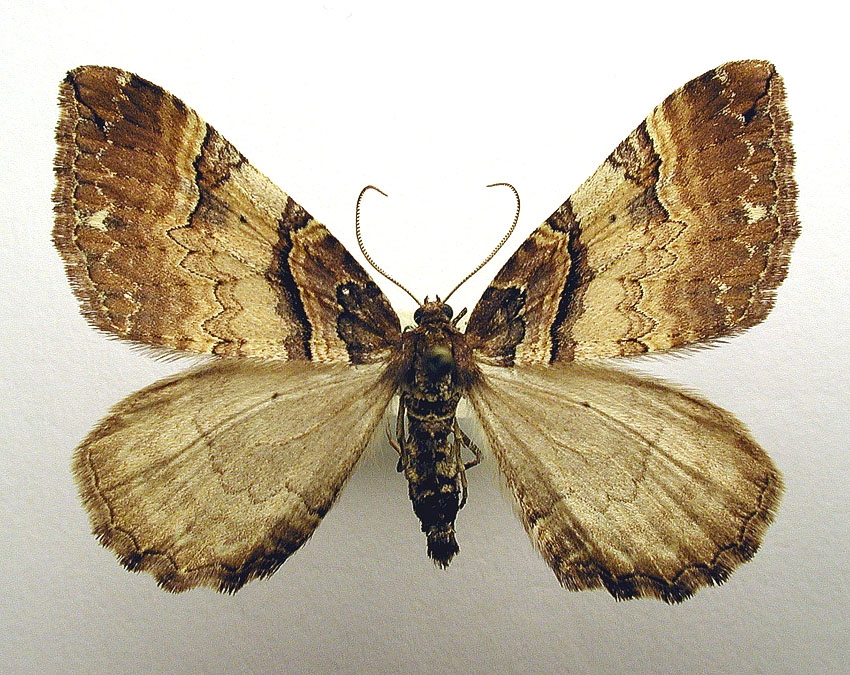
- Earophila badiata

Scientific classification
- Kingdom: Animalia
- Phylum: Arthropoda
- Class: Insecta
- Order: Lepidoptera
- Family: Geometridae
- Subfamily: Larentiinae
- Genus: Earophila; Gumppenberg, 1887

= Earophila =

Genus of moths

Earophila is a genus of moths in the family Geometridae described by Carl Freiherr von Gumppenberg in 1887.

== Species ==
- Earophila alpestris Neuberger, 1904
- Earophila approximata Lempke, 1950
- Earophila atrox Schwingenschuss, 1924/25
- Earophila badiata
  - Earophila badiata badiata (Denis & Schiffermüller, 1775)
  - Earophila badiata fennokarelica (Kaisila, 1945)
- Earophila badiiplaga D. S. Fletcher, 1953
- Earophila chillanensis Butler, 1882
- Earophila costiconfluens Silbernagel, 1940
- Earophila crepusculata D. S. Fletcher, 1953
- Earophila defasciata Lempke, 1950
- Earophila eckfordii Smith, 1947
- Earophila impuncta Lempke, 1950
- Earophila niveifascia Hulst, 1902
- Earophila niveifasciata Hulst, 1900
- Earophila obscurata Lempke, 1950
- Earophila ocellaria Bodart, 1910
- Earophila oculisigna L. B. Prout, 1923
- Earophila pallida Lamb, 1909
- Earophila planicolor Lempke, 1950
- Earophila radiata Speyer & Speyer, 1843
- Earophila rectifasciaria Lamb, 1909
- Earophila rigidata Walker, 1863
- Earophila semna Prout, 1929
- Earophila senna Bang-Haas, 1930
- Earophila spilosaria Walker, 1863
- Earophila subbadiata Strand, 1903
- Earophila swettaria Wright, 1916
- Earophila switzeraria Wright, 1916
- Earophila vasiliata Guenée, 1858
