= Nyctosia poicilonotus =

Scientific classification
- Domain: Eukaryota
- Kingdom: Animalia
- Phylum: Arthropoda
- Class: Insecta
- Order: Lepidoptera
- Superfamily: Noctuoidea
- Family: Erebidae
- Subfamily: Arctiinae
- Genus: Nyctosia
- Species: N. poicilonotus

Binomial name
- Nyctosia poicilonotus Dyar, 1912

Species of moth

Nyctosia poicilonotus is a moth of the subfamily Arctiinae. It was described by Harrison Gray Dyar Jr. in 1912. It is found in Mexico.
