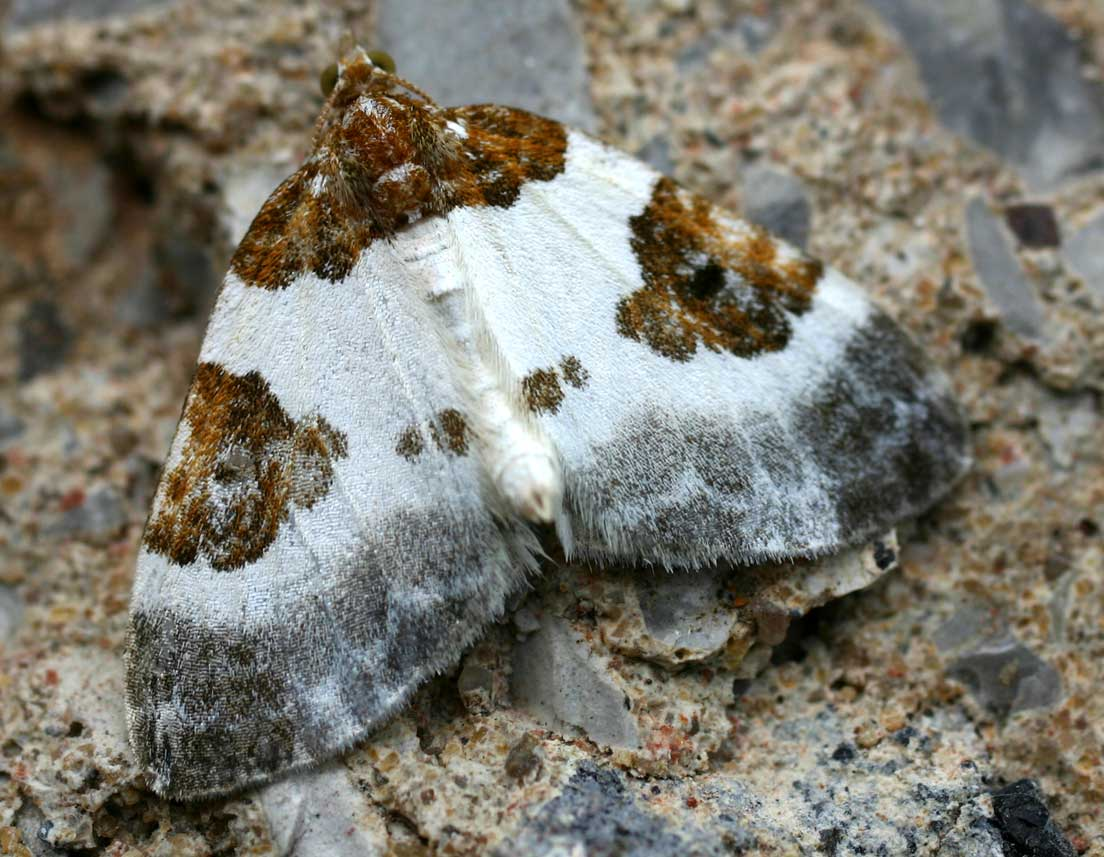

Scientific classification
- Kingdom: Animalia
- Phylum: Arthropoda
- Class: Insecta
- Order: Lepidoptera
- Family: Geometridae
- Genus: Plemyria
- Species: P. rubiginata

Binomial name
- Plemyria rubiginata (Denis & Schiffermüller, 1775)

Synonyms
- Geometra rubiginata Denis & Schiffermuller, 1775; Phalaena bicolorata Hufnagel, 1767 (preocc.); Zerene plumbata Curtis, 1837

= Plemyria rubiginata =

Blue-bordered carpet

Species of moth

Plemyria rubiginata, the blue-bordered carpet, is a moth of the family Geometridae found in Europe and across the Palearctic. The moth was first described by the Austrian lepidopterists Michael Denis and Ignaz Schiffermüller in 1775.

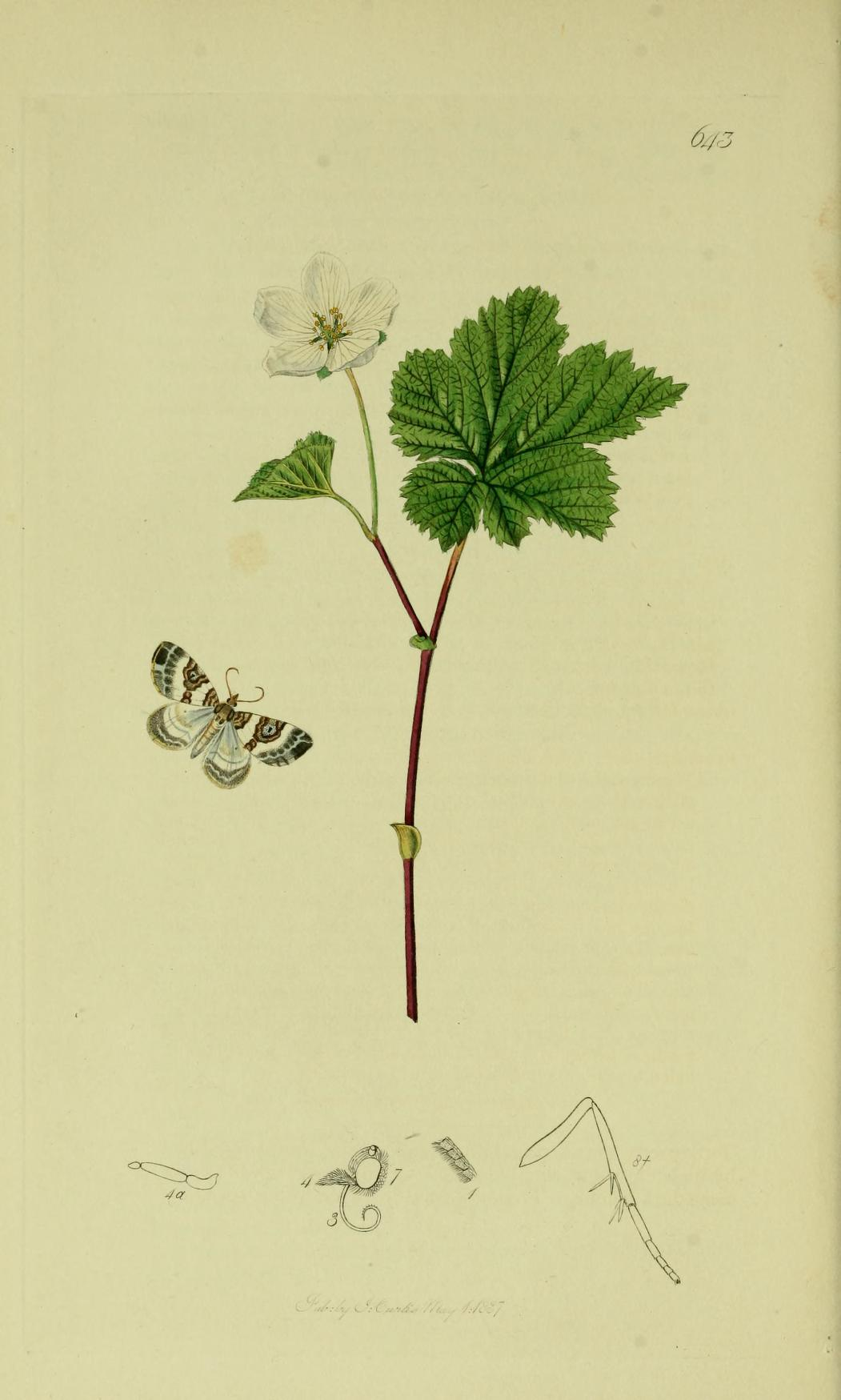
Illustration from John Curtis's British Entomology Volume 6

== Description ==
The wingspan is 22–28 mm. The ground colour of the forewings is milky white. The basal field is light brown to black brown. A large light brown to black-brown stain on the costa near the centre stands out. The intensity and shape of this spot can vary. From the apex area runs a blue-grey marginal band which continues on the hindwings usually in an attenuated form. A thin white squiggly line is visible in this band. The forewings and hindwings each show a black discal fleck, which can be sometimes be very unclear. "White, more glossy than in any succeeding species of the group, yet more thinly scaled than ocellata. Forewing with brown basal patch and anterior half of median band, both wings with more or less well-defined bluish-smoky distal border. — ab. parvula Retz. has, in addition a dark spot at the middle of the hindmargin of the forewing. — In ab. guttata Huene the median band is reduced to a mere spot surrounding the discal dot. — plumbata Curt. is a race which inhabits Scotland and the North of England. The median band is uninterrupted, or only very narrowly interrupted and the smoky dark bordering is usually intensified. Sometimes also there are traces of a narrow smoky band midway between the basal and median patches. — ab. fumosa Prout is an extreme aberration, not infrequent among the race plumbata, in which the ground-colour of the forewing is in part or wholly suffused with smoke-colour, sometimes so deeply as almost entirely to obliterate the markings. Hindwing also sometimes infuscated. — maritima Strand is given as a Norwegian race, smaller than the type, with the marginal band of the forewing black-grey, not or scarcely interrupted, etc. — dahurica Stgr. from Dauria and Japan, is yellowish white, with the basal and costal patches light brown, the dark borders weak. Adult caterpillars are greenish colored. On the dorsum and sides they have several yellowish lines and stripes. At the end of the body there are two short tips. The pupa is light green. Shortly before the hatching of the moths, the dark elements of the front wings shimmer through the wing sheaths.

The moth flies from June to the beginning of September and the species overwinters as an egg in the fork of a twig.

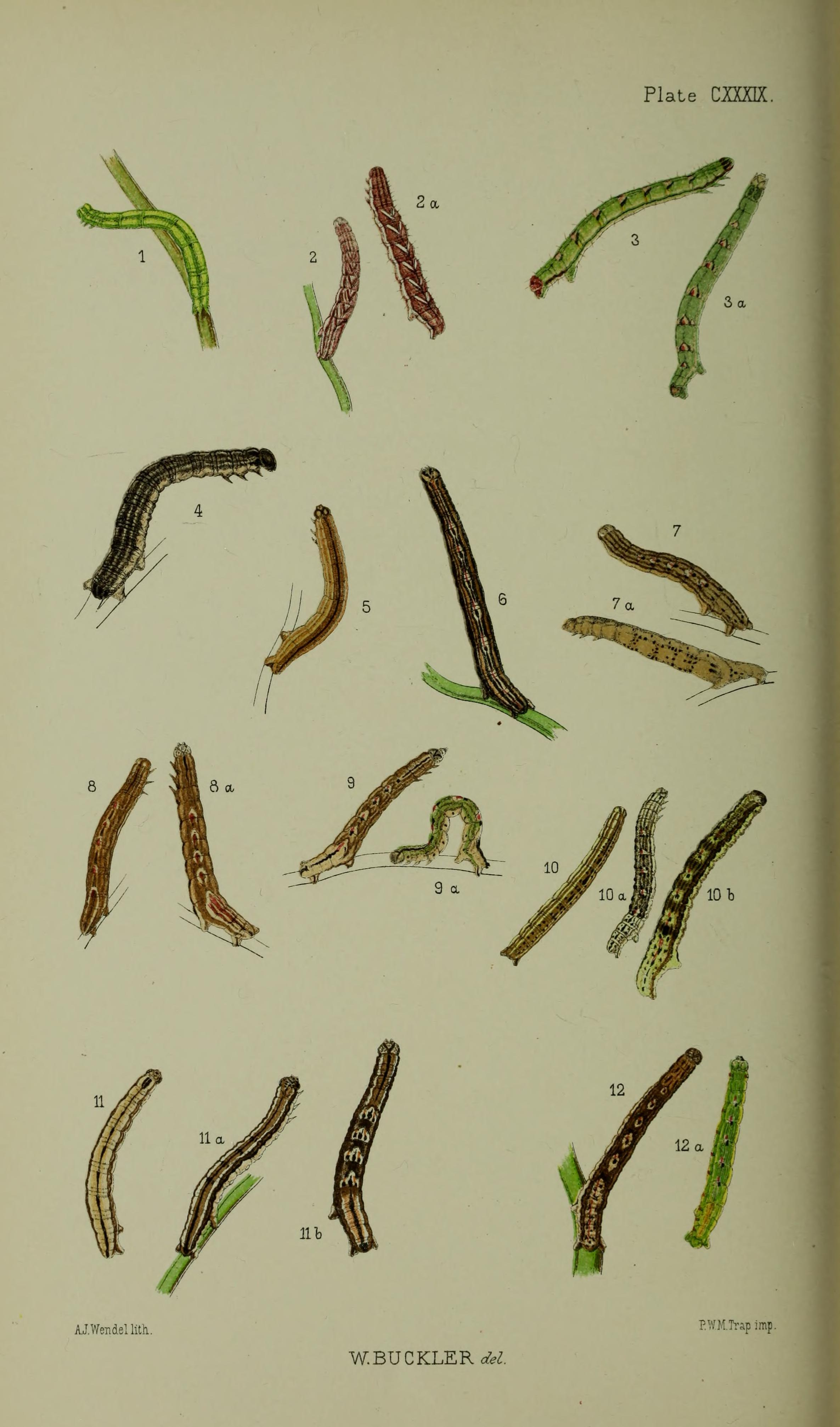
Fig.1 larvae after final moult

Larvae can be found from April to June and are easily beaten from the foodplant by day.

They feed on many kinds of trees and bushes, including alder (Alnus glutinosa), blackthorn (Prunus spinosa), birches (Betula species), hawthorn (Crataegus monogyna), plum (Prunus domestica) and apple (Malus domestica).

Preferred habit are areas of hedges, forests, orchards and gardens.

== Subspecies ==
- Plemyria rubiginata rubiginata
- Plemyria rubiginata plumbata Curtis, 1837 Scotland
- Plemyria rubiginata dahurica (Staudinger, 1892) Japan

== Distribution ==
The distribution area extends through western and central Europe including the British Isles, and continues through the temperate zone of the Palearctic to the Russian Far East Siberia and Japan. It rises to an elevation of 1500 metres in the Alps.

== Similar species ==
- Melanthia alaudaria is smaller and also differs by clear white tips that protrude into the very dark marginal area.
- Melanthia procellata is recognizable by an almost square white spot in the dark marginal band.
- Mesoleuca albicillata lacks the large discal spot on the front wings. The same applies to Catarhoe cuculata and Ligdia adustata. The latter also always shows a white field at the front wing tip.

== Notes ==
1. The flight season refers to Belgium and the Netherlands. This may vary in other parts of the range.
