= Nyctosia tenebrosa =

Scientific classification
- Kingdom: Animalia
- Phylum: Arthropoda
- Clade: Pancrustacea
- Class: Insecta
- Order: Lepidoptera
- Superfamily: Noctuoidea
- Family: Erebidae
- Subfamily: Arctiinae
- Genus: Nyctosia
- Species: N. tenebrosa

Binomial name
- Nyctosia tenebrosa (Walker, 1866)

Synonyms
- Apistosia tenebrosa Walker, 1866; Ctenucha proxima H. Edwards, 1884

Species of moth

Nyctosia tenebrosa is a moth of the subfamily Arctiinae. It was described by Francis Walker in 1866. It is found in Mexico and Guatemala.
