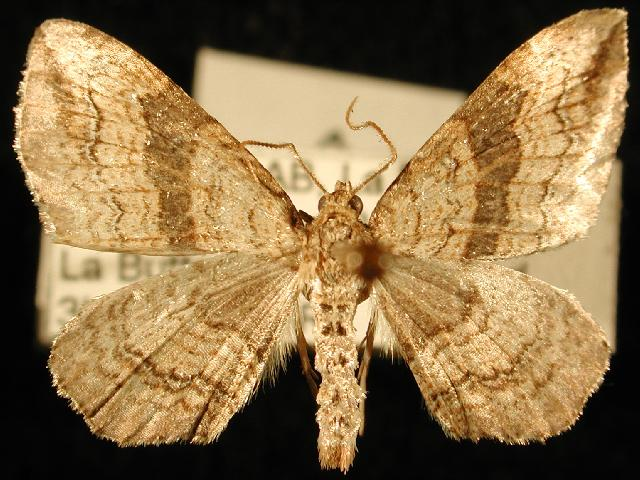

Scientific classification
- Domain: Eukaryota
- Kingdom: Animalia
- Phylum: Arthropoda
- Class: Insecta
- Order: Lepidoptera
- Family: Geometridae
- Tribe: Xanthorhoini
- Genus: Orthonama
- Species: O. evansi

Binomial name
- Orthonama evansi McDunnough, 1920

= Orthonama evansi =

Species of moth

Orthonama evansi is a species of geometrid moth in the family Geometridae. It is found in North America.

The MONA or Hodges number for Orthonama evansi is 7415.
