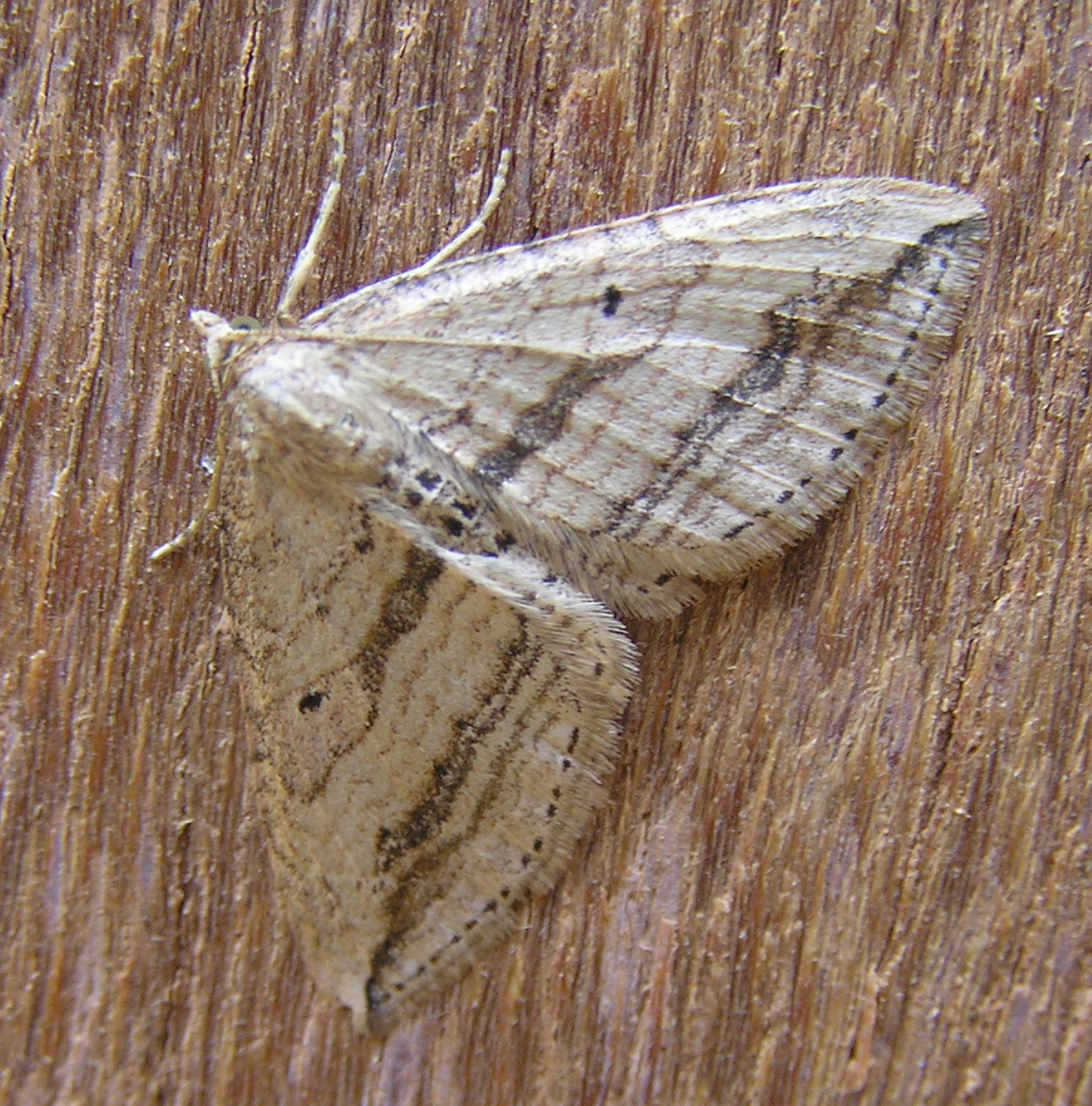

Scientific classification
- Domain: Eukaryota
- Kingdom: Animalia
- Phylum: Arthropoda
- Class: Insecta
- Order: Lepidoptera
- Family: Geometridae
- Genus: Orthonama
- Species: O. vittata

Binomial name
- Orthonama vittata (Borkhausen, 1794)

Synonyms
- Geometra lignata Hübner, 1799; Orthonama vittatum (lapsus)

= Orthonama vittata =

Oblique carpet

Species of moth

Orthonama vittata, the oblique carpet, is a moth of the family Geometridae. The species was first described by Moritz Balthasar Borkhausen in 1794. It is found throughout the Palearctic realm.

== Distribution ==
It is found from the Arctic Circle across Europe and Central Asia to Siberia. It also occurs in Turkey and Kazakhstan.

== Description ==
The wingspan is 23–26 mm. The length of the forewings is 11–14 mm. The ground colour of the forewings is light brownish white. There are several crosslines almost parallel to the hind margin. In the midfield, a narrow dark band is present. A black distal dividing line joins the apex. At the margin is a line composed of small black dots. The hindwings are paler and provided with several poorly developed dark lines. All wings show a small black discal fleck.

== Biology ==
The moth flies from the beginning of May to mid-September.

The caterpillars feed on various species of bedstraw.

Habitat: prefers moist meadows, forest clearings, and coastal wetlands.

== Notes ==
1. The flight season refers to Belgium and the Netherlands. This may vary in other parts of the range.
