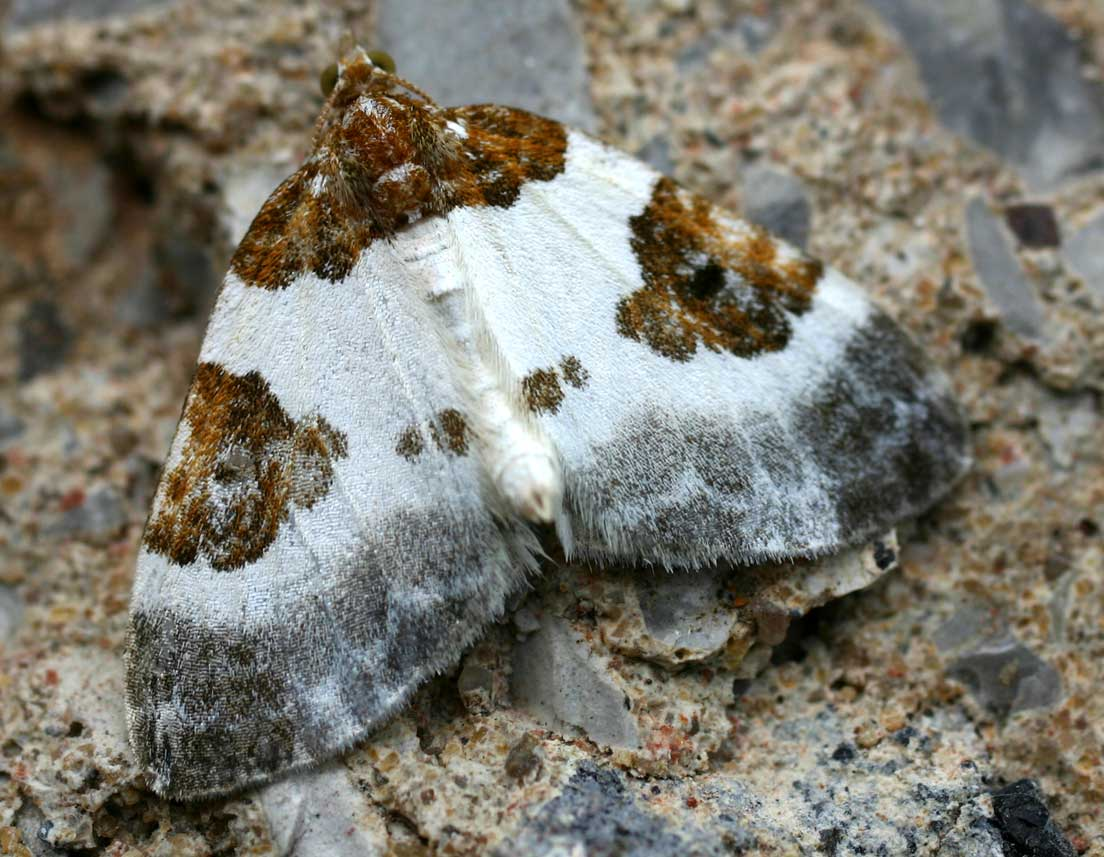
- Plemyria rubiginata

Scientific classification
- Kingdom: Animalia
- Phylum: Arthropoda
- Clade: Pancrustacea
- Class: Insecta
- Order: Lepidoptera
- Family: Geometridae
- Tribe: Hydriomenini
- Genus: Plemyria; Hübner, 1825

= Plemyria =

Genus of moths

"Plemyria" was also invalidly established by Hübner for another geometer moth genus; see Orthonama.

Plemyria is a genus of moths in the family Geometridae erected by Jacob Hübner in 1825.

== Species ==
- Plemyria rubiginata (Denis & Schiffermüller, 1775) – blue-bordered carpet
- Plemyria georgii Hulst, 1896
