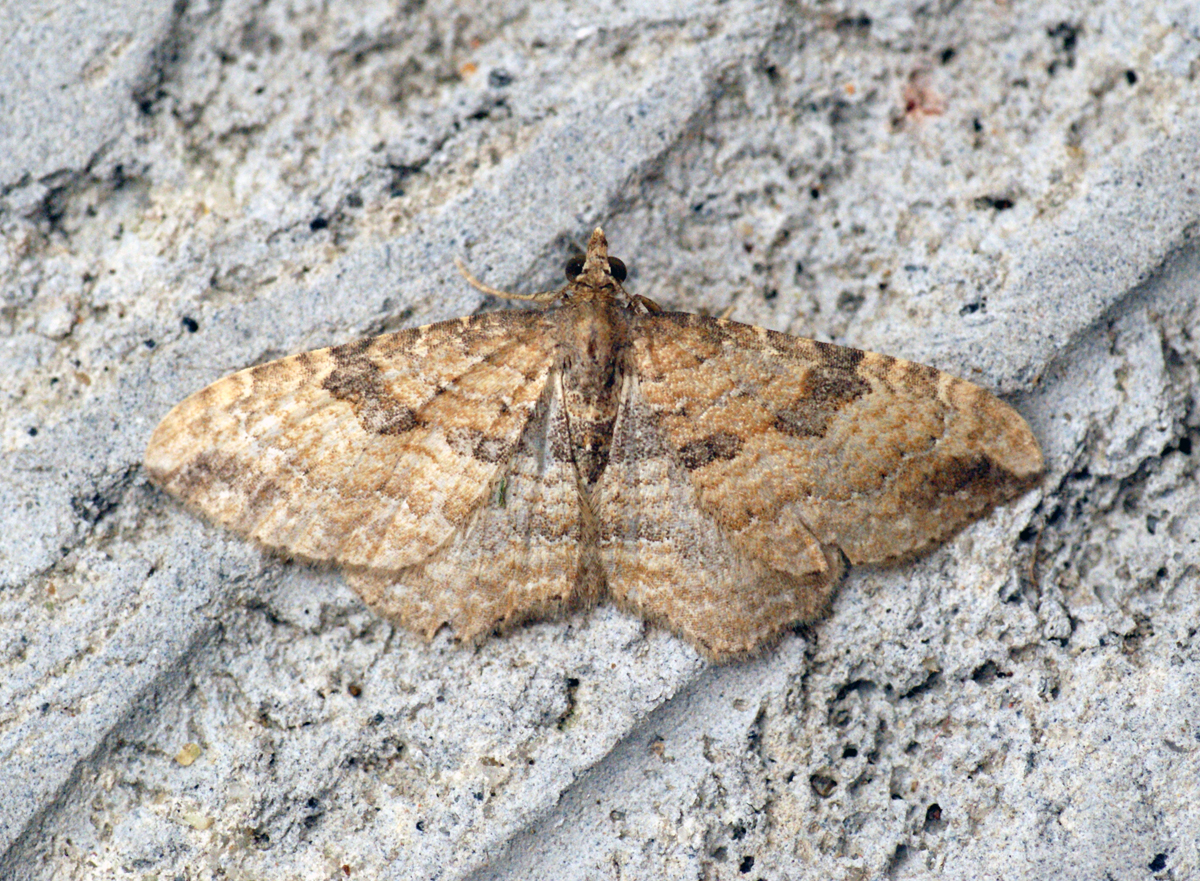

Scientific classification
- Domain: Eukaryota
- Kingdom: Animalia
- Phylum: Arthropoda
- Class: Insecta
- Order: Lepidoptera
- Family: Geometridae
- Genus: Orthonama
- Species: O. obstipata

Binomial name
- Orthonama obstipata (Fabricius, 1794)

Synonyms
- Numerous, see text

= Orthonama obstipata =

Species of moth

Orthonama obstipata, the gem, is a moth of the family Geometridae. The species was first described by Johan Christian Fabricius in 1794. It is a cosmopolitan species. In continental Europe though in the northeast, its range does not significantly extend beyond the Baltic region and it is absent from northern Russia. This well-flying species is prone to vagrancy and able to cross considerable distances of the open sea; it can thus be regularly found on the British Isles (though mainly in the south) and even on Iceland.

Under its junior synonyms Nycterosea brunneipennis and Geometra fluviata, the gem is the type species of genera Nycterosea and Percnoptilota, respectively. The latter is treated as a junior synonym of the former, but Nycterosea, though usually included in Orthonama these days, may warrant recognition as an independent genus after all.

== Description and ecology ==
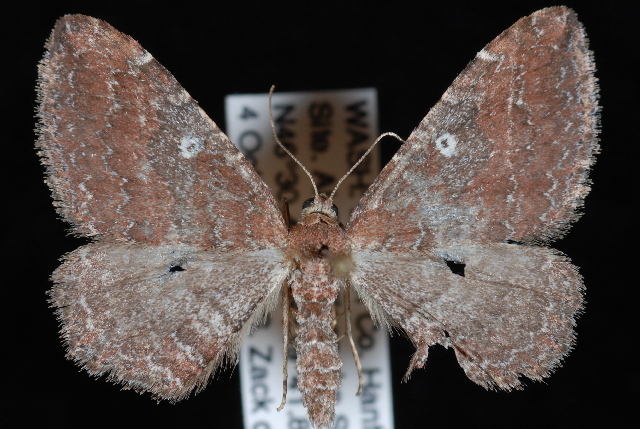
female. British Columbia

The adult's wingspan is 18–21 mm (0.71–0.83 in); in their core range (e.g. Belgium and the Netherlands) they can be seen between April and November, but in outlying regions, they may only be regularly encountered in late summer and early autumn, when vagrant individuals abound. This species is strongly sexually dimorphic: Males are light brown with a wavy pattern of whitish lines and a broad darker band running across the wings, forming concentric semicircles when the moth is at rest. There is a small whitish-rimmed black spot within the darker band between the centre and the leading edge of each forewing. The females are slightly larger and much darker, almost uniformly blackish brown with an indistinct lighter pattern and a forewing spot like the males have.

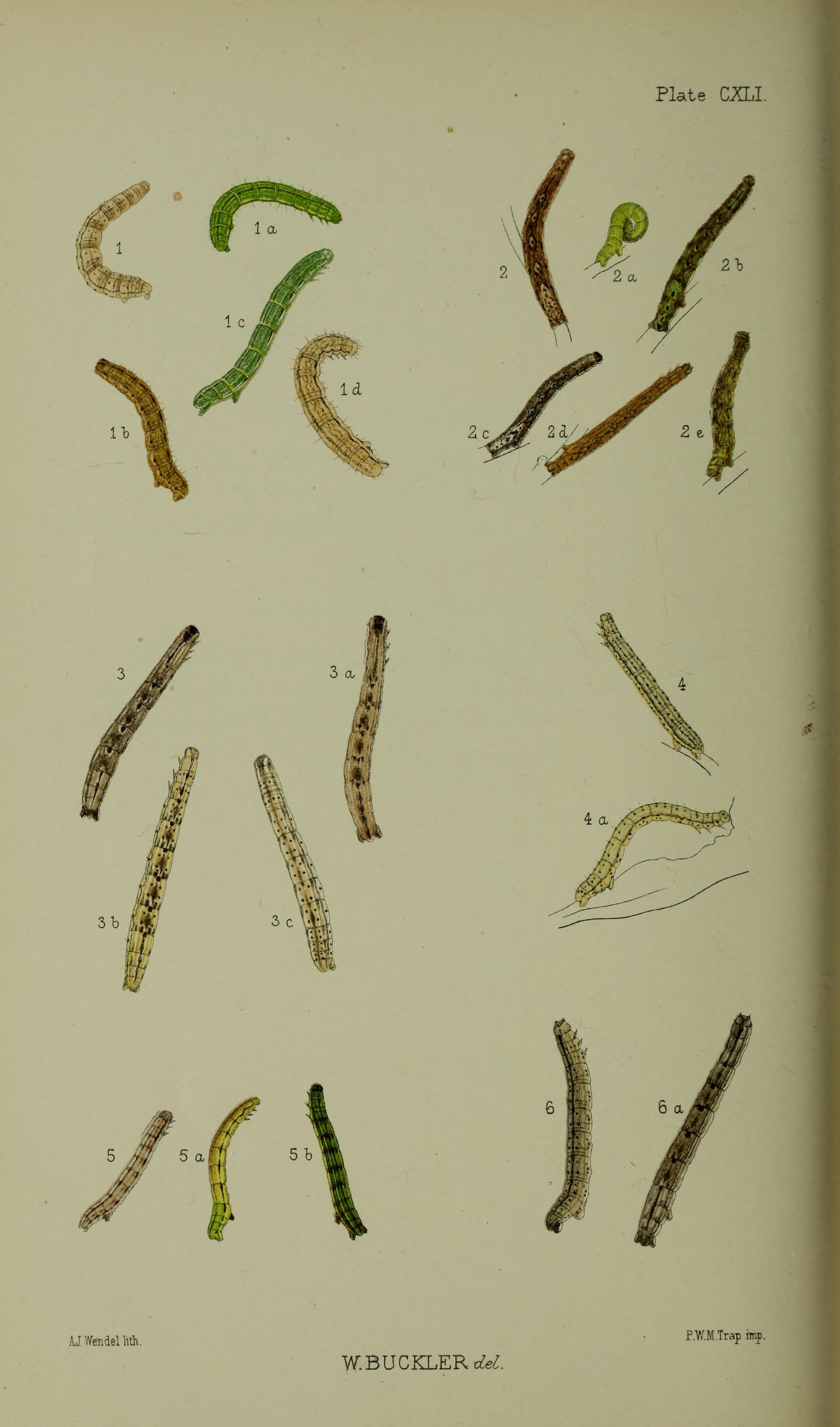
Figs 2, 2a, 2b, 2c, 2d, 2e larvae in various stages

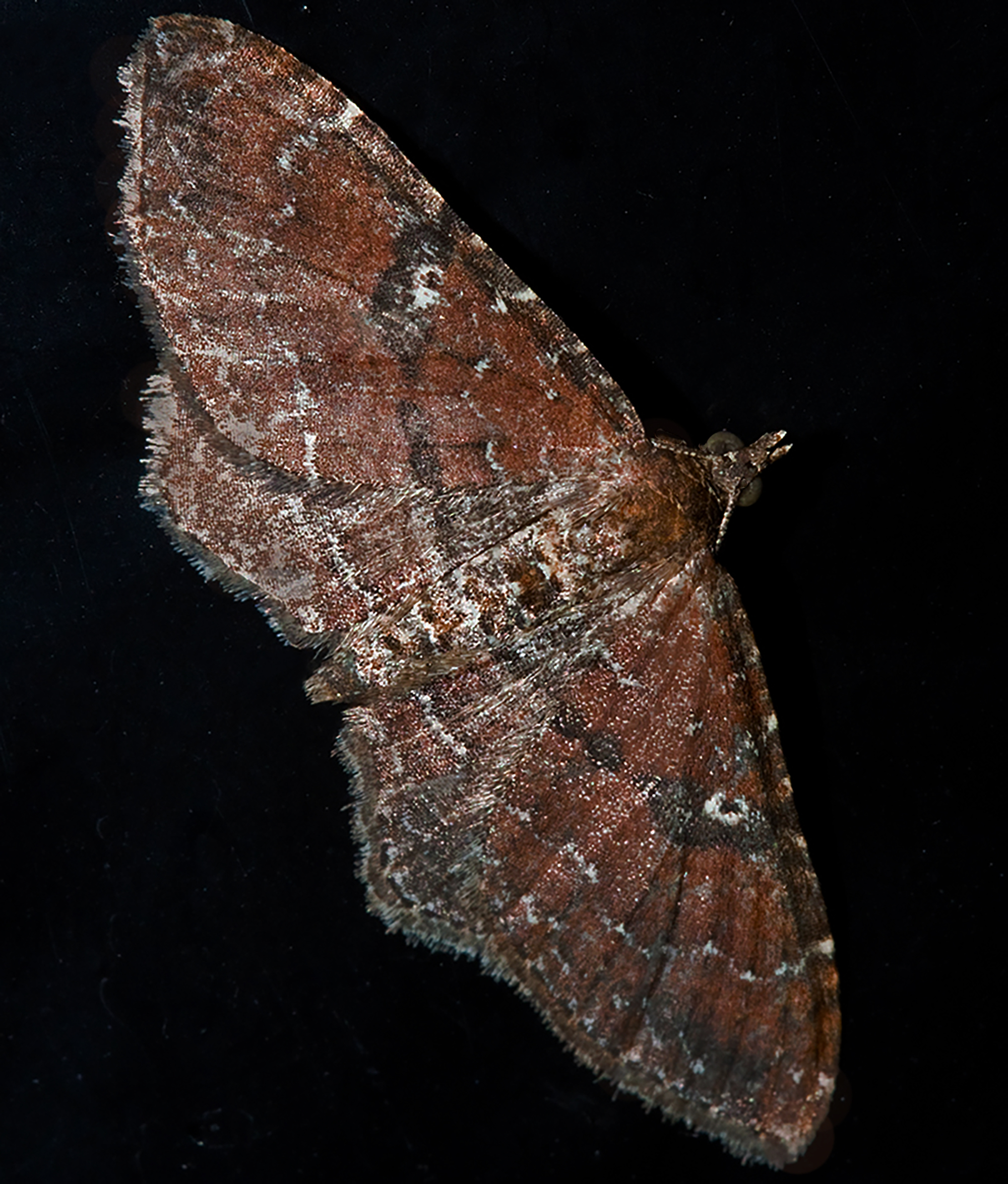
The Gem - Hodges#7414 (Orthonama obstipata)

Adult caterpillars are greenish or brownish coloured and slightly tapered towards the head. The sides are yellowish, and from the middle body segments light, dark-lined diamond spots which are black cored stand out.

== Similar species ==
Due to the very characteristic wing drawing, the female moths are unmistakable. In the males, there is a distant resemblance to grey-brown specimens of Xanthorhoe designata. In X. designata the midfield is, though, predominantly reddish-brown and bounded by a narrow black band.

== Biology ==
The caterpillar larvae feed on a wide range of low-growing core eudicots, but prefer asterids. Host plants recorded from the Central European part of its range include:

Euasterids I

- Gentianales: Rubiaceae
  - Galium (bedstraws)
- Solanales: Convolvulaceae
  - Convolvulus (true bindweeds)

Euasterids II

- Asterales: Asteraceae
  - Anthemis (dog-fennels)
  - Chrysanthemum (chrysanthemums)
  - Eupatorium (bonesets)
  - Senecio (ragworts and groundsels) – e.g. common groundsel (S. vulgaris) in the British Isles

Eurosids II

- Brassicales: Brassicaceae
  - Alyssum (alyssums)
  - Nasturtium (watercresses)

Basal core eudicots

- Caryophyllales: Polygonaceae
  - Polygonum (knotweed)
  - Rumex (docks and sorrels)

== Synonyms ==
The widespread, strongly sexually dimorphic and somewhat phenotypically variable gem has been described anew time and again by various authors, even as late as the early 20th century, but all these supposedly distinct taxa are nowadays considered to refer to a single species. Junior synonyms of the gem include:

- Camptogramma baccata Guenée, [1858]
- Camptogramma exagitata Walker, 1862
- Camptogramma signataria Walker, [1863]
- Cidaria peracutata Walker, 1862
- Cidaria plemyrata Felder & Rogenhofer, 1875
- Coremia obruptata Walker, [1863]
- Coremia pigrata Walker, 1866
- Geometra fluviata Hübner, [1799]
- Geometra fuviata (lapsus)
- Geometra gemmata Hübner, [1799]
- Larentia gemmaria Boisduval, 1840
- Larentia quaerendaria Costa, [1850]
- Nycterocea brunneipennis Hulst, 1896
- Nycterocea obstipata (lapsus)
- Nycterosea obstipata Fabricius, 1794)
- Ochyria discata Warren, 1905
- Ochyria inconspicua Warren, 1896
- Orthonama albicinctata (Haworth, 1809)
- Orthonama alternata (Walker, 1866)
- Orthonama angustata (Haworth, 1809)
- Orthonama baccata (Guenée, 1857)
- Orthonama brunneipennis (Hulst, 1896)
- Orthonama exagitata (Walker, 1862)
- Orthonama fluviata (Hübner, [1799])
- Orthonama gemmaria (Boisduval, 1840)
- Orthonama gemmata (Hübner, [1799])
- Orthonama intrusata (Walker, 1862)
- Orthonama lapillata (Guenée, 1857)
- Orthonama marginata (Mathew, 1906)
- Orthonama mortuaria (Schaus, 1908)
- Orthonama obruptata (Walker, 1863)
- Orthonama obsoleta (Mathew, 1906)
- Orthonama obstipatum (lapsus)
- Orthonama olivacea (Mathew, 1906)
- Orthonama peracutata (Walker, 1862)
- Orthonama pigrata (Walker, 1866)
- Orthonama signataria (Walker, 1863)
- Phalaena albicinctata Haworth, 1809
- Phalaena angustata Haworth, 1809
- Phalaena obstipata Fabricius, 1794
