= Nyctosia coccinea =

Scientific classification
- Domain: Eukaryota
- Kingdom: Animalia
- Phylum: Arthropoda
- Class: Insecta
- Order: Lepidoptera
- Superfamily: Noctuoidea
- Family: Erebidae
- Subfamily: Arctiinae
- Genus: Nyctosia
- Species: N. coccinea

Binomial name
- Nyctosia coccinea Schaus, 1899

Species of moth

Nyctosia coccinea is a moth of the subfamily Arctiinae. It was described by William Schaus in 1899. It is found in Mexico.
