= Orthonama quadrisecta =

Scientific classification
- Domain: Eukaryota
- Kingdom: Animalia
- Phylum: Arthropoda
- Class: Insecta
- Order: Lepidoptera
- Family: Geometridae
- Genus: Orthonama
- Species: O. quadrisecta

Binomial name
- Orthonama quadrisecta Herbulot, 1954

Species of moth

Orthonama quadrisecta is a species of moth of the family Geometridae first described by Claude Herbulot in 1954. It is found on Madagascar, Réunion, Mauritius and the Comoros.

Its wingspan is around 18–21 mm.

The larvae feed on Polygonaceae (Rumex crispus)
