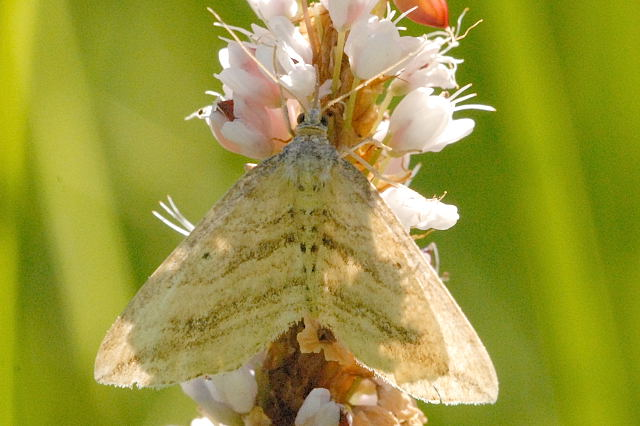
- Adult oblique carpet (O. vittata) at Commanster in the Belgian Ardennes

Scientific classification
- Kingdom: Animalia
- Phylum: Arthropoda
- Clade: Pancrustacea
- Class: Insecta
- Order: Lepidoptera
- Family: Geometridae
- Tribe: Xanthorhoini
- Genus: Orthonama; Hübner, 1825

Type species
- Geometra lignata Hübner, 1799

Species
- Several, see text

Synonyms
- Numerous, see text

= Orthonama =

Genus of moths

Orthonama is a genus of the geometer moth family (Geometridae). It belongs to the tribe Xanthorhoini of the "carpet" subfamily (Larentiinae). Nycterosea is usually included here by modern authors, but may in fact be distinct enough to warrant recognition as an independent genus. The genus was erected by Jacob Hübner in 1825.

== Selected species ==
Species of Orthonama (sensu lato) include:

- Orthonama centrostrigaria (Wollaston, 1858) (= O. interruptata, O. latirupta, O. luscinata, O. mediata, O. paranensis)
- Orthonama dicymanta Prout, 1929
- Orthonama discataria
- Orthonama evansi (McDunnough, 1920)
- Orthonama flavillacea
- Orthonama obstipata (Fabricius, 1794) – gem
- Orthonama plemyrata
- Orthonama quadrisecta Herbulot, 1954
- Orthonama vittata (Borkhausen, 1794) – oblique carpet

== Synonyms ==
Junior synonyms of Orthonama are:

- Nycterocea (lapsus)
- Nycterosea Hulst, 1896 (but see above)
- Nyctosia (lapsus; non Hampson, 1900: preoccupied)
- Orthonoma (lapsus)
- Percnoptilota Hulst, 1896
- Plemyria Hübner, 1825a (non Hübner, 1825b: preoccupied)
