= Nyctosia =

Scientific classification
- Domain: Eukaryota
- Kingdom: Animalia
- Phylum: Arthropoda
- Class: Insecta
- Order: Lepidoptera
- Superfamily: Noctuoidea
- Family: Erebidae
- Subfamily: Arctiinae
- Tribe: Lithosiini
- Genus: Nyctosia; Schaus, 1899

Genus of moths

"Nyctosia" is also a misspelling of the geometer moth genus Nycterosea, presently included in Orthonama.

Nyctosia is a genus of moths in the subfamily Arctiinae. It was described by William Schaus in 1899.

== Species ==
- Nyctosia coccinea Schaus, 1899
- Nyctosia poicilonotus Dyar, 1912
- Nyctosia tenebrosa Walker, 1866
