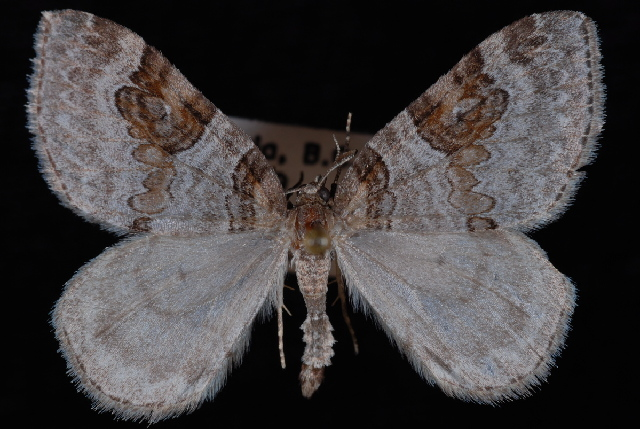

Scientific classification
- Kingdom: Animalia
- Phylum: Arthropoda
- Class: Insecta
- Order: Lepidoptera
- Family: Geometridae
- Genus: Plemyria
- Species: P. georgii

Binomial name
- Plemyria georgii Hulst, 1896

= Plemyria georgii =

Species of moth

Plemyria georgii, or George's carpet moth, is a species of geometrid moth in the family Geometridae. It is found in North America.

The MONA or Hodges number for Plemyria georgii is 7216.
