= List of geometrid genera: L =

The very large moth family Geometridae contains genera beginning with A, B, C, D, E, F, G, H, I, J, K, L, M, N, O, P, Q, R, S, T, U, V, W, X, Y and Z.

Those beginning with L include:

- Lacaria
- Lachnocephala
- Laciniodes
- Lacistophanes
- Lackrana
- Laginia
- Lagynopteryx
- Lagyra
- Lambdina
- Lambornia
- Lamelluncia
- Lampadopteryx
- Lamprocabera
- Lampropteryx
- Laneco
- Laninia
- Laophila
- Larentia
- Larentioides
- Larentiopsis
- Larerannis
- Larophylla
- Lasiochlora
- Lasioedma
- Lasiogma
- Lasiopates
- Lassaba
- Lathochlora
- Lathraeolis
- Laudosia
- Leiocera
- Lepiodes
- Leptacme
- Leptaletis
- Leptepistomion
- Leptidule
- Leptocolpia
- Leptoctenopsis
- Leptodontoptera
- Leptographa
- Leptolopha
- Leptomeris
- Leptomiza
- Leptosidia
- Leptostales
- Leptostegna
- Leptostichia
- Leucaniodes
- Leucesthes
- Leucataera
- Leuciris
- Leucobrephos
- Leucobursada
- Leucochesias
- Leucocora
- Leucoctenorrhoe
- Leucoglyphica
- Leucolithodes
- Leucomicra
- Leucophthalmia
- Leucoreas
- Leucoxena
- Leucula
- Leuculopsis
- Lhommeia
- Libanonia
- Ligdia
- Ligdiformia
- Lignypotera
- Ligonia
- Limbatochlamys
- Limeria
- Limonophila
- Liodesina
- Liometopa
- Lioptilesia
- Lipocentris
- Lipogonia
- Lipogya
- Lipomelia
- Liposchema
- Lipotaxia
- Lissoblemma
- Lissocharis
- Lissochlora
- Lissocraspeda
- Lissolica
- Lissomma
- Lissoplaga
- Lissostolodes
- Litbada
- Lithina
- Lithostege
- Llampidken
- Lobidiopteryx
- Lobocleta
- Lobocraspeda
- Lobogonia
- Lobogonodes
- Lobopalta
- Lobophora
- Lobophorodes
- Lobophysa
- Lobopola
- Lobura
- Lobus
- Locha
- Lomaspilis
- Lomographa
- Longipalpa
- Longula
- Lophobates
- Lophochlora
- Lophochorista
- Lophocrita
- Lophomachia
- Lophophelma
- Lophophleps
- Lophorrhachia
- Lophosigna
- Lophosis
- Lophosticha
- Lophostola
- Lophothalaina
- Lophothorax
- Louisproutia
- Loweria
- Loxapicia
- Loxaspilates
- Loxochila
- Loxofidonia
- Loxographe
- Loxomiza
- Loxopora
- Loxorhombia
- Loxotephria
- Luashia
- Lulavia
- Luxiaria
- Lycauges
- Lycaugidia
- Lychnographa
- Lychnosea
- Lycia
- Lyelliana
- Lygranoa
- Lygridopsis
- Lygris
- Lysopteryx
- Lythria
- Lytrosis
