= Habenaria delavayi =

Conservation status
- Vulnerable (IUCN 3.1)
- CITES Appendix II

Scientific classification
- Kingdom: Plantae
- Clade: Tracheophytes
- Clade: Angiosperms
- Clade: Monocots
- Order: Asparagales
- Family: Orchidaceae
- Subfamily: Orchidoideae
- Genus: Habenaria
- Species: H. delavayi

Binomial name
- Habenaria delavayi Finet

Synonyms
- Pecteilis delavayi (Finet) M.A.Clem. & D.L.Jones; Habenaria yunnanensis Rolfe

Species of flowering plant

Habenaria delavayi, also known as hou ban yu feng hua (Chinese: 厚瓣玉凤花), is a species of orchid endemic to China.

== Distribution and habitat ==
Habenaria delavayi is found only in the Chinese provinces of Guizhou, Sichuan, and Yunnan. It grows in forests and grasslands at elevations of 1,500–3,000 m (4,900–9,800 ft).

== Description ==
Habenaria delavayi is a herbaceous plant arising from fleshy tubers. The upright stem measures 3–5 mm (0.12–0.20 in) in diameter with one or two tubular sheaths. Each plant typically has three or four leaves arranged in a basal rosette, though some plants may have as many as six leaves. The leaves measure approximately 1.5–5 cm (0.59–1.97 in) by 1.5–4 cm (0.59–1.57 in) and are circular or egg shaped with a rounded base and a pointed tip. The inflorescence is a raceme growing 6–15 cm (2.4–5.9 in) tall and bearing seven to twenty white flowers. The dorsal sepal is concave and elliptic in shape, measuring approximately 4 m (13 ft) by 4 mm (0.16 in). The reflexed lateral sepals are lanceolate and measure 4–5 mm (0.16–0.20 in) by 2.5 mm (0.098 in). The petals are linear and twisted at the base, measuring 6 mm (0.24 in) by 0.8 mm (0.031 in). The labellum is split into three long, narrow lobes. The nectar spur is 1.2–1.4 cm (0.47–0.55 in) long and slightly curved.

== Ecology ==
Habenaria delavayi is a terrestrial plant that flowers from June to August. It is exclusively pollinated by nocturnal moths, including Deilephila elpenor subsp. lewisii, Panchrysia ornata, Polychrysia imperatrix, Thysanoplusia intermixta, alongside species of Apamea and Odontopera.
