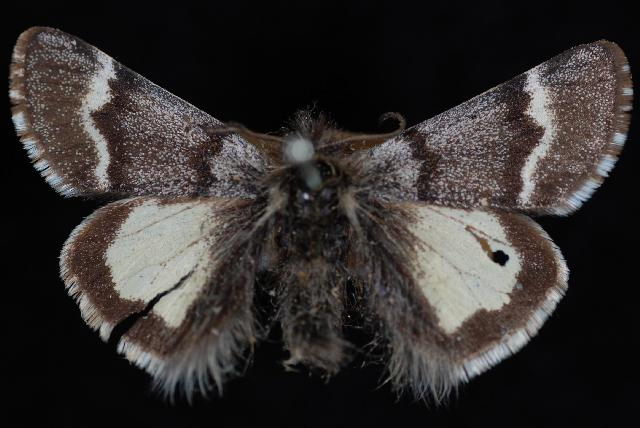

Scientific classification
- Kingdom: Animalia
- Phylum: Arthropoda
- Class: Insecta
- Order: Lepidoptera
- Family: Geometridae
- Genus: Leucobrephos
- Species: L. brephoides

Binomial name
- Leucobrephos brephoides (Walker, 1857)

Synonyms
- Anarta brephoides Walker, 1857

= Leucobrephos brephoides =

Species of moth

Leucobrephos brephoides, the scarce infant moth, is a moth of the family Geometridae. The species was first described by Francis Walker in 1857. It is found in North America from Yukon to Labrador and south to New York and southern Alberta and British Columbia.

The wingspan is about 29 mm. Adults are on wing from March to May with a peak in mid to late April in Alberta.

The larvae feed on Populus tremuloides, Betula papyrifera and Alnus, but have also been recorded on Salix and Populus balsamifera.
