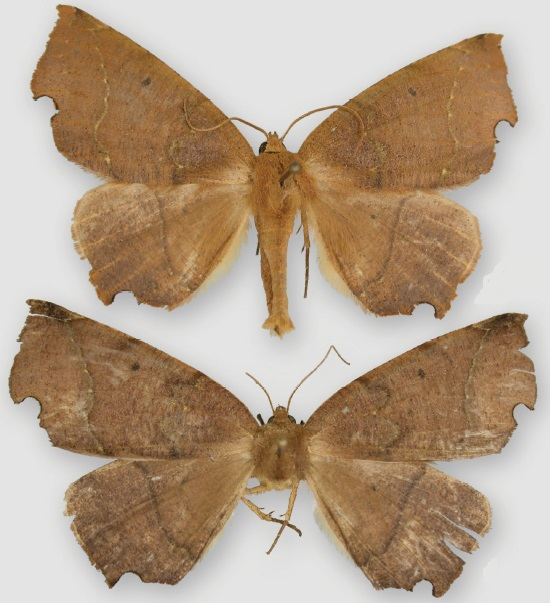

Scientific classification
- Domain: Eukaryota
- Kingdom: Animalia
- Phylum: Arthropoda
- Class: Insecta
- Order: Lepidoptera
- Family: Geometridae
- Genus: Phyllodonta
- Species: P. intermediata

Binomial name
- Phyllodonta intermediata Sullivan, 2014

= Phyllodonta intermediata =

Species of moth

Phyllodonta intermediata is a moth in the family Geometridae first described by J. Bolling Sullivan in 2014. It is found in the Talamancas and Central Volcanic and Tilarán ranges in Costa Rica, possibly extending into the other Costa Rican mountain ranges and northern Panama. It has been recorded from elevations between 1,275 and 2,280 meters.

The length of the forewings is 21–25 mm for males and 22.5–26 mm for females. The forewings are warm brown with prominent undulating antemedial and postmedial lines. Both lines are black edged with lighter grayish scales proximally. There is black scaling distal to the reniform at the costa, forming a diffuse line parallel to the antemedial line. The reniform spot is small, black and forms a center of a gray circle. The hindwings have a prominent postmedial line, as well as a margin with a submedial notch. Adults are probably on wing year round.

== Etymology ==
The species is named for the intermediate elevations between 1,200 and 1,580 meters where most of the specimens were taken.
