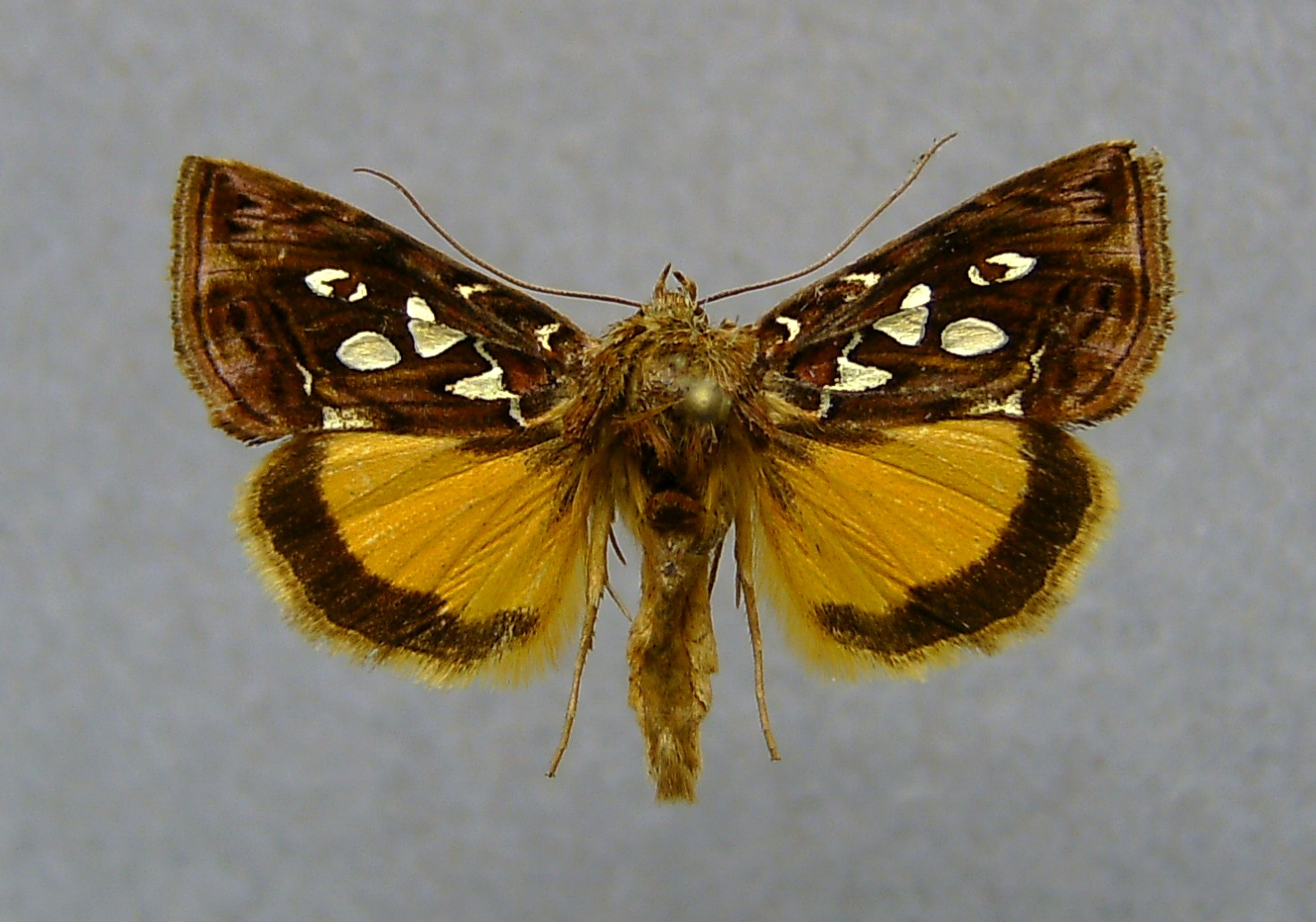

Scientific classification
- Domain: Eukaryota
- Kingdom: Animalia
- Phylum: Arthropoda
- Class: Insecta
- Order: Lepidoptera
- Superfamily: Noctuoidea
- Family: Noctuidae
- Genus: Panchrysia
- Species: P. dives

Binomial name
- Panchrysia dives (Eversmann, 1844)

Synonyms
- Plusia dives Eversmann, 1844

= Panchrysia dives =

Species of moth

Panchrysia dives is a moth of the family Noctuidae. It is found from the Ural, east through southern Siberia to the Pacific Ocean. The range includes Kamchatka, Sakhalin and the Kuriles.
