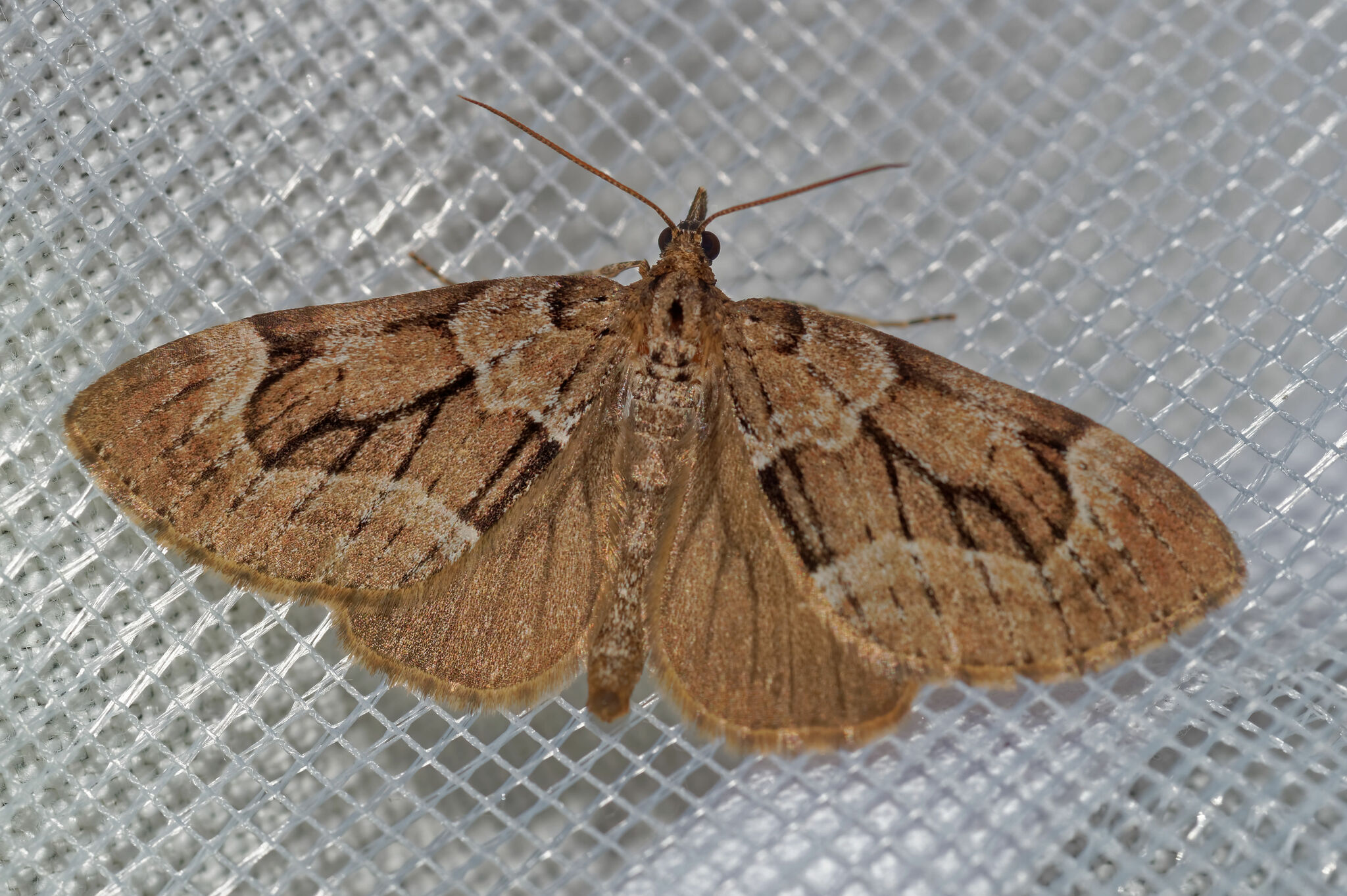
- Lobophorodes sabinata, France

Scientific classification
- Domain: Eukaryota
- Kingdom: Animalia
- Phylum: Arthropoda
- Class: Insecta
- Order: Lepidoptera
- Family: Geometridae
- Subfamily: Larentiinae
- Genus: Lobophorodes
- Species: L. sabinata

Binomial name
- Lobophorodes sabinata (Geyer, 1831)

Synonyms
- Epilobophora sabinata (Geyer, 1831); Geometra sabinata Geyer, 1831

= Lobophorodes sabinata =

Species of moth

Lobophorodes sabinata is a moth of the family Geometridae.

This species was formerly a member of the genus Epilobophora and is sometimes referred to as Epilobophora sabinata.

== Subspecies ==
Subspecies include:

- Lobophorodes sabinata sabinata (Geyer, 1831)
- Lobophorodes sabinata teriolensis (Kitt, 1932)

== Distribution ==
This species is present in Europe (Austria, France, Italy, Romania, Spain and Switzerland) It is limited to the Pyrenees and the Alpine Arc, at an elevation of 500–2,300 metres (1,600–7,500 ft) above sea level. but its range extends as far as Turkey. These moths can be found in mountain habitat, in sunny to partially shaded places, mainly in wasteland and open woodlands, in forests and other wooded areas, especially in high alpine valleys and subalpine conifer forests with large populations of the host plant.

== Description ==
Lobophorodes sabinata can reach a wingspan of 30–32 mm (1.2–1.3 in). These moths are characterized by their brown color, with a darker brown transversal band.

== Biology ==
Lobophorodes sabinata is a single-brood species (univoltine species. Adults fly at night from May to August. Caterpillars are monophagous, they feed on Juniperus sabina (hence the species name) and overwinter.

== Bibliography ==
- Guggemoos, T. (2016): Epilobophora sabinata ssp. teriolensis (Kitt, 1932) im Ammergebirge – Erstnachweis für Deutschland (Insecta: Lepidoptera: Geometridae). — Beiträge zur bayerischen Entomofaunistik 16: 15–18.
- Hausmann A. & J. Viidalepp (2012): The Geometrid Moths of Europe - Volume 3: Apollo Books 507, Nr. 259
- Hübner, J. [1790-1833]: Sammlung europäischer Schmetterlinge 5: pl. 1–113.
- Schmid, J. (2007): Kritische Liste der Schmetterlinge Graubündens und ihrer geographischen Verbreitung. Grossschmetterlinge 'Macrolepidoptera'. Eigenverlag, Ilanz. 94pp 53
- SwissLepTeam (2010): Die Schmetterlinge (Lepidoptera) der Schweiz: Eine kommentierte, systematisch-faunistische Liste. Fauna Helvetica 25. Neuchâtel (CSCF & SEG) Nr. 8673
- Viidalepp, J. & Hausmann, A. - The Geometrid Moths of Europe, vol. 3 (Larentiinae I). in Apollo Books, Stenstrup, 550 pp. & 24 colour pls. 2009
- Vorbrodt, K. & Müller-Rutz, J. (1913-1914): Die Schmetterlinge der Schweiz. Band 2 (inkl. 2. Nachtrag) - Druck und Verlag K.J.Wyss, Bern 43, Nr. 914
