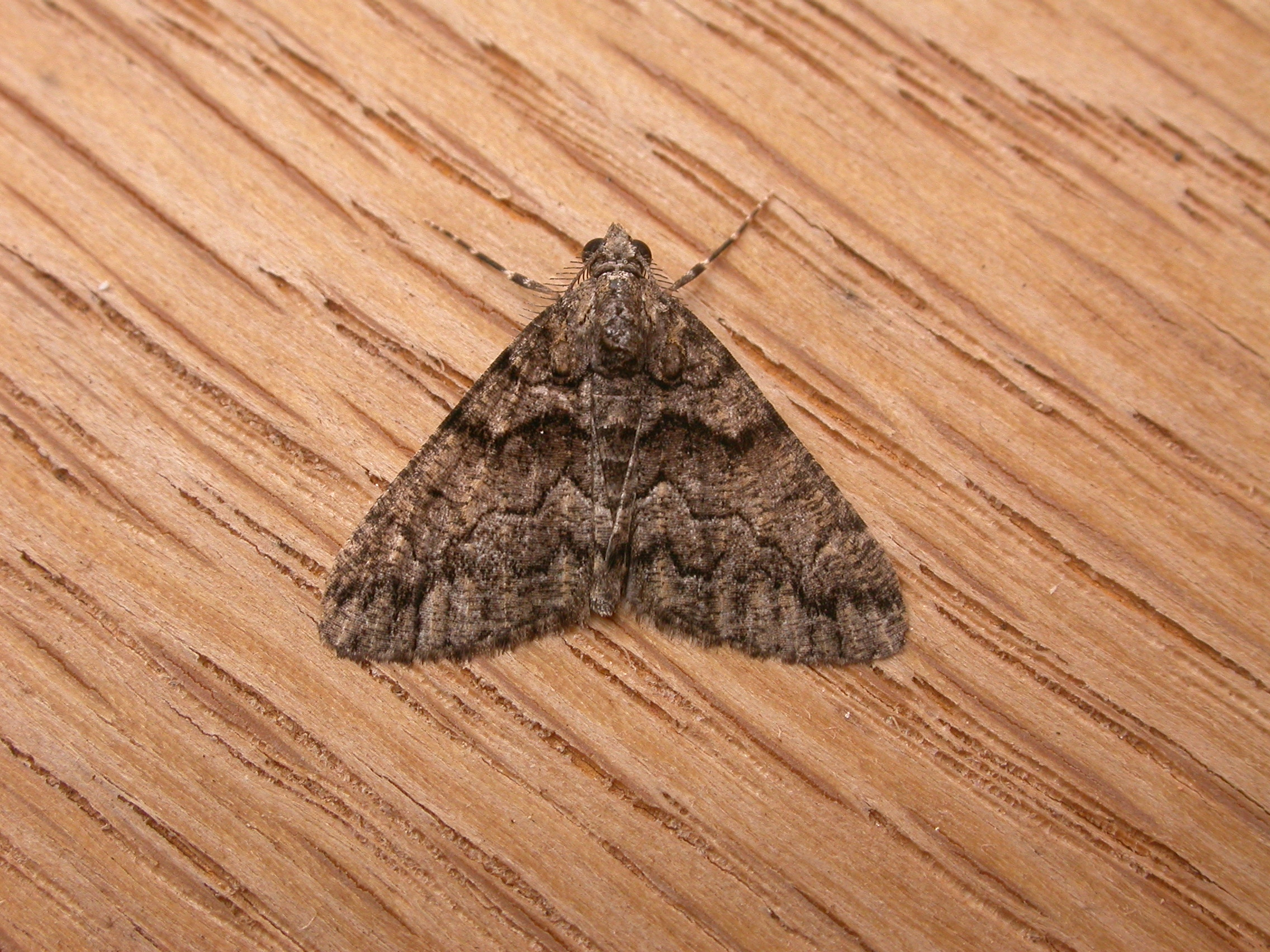

Scientific classification
- Kingdom: Animalia
- Phylum: Arthropoda
- Class: Insecta
- Order: Lepidoptera
- Family: Geometridae
- Genus: Lipogya
- Species: L. exprimataria

Binomial name
- Lipogya exprimataria (Walker, 1863)

Synonyms
- Larentia exprimataria Walker, 1863; Boarmia metapolia Turner, 1947

= Lipogya exprimataria =

Species of moth

Lipogya exprimataria is a species of moth of the family Geometridae first described by Francis Walker in 1863. It is found in Australia.
