= Aethiopodes =

Scientific classification
- Kingdom: Animalia
- Phylum: Arthropoda
- Clade: Pancrustacea
- Class: Insecta
- Order: Lepidoptera
- Family: Geometridae
- Subfamily: Ennominae
- Tribe: Gonodontini
- Genus: Aethiopodes; Warren, 1902

Type species
- Azelina indecoraria Walker, 1866

Genus of geometer moths

Aethiopodes are a genus in the geometer moth family (Geometridae). Sometimes included in Odontopera, other authors treat it as distinct. If valid, it is a small genus with just about 10 species from southern Africa.

Species include:

- Aethiopodes indecoraria Walker, 1866
- Aethiopodes perplexata
- Aethiopodes saxeticola Krüger, 2005
- Aethiopodes staudei
