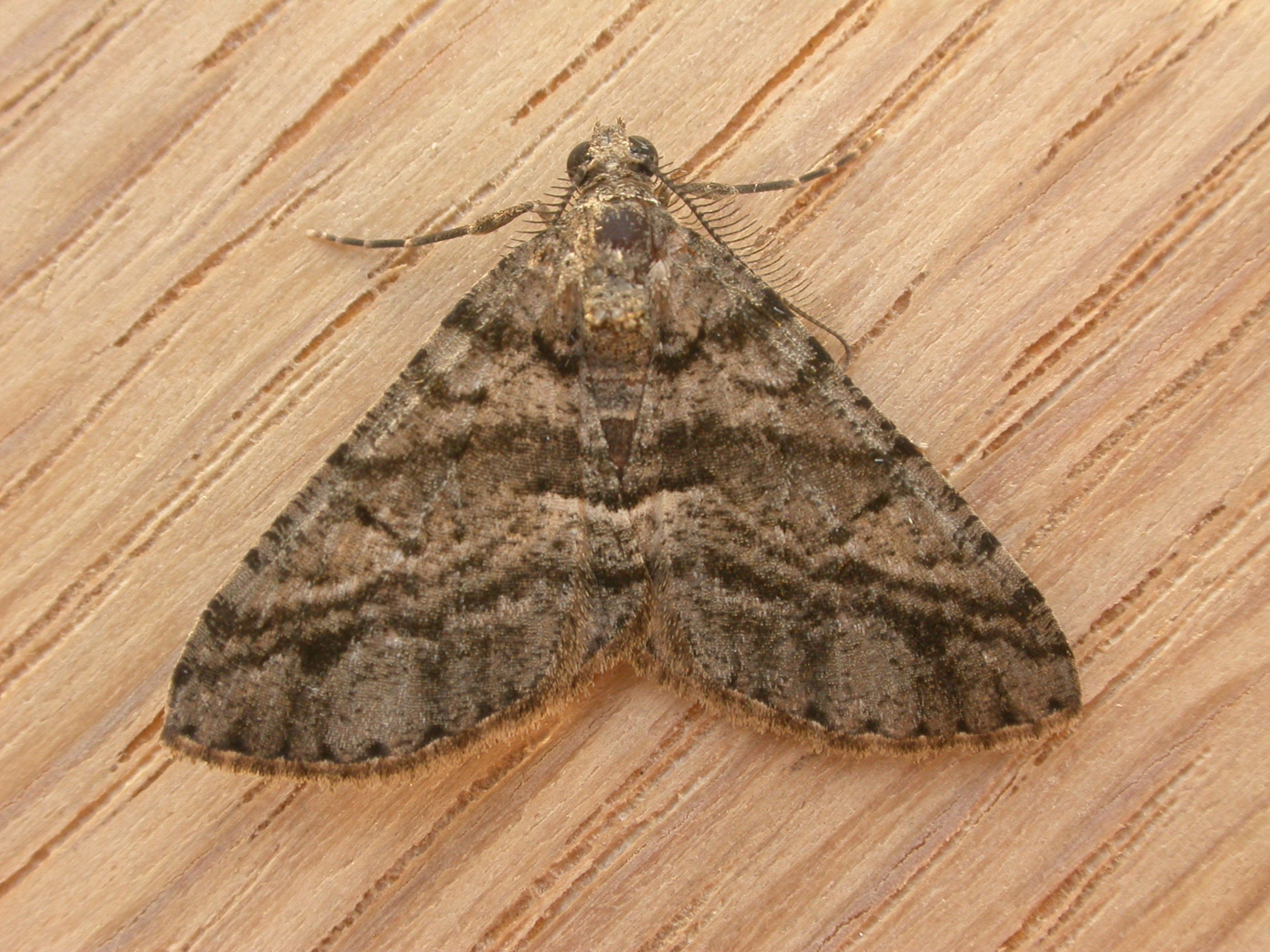

Scientific classification
- Kingdom: Animalia
- Phylum: Arthropoda
- Class: Insecta
- Order: Lepidoptera
- Family: Geometridae
- Genus: Lipogya
- Species: L. eutheta

Binomial name
- Lipogya eutheta Turner, 1917

= Lipogya eutheta =

Species of moth

Lipogya eutheta, the grey bark moth, is a moth of the family Geometridae first described by Alfred Jefferis Turner in 1917. It is found in the Australian states of Queensland, New South Wales, and Victoria. They have a wingspan around 2.5 cm.
