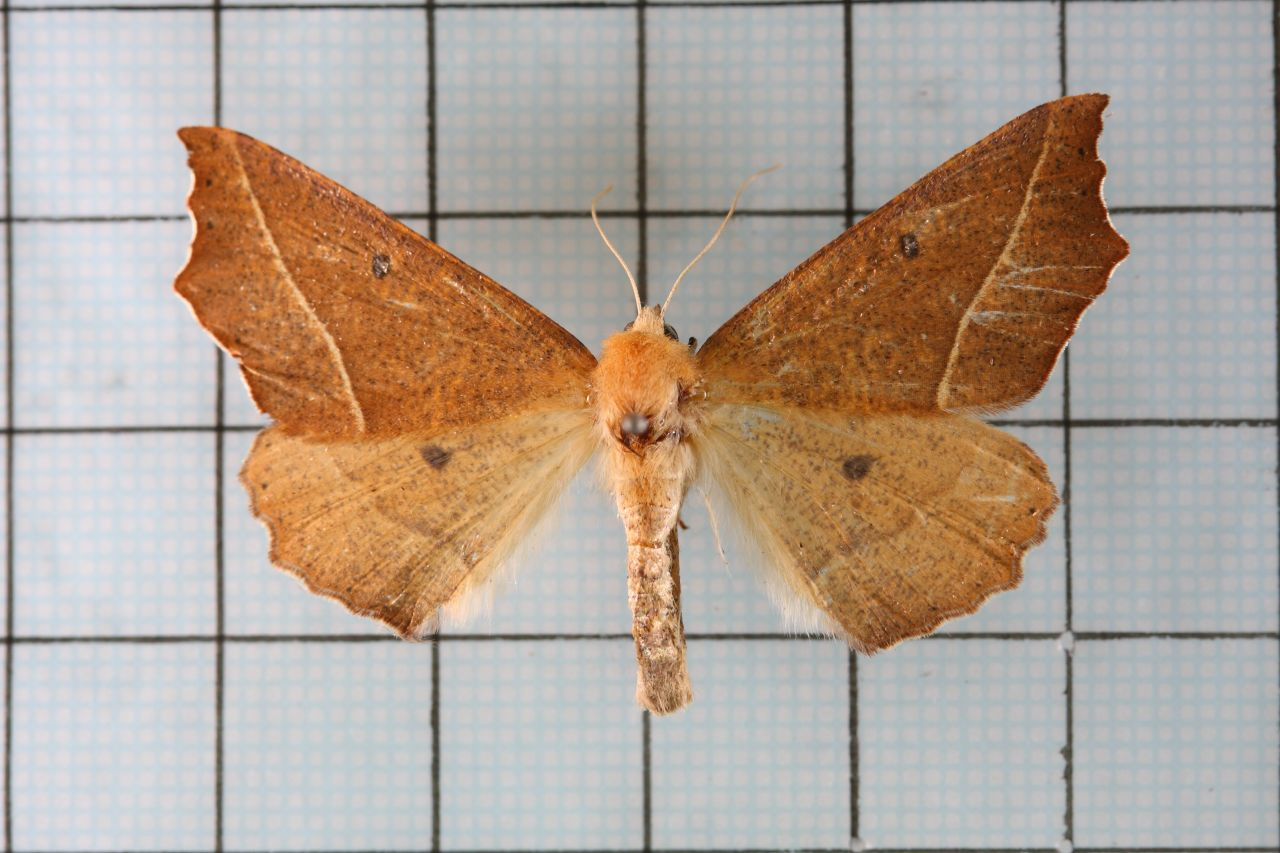
- Odontopera bilinearia subarida

Scientific classification
- Kingdom: Animalia
- Phylum: Arthropoda
- Class: Insecta
- Order: Lepidoptera
- Family: Geometridae
- Genus: Odontopera
- Species: O. bilinearia

Binomial name
- Odontopera bilinearia (C. Swinhoe, 1890)

Synonyms
- Crocallis bilinearia C. Swinhoe, 1890; Gonodontis coryphodes Wehrli, 1940; Gonodontis nephela Wehrli, 1940

= Odontopera bilinearia =

Species of moth

Odontopera bilinearia is a moth of the family Geometridae first described by Charles Swinhoe in 1890. It is found in Asia, including Taiwan, China and Bhutan.

== Subspecies ==
- Odontopera bilinearia bilinearia
- Odontopera bilinearia coryphodes (Wehrli, 1940)
- Odontopera bilinearia nephela (Wehrli, 1940)
- Odontopera bilinearia subarida Inoue, 1986 (Taiwan)
