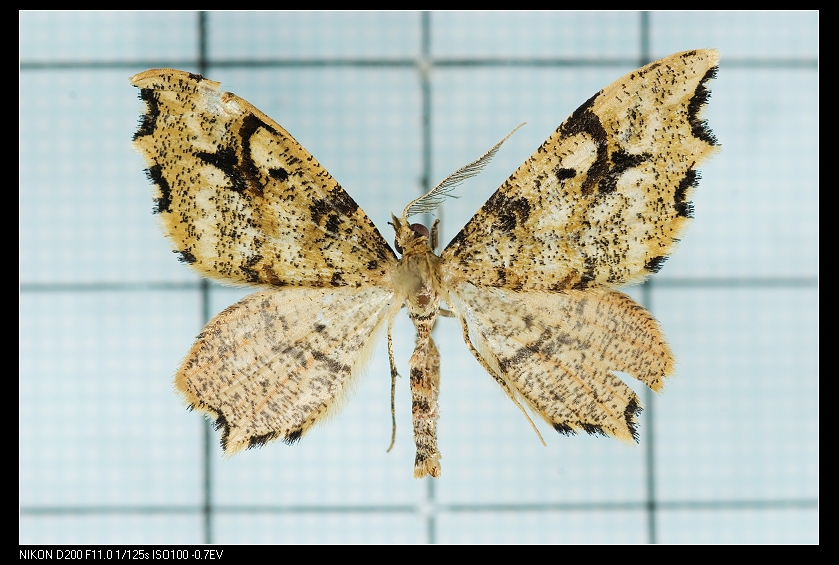

Scientific classification
- Kingdom: Animalia
- Phylum: Arthropoda
- Class: Insecta
- Order: Lepidoptera
- Family: Geometridae
- Genus: Lobogonia
- Species: L. aculeata

Binomial name
- Lobogonia aculeata Wileman, 1911

= Lobogonia aculeata =

Species of moth

Lobogonia aculeata is a moth of the family Geometridae. It is found in Taiwan.

The wingspan 20–24 mm.
