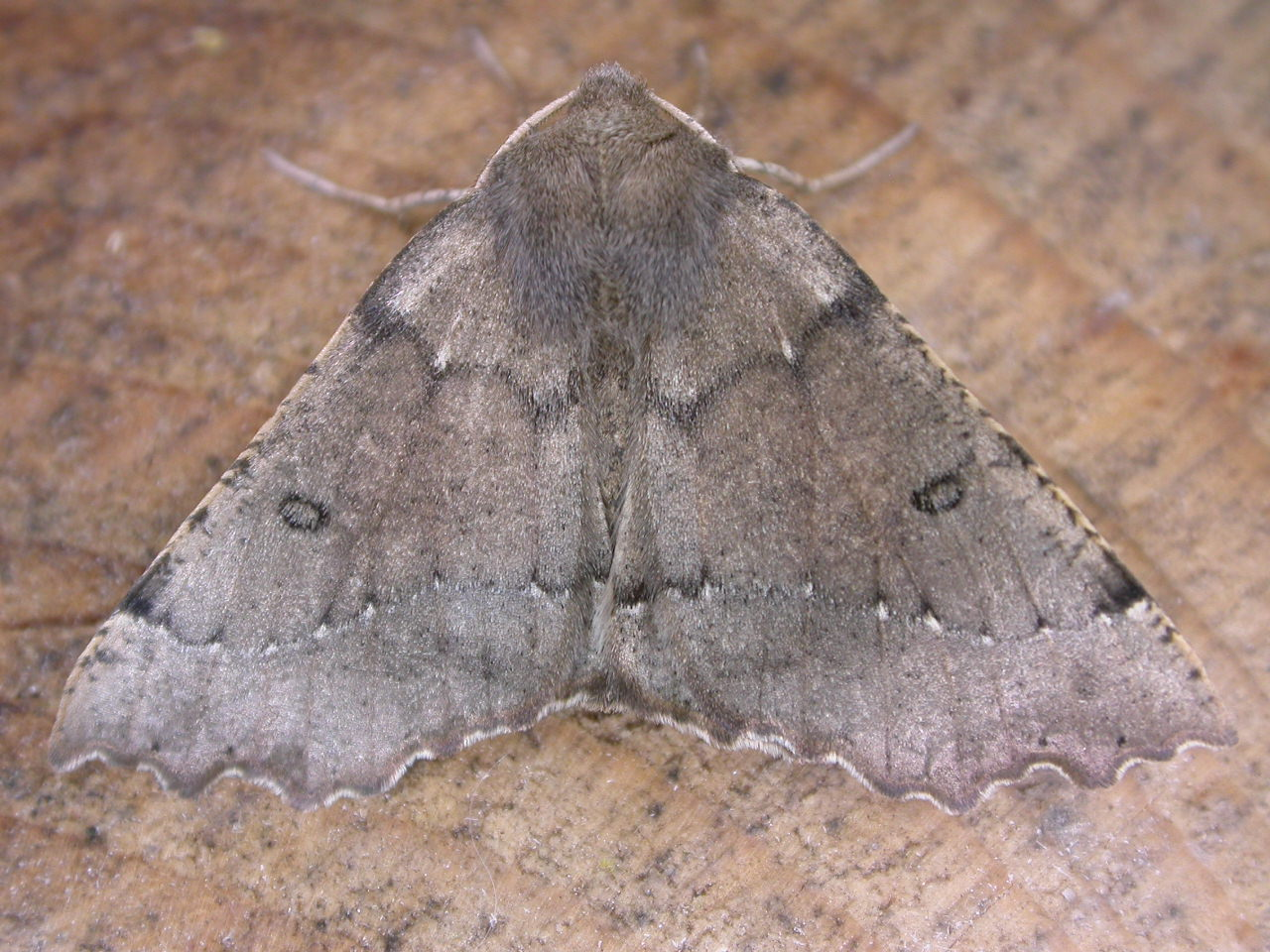

Scientific classification
- Domain: Eukaryota
- Kingdom: Animalia
- Phylum: Arthropoda
- Class: Insecta
- Order: Lepidoptera
- Family: Geometridae
- Genus: Odontopera
- Species: O. bidentata

Binomial name
- Odontopera bidentata (Clerck, 1759)

Synonyms
- Phalaena bidentata Clerck, 1759; Geometra pectinaria Denis & Schiffermuller, 1775; Odontopera pectinaria (Denis & Schiffermuller, 1775); Odontopera dentaria (Hübner, [1799]); Gonodontis oreas Herbulot, 1963; Gonodontis graecarius Bang-Haas, 1910; Odontopera graecarius (Bang-Haas, 1910)

= Scalloped hazel =

Species of moth

The scalloped hazel (Odontopera bidentata) is a moth of the family Geometridae. The species was first described by Carl Alexander Clerck in 1759.

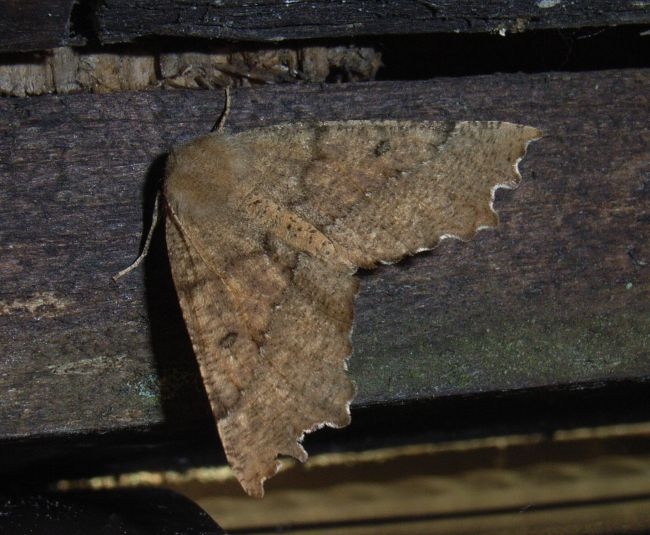

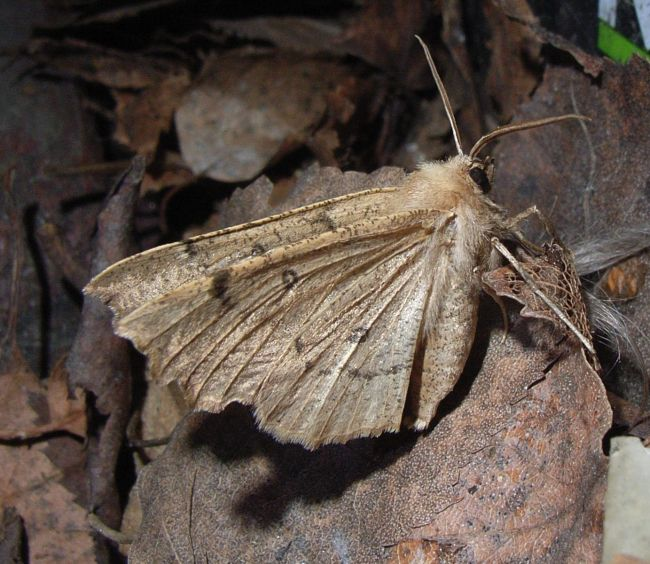

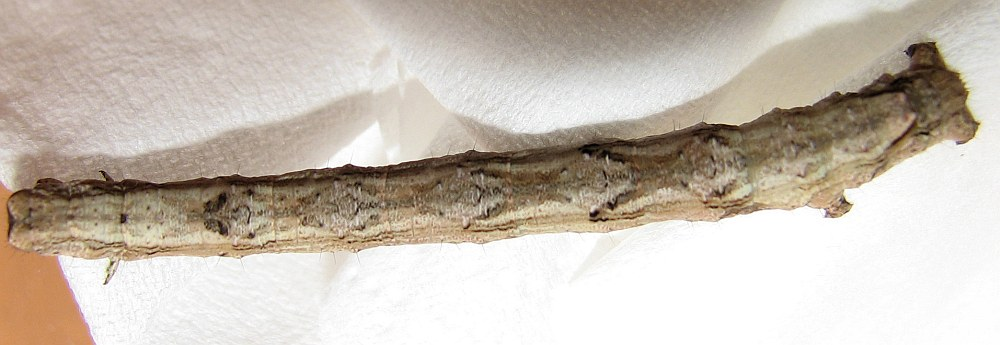
Caterpillar

== Distribution ==
It is a common species of northern and central Europe including the British Isles and Russia to the Urals. It is also widespread through Siberia and the Amur-Ussuri region to the Kuril Islands and Japan.

== Description ==
The wingspan is 46–50 mm. The forewing ground colour is usually grey brown. The same coloured midfield is bordered by blackish crossbars that are often partly white. At the wing edge below the apex are two characteristic, protruding teeth. The scientific name of the species is derived from the Latin language bi = "twice" and dentatus = "toothed". The outer dark crossline of the forewings continues on the hindwings. All wings have a ring-shaped dark discal spots. The thorax is hairy. This is a very variable species with the wing colour ranging from whitish through buff and brown to black, sometimes with variegation, but it is always easily identifiable by the white discal spot on each wing and the characteristic "ragged" margin of the wings. Last instar caterpillars have a brownish colouration. However, other colour variations may also occur. Characteristic are two small humps on the penultimate segment as well as two dark, capsule-like protrusions on the head.

The adults fly at night in May and June and are attracted to light.

The caterpillar is green or brown and twig like, and feeds on a variety of plants (see list below). The species overwinters as a pupa.

1. The flight season refers to the British Isles. This may vary in other parts of the range.

== Biology ==
Habitats include deciduous and mixed woodland, bog forests and parklands.

== Larval food plants ==
- Alnus – grey alder
- Arctium – burdock
- Artemisia – mugwort
- Betula – birch
- Cirsium – creeping thistle
- Crataegus – hawthorn
- Fraxinus – European ash
- Hedera – ivy
- Larix – larch
- Ligustrum – privet
- Malus – apple
- Picea – Norway spruce
- Pinus – Scots pine
- Populus – poplar
- Prunus – bird cherry
- Quercus – oak
- Rhododendron
- Ribes – currant
- Salix – willow
- Sorbus – rowan
- Tilia – lime
- Trifolium – red clover
- Vaccinium – bilberry

== Subspecies ==
- Odontopera bidentata bidentata (Clerck, 1759) (Europe)
- Odontopera bidentata exsul Tschetverikov, 1904 (eastern Asia)
- Odontopera bidentata kurilana Bryk, 1942 (the Kuriles)
