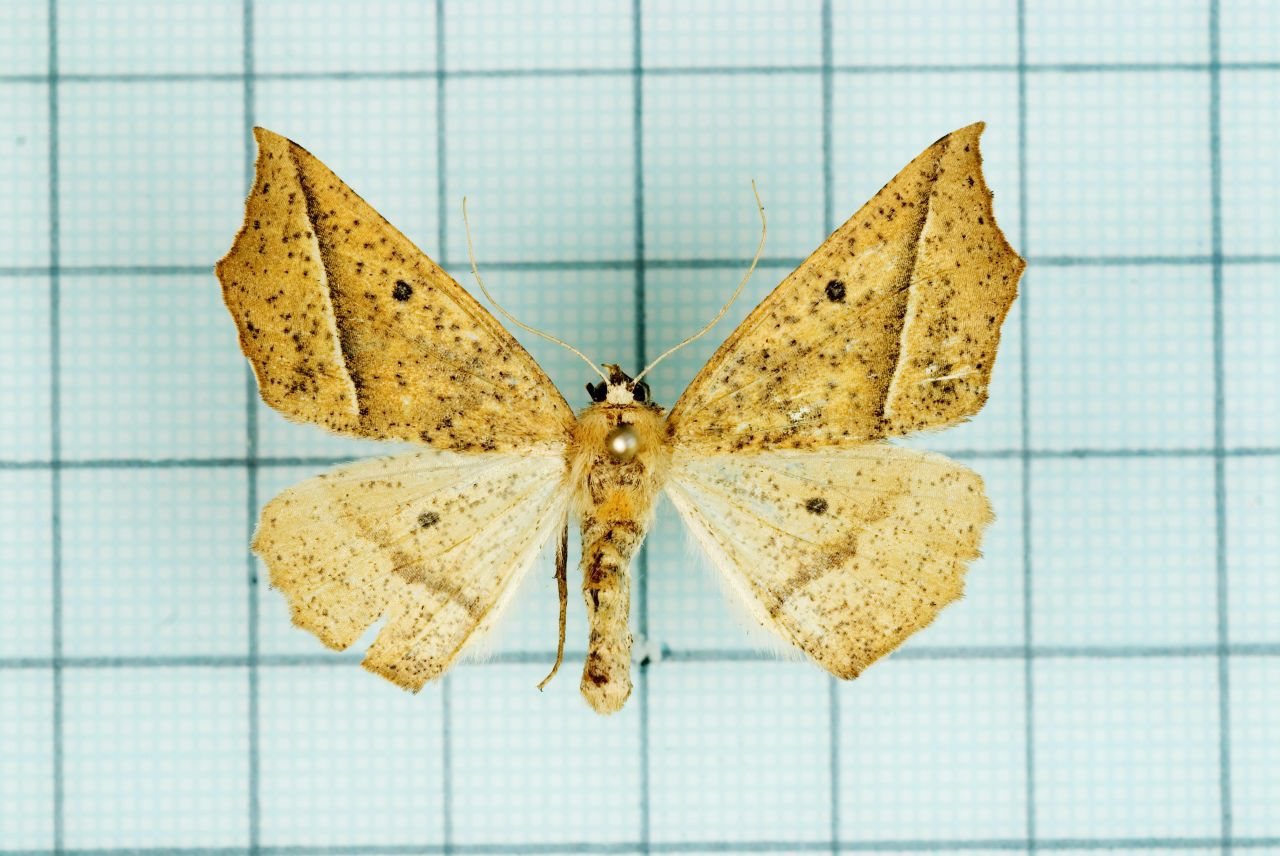
- Male
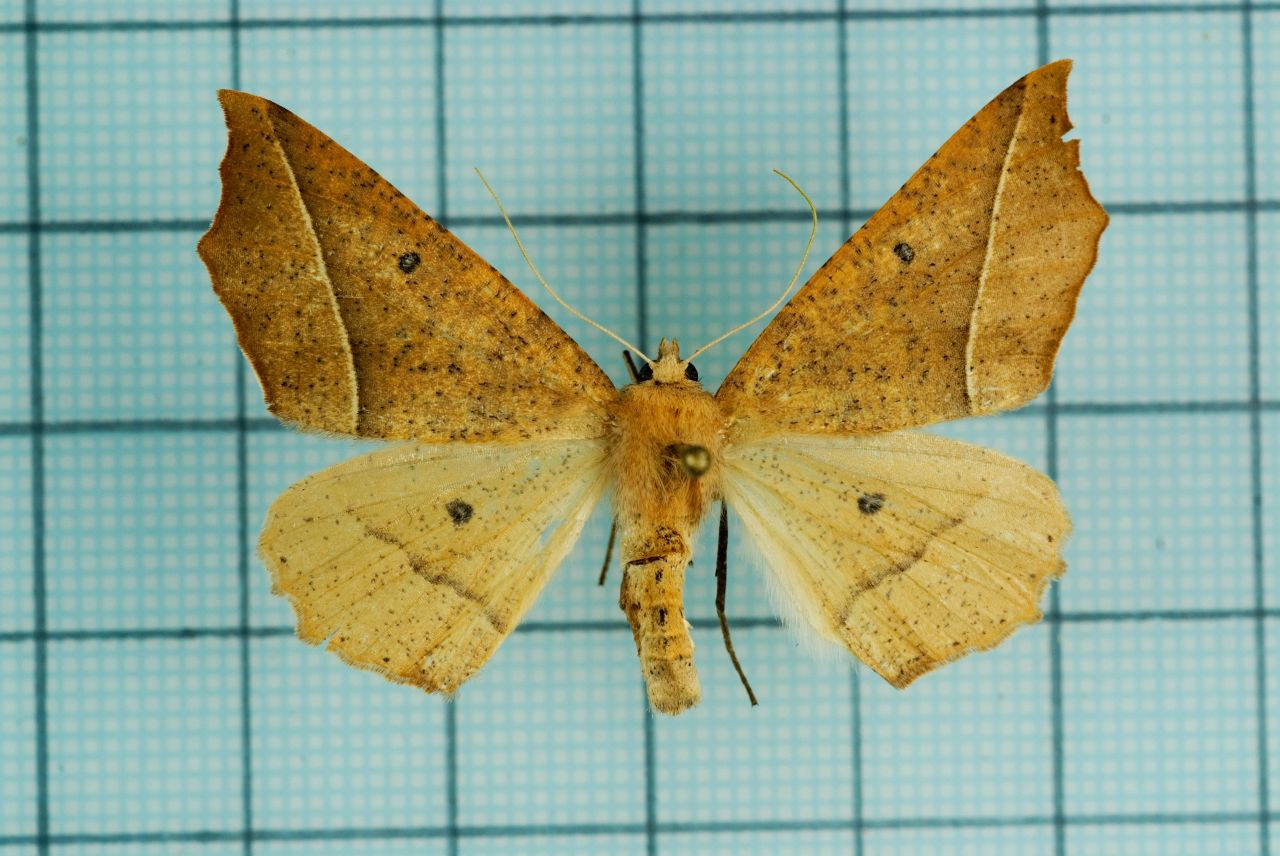
- Female

Scientific classification
- Domain: Eukaryota
- Kingdom: Animalia
- Phylum: Arthropoda
- Class: Insecta
- Order: Lepidoptera
- Family: Geometridae
- Genus: Odontopera
- Species: O. albiguttulata

Binomial name
- Odontopera albiguttulata Bastelberger, 1909

= Odontopera albiguttulata =

Species of moth

Odontopera albiguttulata is a moth of the family Geometridae first described by Max Bastelberger in 1909. It is found in Taiwan.

The wingspan is 39–44 mm.
