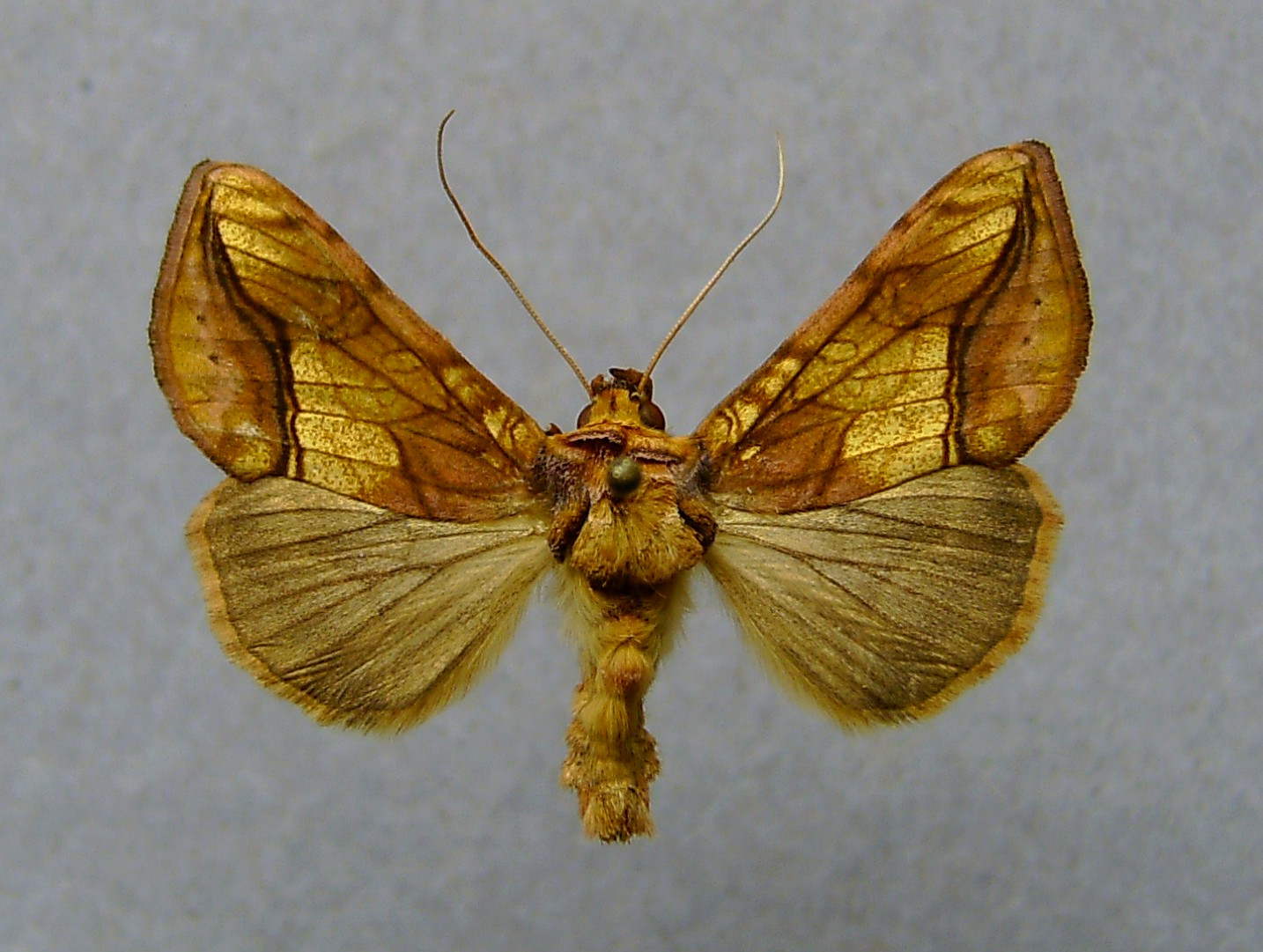

Scientific classification
- Domain: Eukaryota
- Kingdom: Animalia
- Phylum: Arthropoda
- Class: Insecta
- Order: Lepidoptera
- Superfamily: Noctuoidea
- Family: Noctuidae
- Subfamily: Plusiinae
- Tribe: Plusiini
- Subtribe: Euchalciina
- Genus: Panchrysia
- Species: P. aurea

Binomial name
- Panchrysia aurea (Hübner, 1803)

Synonyms
- Noctua aurea Hubner, 1803; Noctua deaurata Esper, 1787 (nec. Goeze, 1781); Panchrysia deaurata (Esper, 1787); Plusia semiargentea Alpheraky, 1889

= Panchrysia aurea =

Species of moth

Panchrysia aurea is a moth of the family Noctuidae. It is found in southern Europe and western and central Asia. The range extends from Portugal, east to Tian Shan, the Altai and the north-western Himalayas. In central Europe, it is found in the southern Alps, lower Austria and the mountains on the Balkan Peninsula.

The wingspan is 40–44 mm. There are two generations per year with adults on wing from May to June and from July to September.

The larvae feed on the leaves of Thalictrum species. Full-grown larvae are white. The species overwinters in the larval stage.
