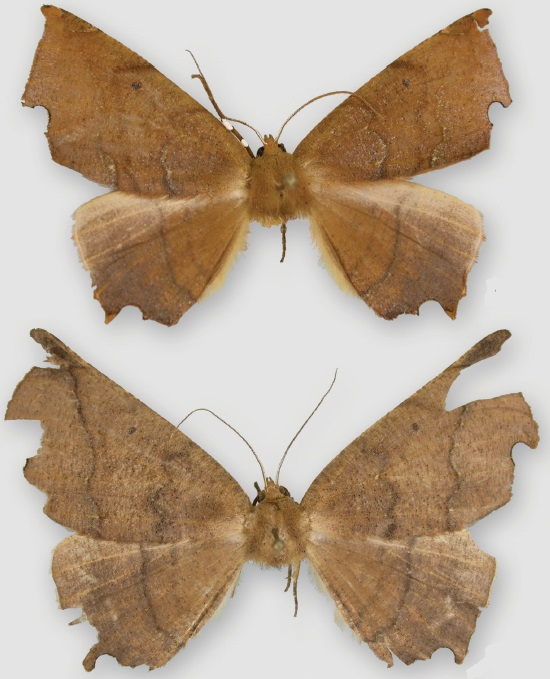

Scientific classification
- Domain: Eukaryota
- Kingdom: Animalia
- Phylum: Arthropoda
- Class: Insecta
- Order: Lepidoptera
- Family: Geometridae
- Genus: Phyllodonta
- Species: P. alajuela

Binomial name
- Phyllodonta alajuela Sullivan, 2014

= Phyllodonta alajuela =

Species of moth

Phyllodonta alajuela is a moth in the family Geometridae first described by J. Bolling Sullivan in 2014. It is found in Costa Rica (Alajuela and Guanacaste provinces), possibly extending into Nicaragua. It has been recorded from altitudes between 500 and 1,150 meters.

The length of the forewings is 23.5–25 mm for males and 27 mm for females. The forewings are warm brown with prominent undulating antemedial and postmedial lines. Both lines are black edged with lighter grayish scales proximally. There is black scaling distal to the reniform at the costa, forming a diffuse line parallel to the antemedial line. The reniform spot is small and black and forms a center of a gray circle. The hindwings have a prominent postmedial line and a margin with a submedial notch. Adults are probably on wing year round.

The larvae feed on Witheringia solanacea and Brugmansia × candida.

== Etymology ==
The species is named for the province where the holotype and paratypes were taken.
