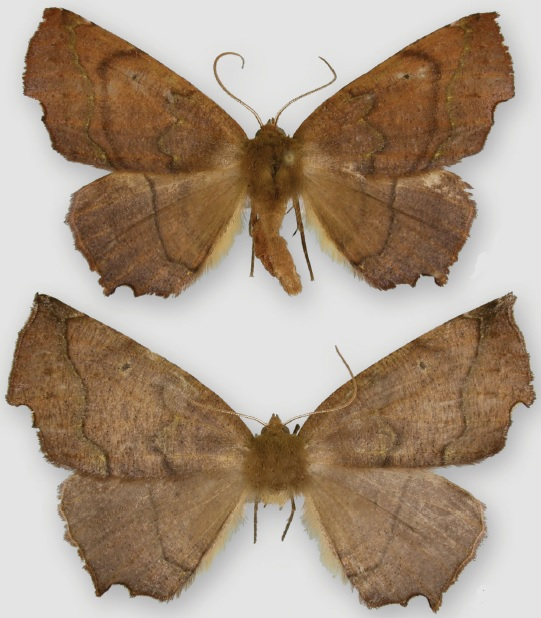

Scientific classification
- Domain: Eukaryota
- Kingdom: Animalia
- Phylum: Arthropoda
- Class: Insecta
- Order: Lepidoptera
- Family: Geometridae
- Genus: Phyllodonta
- Species: P. esperanza

Binomial name
- Phyllodonta esperanza Sullivan, 2014

= Phyllodonta esperanza =

Species of moth

Phyllodonta esperanza is a moth in the family Geometridae first described by J. Bolling Sullivan in 2014. It is found in the Talamancas and Central Volcanic and Tilarán ranges in Costa Rica, possibly extending into the other Costa Rican mountain ranges and northern Panama. It has been collected at elevations above 1,200 meters.

The length of the forewings is 20–26 mm for males and 25–27 mm for females. The forewings are warm brown with prominent undulating antemedial and postmedial lines. Both lines are black edged with lighter grayish scales proximally. There is black scaling distal to the reniform spot at the costa, forming a diffuse line parallel to the antemedial line. The reniform spot is small, black and forms a center of a gray circle. The hindwings have a prominent postmedial line, the margin with a submedial notch. Adults are on wing year round.

== Etymology ==
The species is named for the biological station La Esperanza in the Talamanca Mountains, Cartago, Costa Rica, where many of the specimens were taken.
