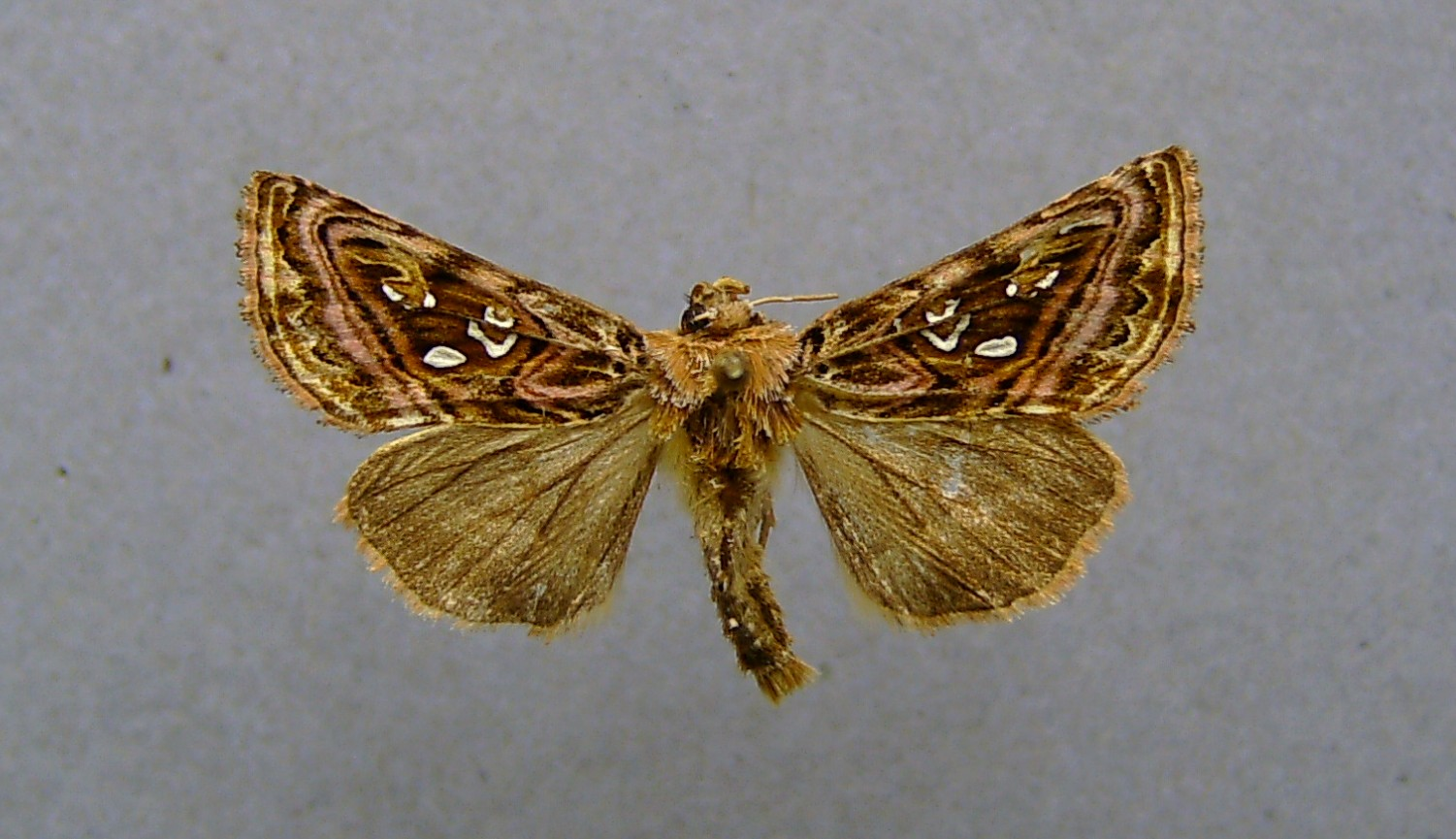
- Panchrysia v-argenteum

Scientific classification
- Kingdom: Animalia
- Phylum: Arthropoda
- Clade: Pancrustacea
- Class: Insecta
- Order: Lepidoptera
- Superfamily: Noctuoidea
- Family: Noctuidae
- Subtribe: Euchalciina
- Genus: Panchrysia; Hübner, [1821]

Synonyms
- Hexaureia Beck, 1991; Tetrargentia Beck, 1991

= Panchrysia =

Genus of moths

Panchrysia is a genus of moths of the family Noctuidae.

== Species ==
- Panchrysia aurea (Hübner, 1803)
- Panchrysia dives Eversmann, 1844
- Panchrysia ornata Bremer, 1864
- Panchrysia tibetensis Chou & Lu, 1982
- Panchrysia v-argenteum Esper, 1794
