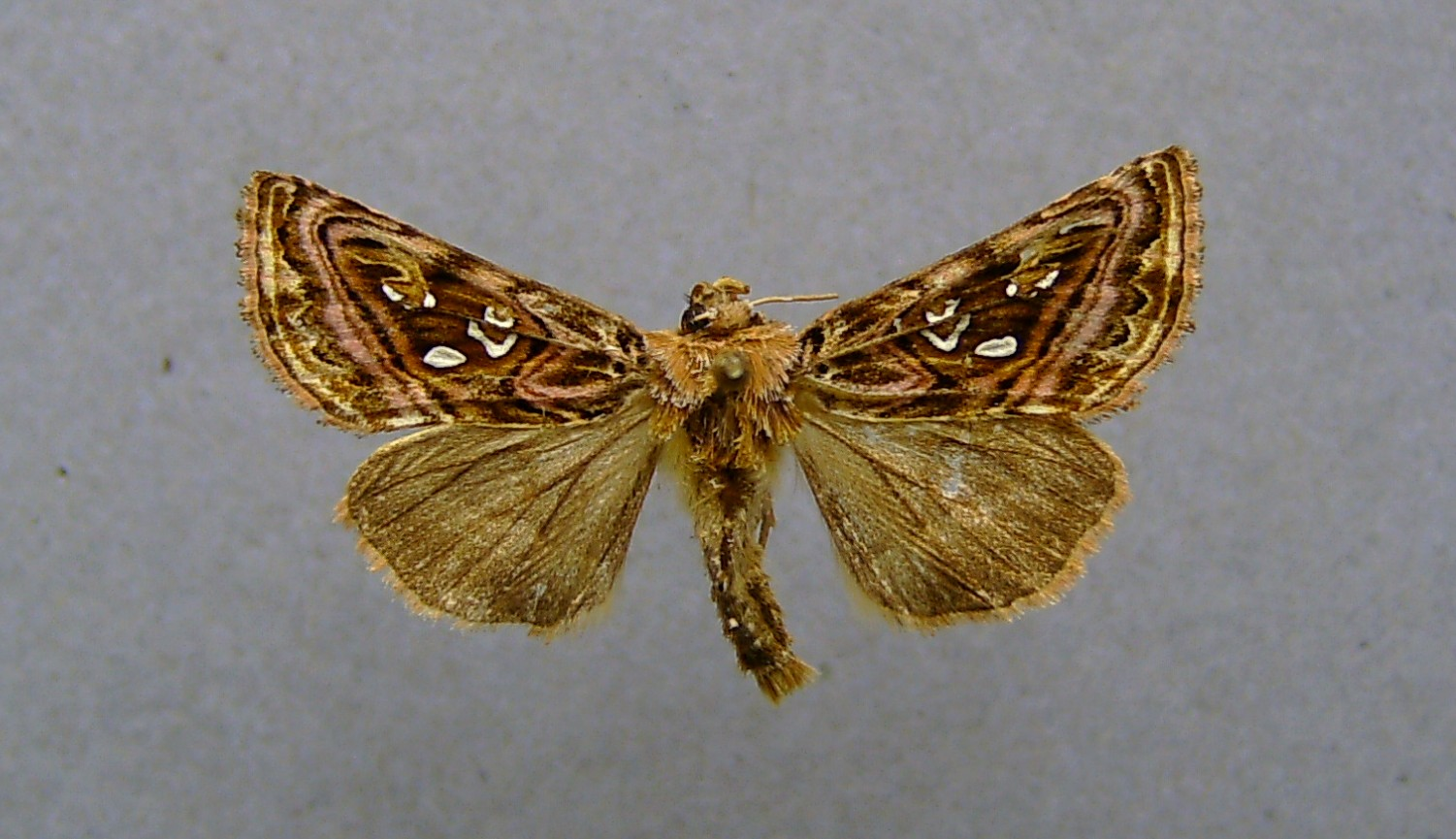

Scientific classification
- Domain: Eukaryota
- Kingdom: Animalia
- Phylum: Arthropoda
- Class: Insecta
- Order: Lepidoptera
- Superfamily: Noctuoidea
- Family: Noctuidae
- Genus: Panchrysia
- Species: P. v-argenteum

Binomial name
- Panchrysia v-argenteum (Esper, 1798)

Synonyms
- Phalaena v-argenteum

= Panchrysia v-argenteum =

Species of moth

Panchrysia v-argenteum is a moth of the family Noctuidae. It is found in the Carpathian Mountains, Dalmatia, the Alps and Greece. The species is found high altitudes of up to 1,400 meters.

The wingspan is 36–44 mm. The moth flies from May to September depending on the location.

The larvae feed on the leaves of a wide range of plants, including Thalictrum and Isopyrum thalictroides.

== Subpspecies ==
There are two recognised subspecies:

- Panchrysia v-argenteum v-argenteum (Alps)
- Panchrysia v-argenteum pantheon (Greece)
