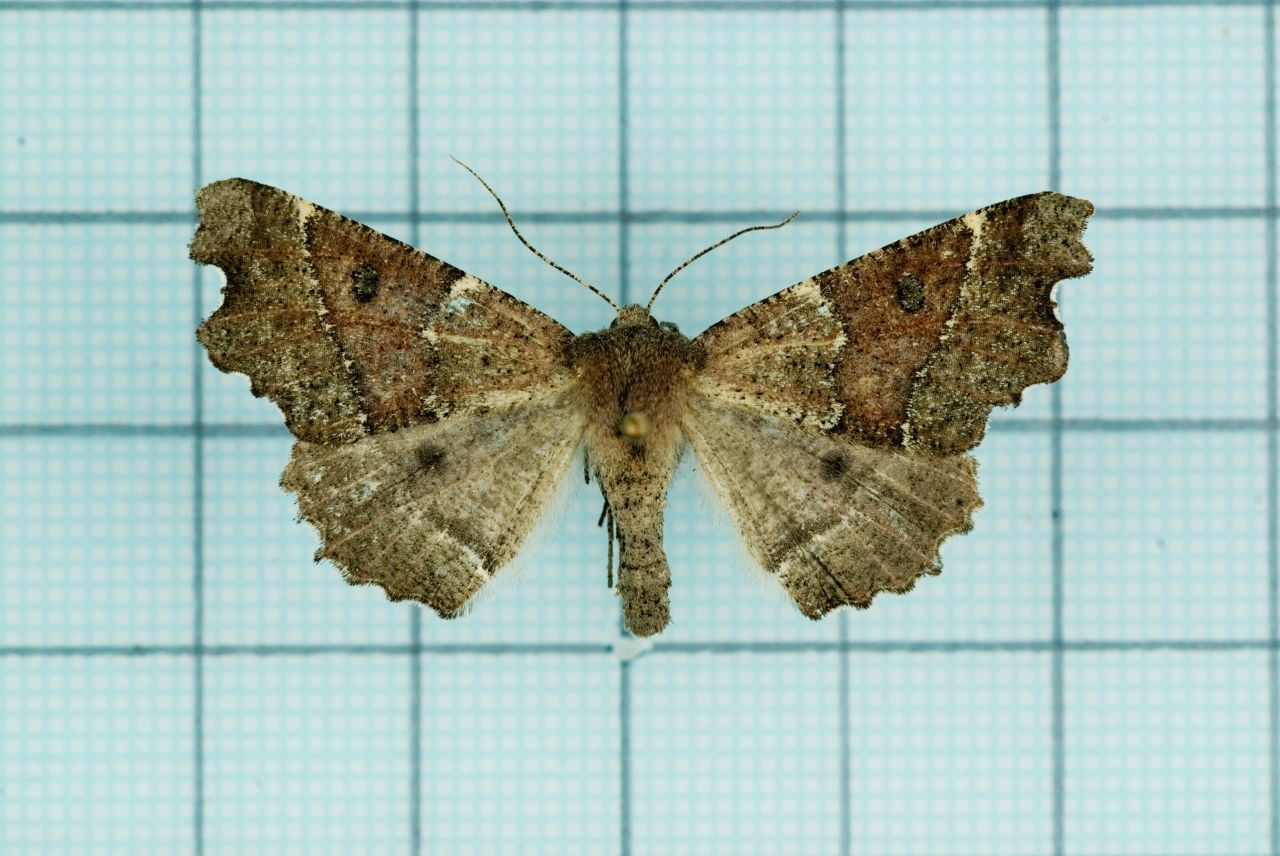
- Female
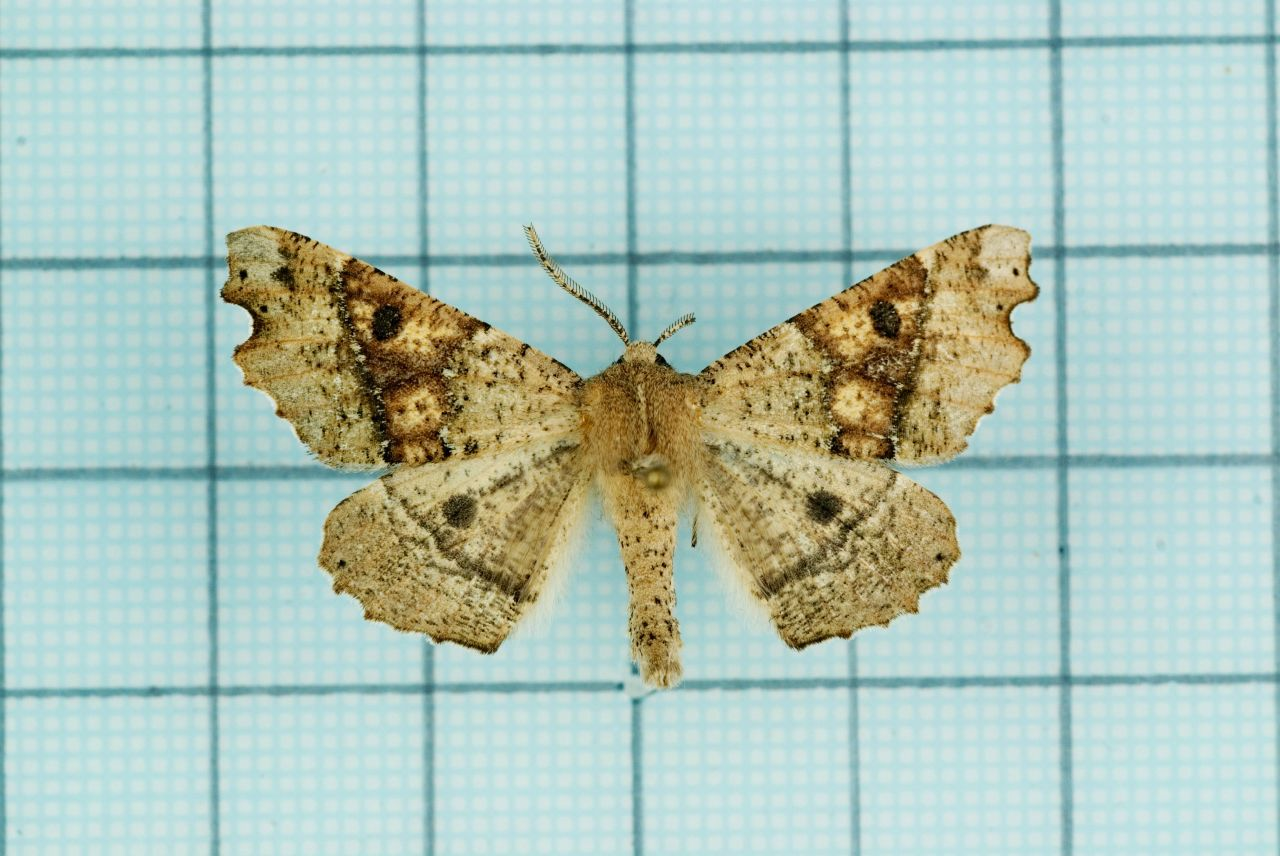
- Male

Scientific classification
- Domain: Eukaryota
- Kingdom: Animalia
- Phylum: Arthropoda
- Class: Insecta
- Order: Lepidoptera
- Family: Geometridae
- Genus: Odontopera
- Species: O. insulata

Binomial name
- Odontopera insulata Bastelberger, 1909

Synonyms
- Gonodontis variegata Wileman, 1910; Gonodontis tsekua Wehrli, 1931

= Odontopera insulata =

Species of moth

Odontopera insulata is a moth of the family Geometridae first described by Max Bastelberger in 1909. It is found in Taiwan.

The wingspan is about 38 mm.

== Subspecies ==
- Odontopera insulata insulata
- Odontopera insulata tsekua (Wehrli, 1931)
