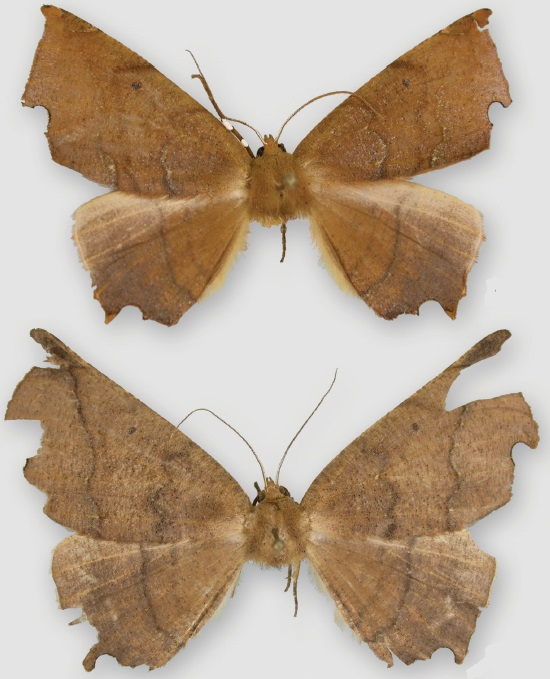
- Phyllodonta alajuela

Scientific classification
- Domain: Eukaryota
- Kingdom: Animalia
- Phylum: Arthropoda
- Class: Insecta
- Order: Lepidoptera
- Family: Geometridae
- Tribe: Ourapterygini
- Genus: Phyllodonta; Warren, 1894

Synonyms
- Lobopalta Warren 1894

= Phyllodonta =

Genus of moths

Phyllodonta is a genus of moths in the family Geometridae described by Warren in 1894.

== Species ==
- Phyllodonta alajuela Sullivan, 2014
- Phyllodonta anca Dognin, 1901
- Phyllodonta angulosa (Stoll, 1781)
- Phyllodonta caninata (Guenée, 1857)
- Phyllodonta cataphracta Prout, 1931
- Phyllodonta decisaria (Herrich-Schäffer, 1870)
- Phyllodonta druciata Schaus, 1901
- Phyllodonta esperanza Sullivan, 2014
- Phyllodonta flabellaria (Thierry-Mieg, 1894)
- Phyllodonta flexilinea (Warren, 1904)
- Phyllodonta furcata Warren, 1894
- Phyllodonta indeterminata Schaus, 1901
- Phyllodonta inexcisa Dognin, 1908
- Phyllodonta informis Warren, 1894
- Phyllodonta intermediata Sullivan, 2014
- Phyllodonta latrata (Guenée, 1857)
- Phyllodonta matalia (Druce, 1891)
- Phyllodonta muscilinea Dognin, 1911
- Phyllodonta obscura Dognin, 1904
- Phyllodonta peccataria (Barnes & McDunnough, 1916)
- Phyllodonta sarukhani Beutelspacher, 1984
- Phyllodonta semicava Warren, 1904
- Phyllodonta songaria Dognin, 1901
- Phyllodonta succedens (Walker, 1860)
- Phyllodonta timareta (Druce, 1898)
- Phyllodonta ustanalis Warren, 1897
- Phyllodonta vivida Warren, 1904
