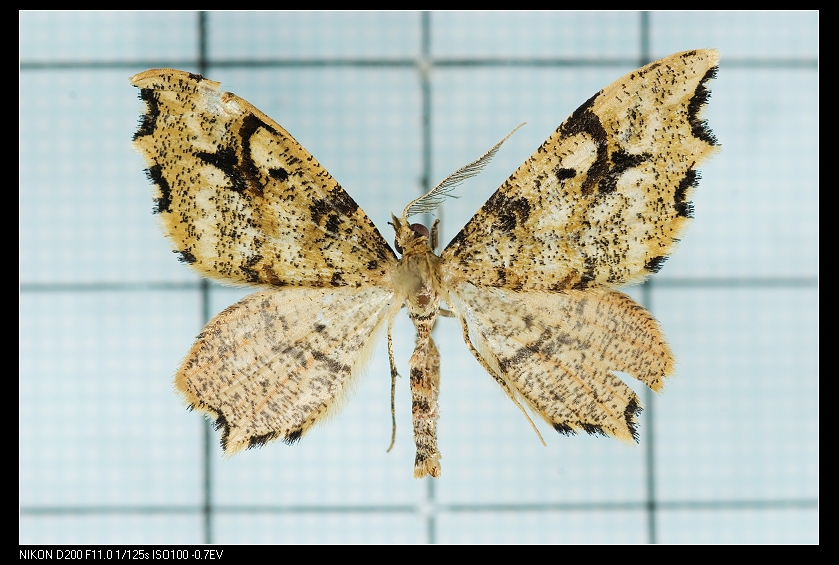
- Lobogonia aculeata

Scientific classification
- Kingdom: Animalia
- Phylum: Arthropoda
- Class: Insecta
- Order: Lepidoptera
- Family: Geometridae
- Subfamily: Larentiinae
- Genus: Lobogonia; Warren, 1893

= Lobogonia =

Genus of moths

Lobogonia is a genus of moths in the family Geometridae described by Warren in 1893.

== Species ==
- Lobogonia aculeata Wileman, 1911
- Lobogonia ambusta Warren, 1893
- Lobogonia conspicuaria Leech, 1897
- Lobogonia formosana (Bastelberger, 1909)
- Lobogonia olivata Warren, 1896
- Lobogonia pallida (Warren, 1894)
- Lobogonia parallelaria Leech, 1897
- Lobogonia pseudomacariata (Poujade, 1895)
- Lobogonia salvata Prout, 1928
