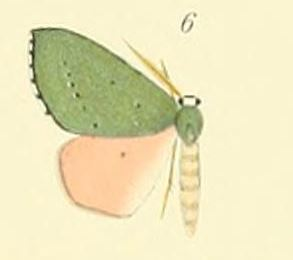
- Lasiochlora bicolor

Scientific classification
- Kingdom: Animalia
- Phylum: Arthropoda
- Class: Insecta
- Order: Lepidoptera
- Family: Geometridae
- Subfamily: Geometrinae
- Genus: Lasiochlora; Warren, 1894

= Lasiochlora =

Genus of moths

Lasiochlora is a genus of moths in the family Geometridae described by Warren in 1894.

== Species ==
- Lasiochlora bicolor (Thierry-Mieg, 1907)
- Lasiochlora diducta (Walker, 1861)
