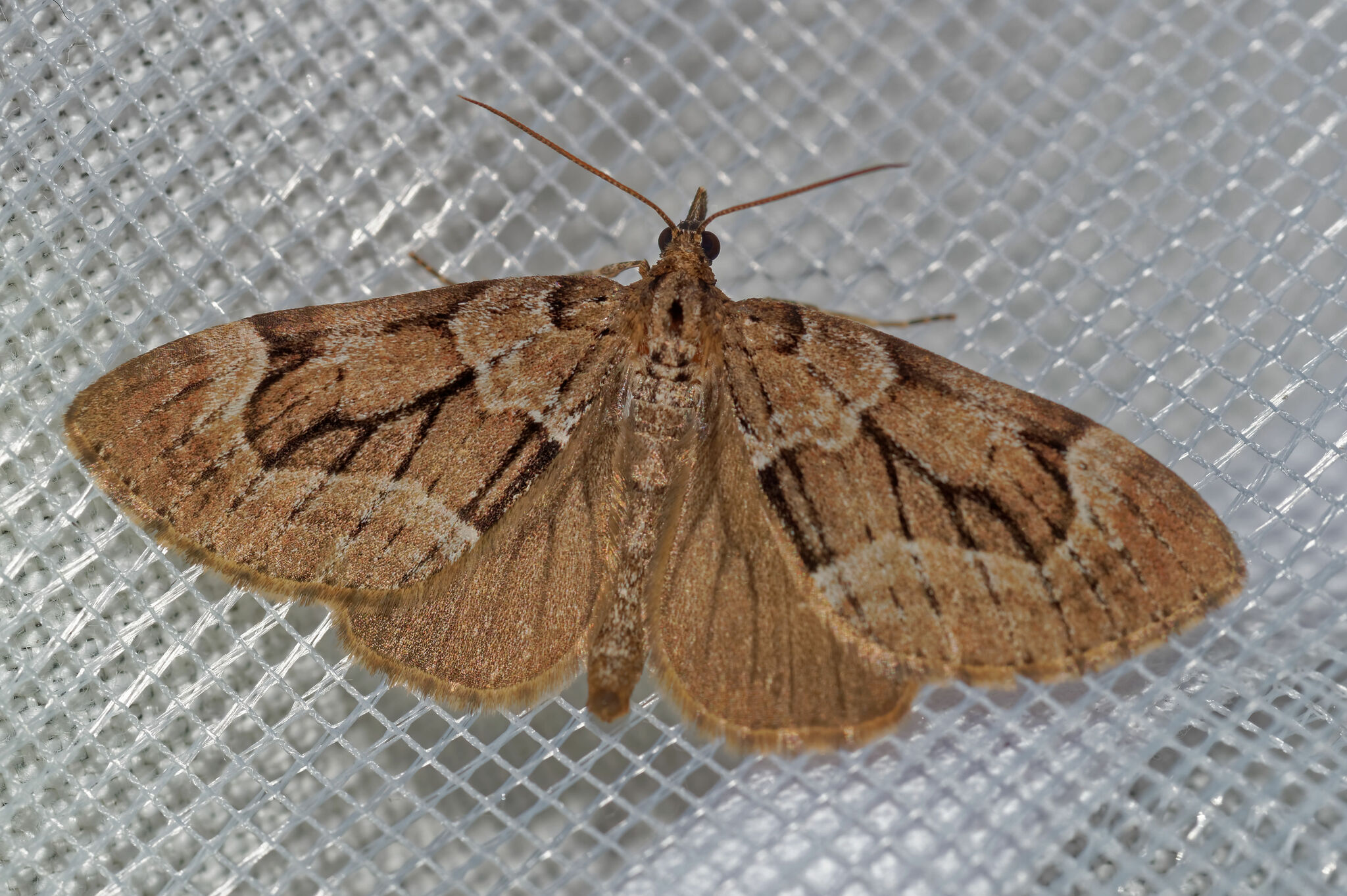
- Lobophorodes sabinata, France

Scientific classification
- Kingdom: Animalia
- Phylum: Arthropoda
- Clade: Pancrustacea
- Class: Insecta
- Order: Lepidoptera
- Family: Geometridae
- Subfamily: Larentiinae
- Genus: Lobophorodes; Hampson, 1903

Synonyms
- Epilobophora Inoue, 1943

= Lobophorodes =

Genus of moths

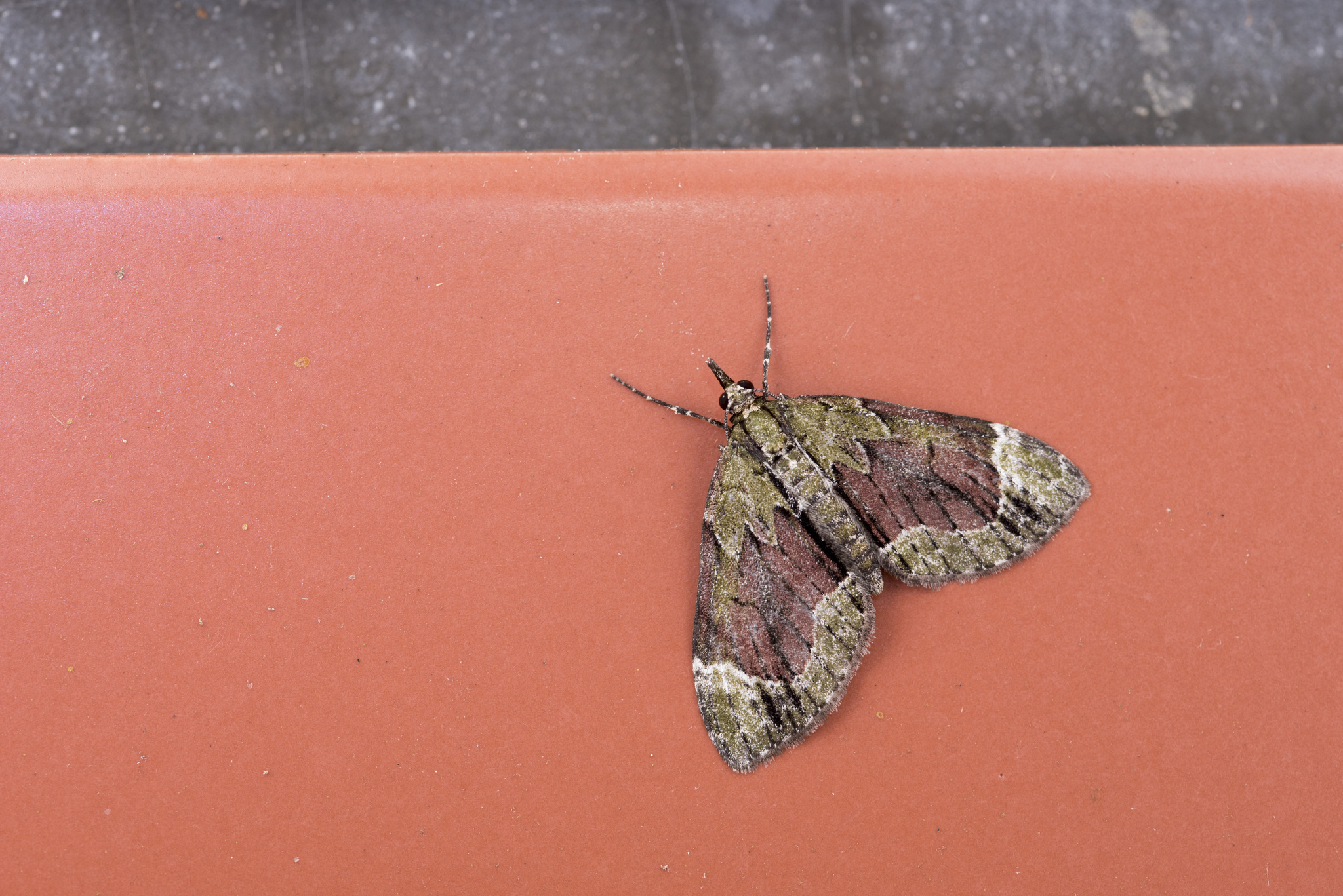
Lobophorodes venipicta, Taiwan

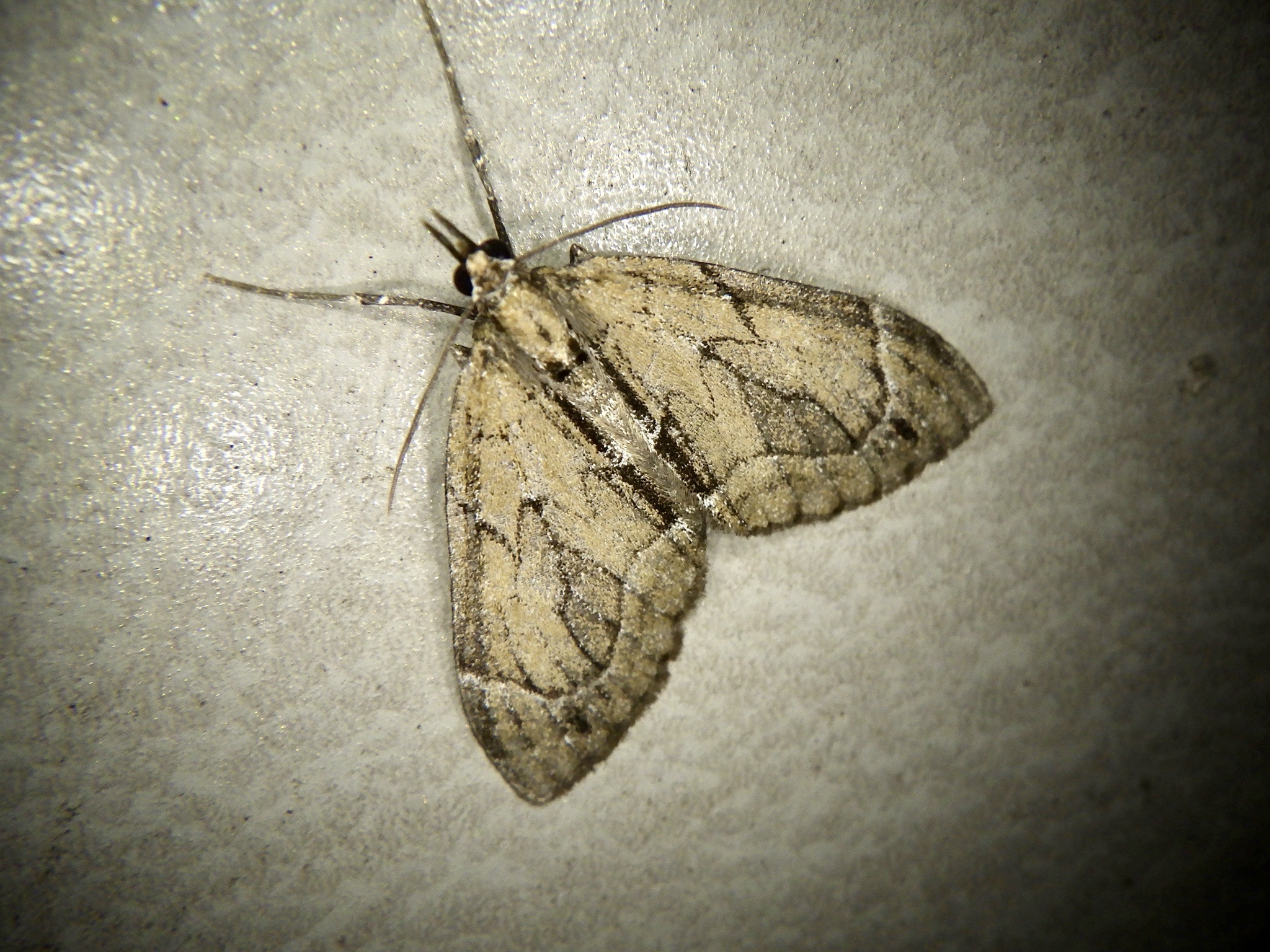
Lobophorodes obscuraria, Japan

Lobophorodes is a genus of geometer moths in the family Geometridae. There are about 17 described species in Lobophorodes, found in Asia and Europe.

== Species ==
These 17 species belong to the genus Lobophorodes:

- Lobophorodes bifasciatus Inoue, 1982
- Lobophorodes depressa (Yazaki & Wang, 2018)
- Lobophorodes florianii (Gianti, 2007)
- Lobophorodes fumosaria (Xue, 1992)
- Lobophorodes infuscata (Yazaki & Wang, 2018)
- Lobophorodes kostjuki (Tikhonov, 1994)
- Lobophorodes miniobscuraria (Xue, 1992)
- Lobophorodes mitis (Xue & Meng, 1995)
- Lobophorodes nishizawai (Yazaki, 1986)
- Lobophorodes obscuraria (Leech, 1891)
- Lobophorodes odontodes Xue, 1999
- Lobophorodes paraobscuraria (Xue, 1999)
- Lobophorodes sabinata (Geyer, [1831])
- Lobophorodes subangulata (Xue, 1992)
- Lobophorodes undulans Hampson, 1903
- Lobophorodes venipicta (Wileman, 1914)
- Lobophorodes vivida (Xue, 1992)
