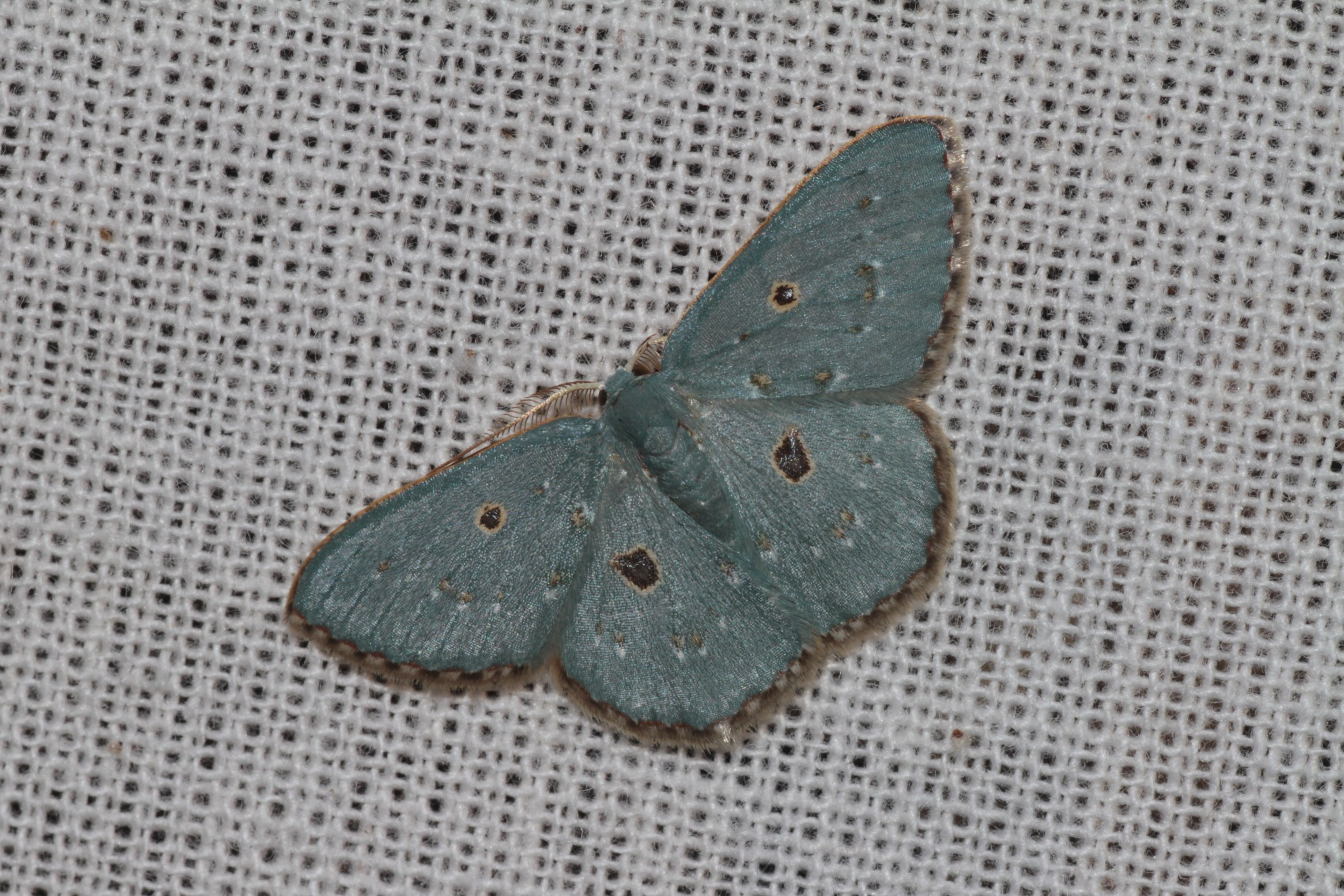
- Lophostola atridisca

Scientific classification
- Kingdom: Animalia
- Phylum: Arthropoda
- Clade: Pancrustacea
- Class: Insecta
- Order: Lepidoptera
- Family: Geometridae
- Genus: Lophostola; Prout, 1912

= Lophostola =

Genus of moths

Lophostola is a genus of moths in the family Geometridae described by Prout in 1912.

Some species of this genus are:

- Lophostola annuligera (Swinhoe, 1909)
- Lophostola atridisca (Warren, 1897)
- Lophostola cara Prout, 1913
