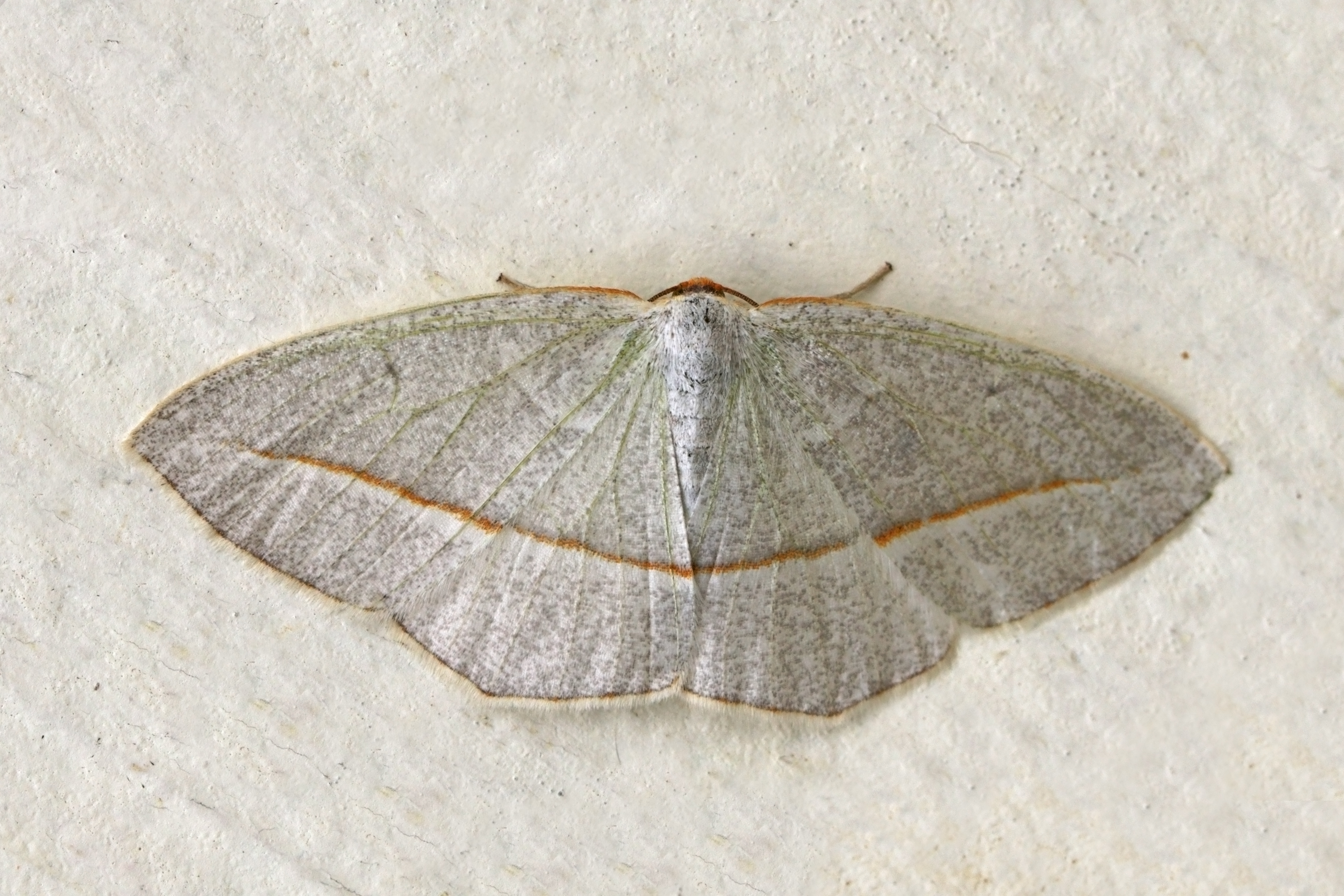
- Leuculopsis unifasciata Mount Totumas cloud forest, Panama

Scientific classification
- Kingdom: Animalia
- Phylum: Arthropoda
- Class: Insecta
- Order: Lepidoptera
- Family: Geometridae
- Genus: Leuculopsis

= Leuculopsis =

Genus of moths

Leuculopsis is a genus of moths in the family Geometridae.
