= Leptocolpia =

Scientific classification
- Kingdom: Animalia
- Phylum: Arthropoda
- Class: Insecta
- Order: Lepidoptera
- Family: Geometridae
- Genus: Leptocolpia

Genus of moths

Leptocolpia is a genus of moth in the family Geometridae.
