= Begumia =

Scientific classification
- Kingdom: Animalia
- Phylum: Arthropoda
- Clade: Pancrustacea
- Class: Insecta
- Order: Lepidoptera
- Family: Geometridae
- Subfamily: Ennominae
- Genus: Begumia; Özdikmen & Seven, 2006

Synonyms
- Scioglyptis Meyrick, 1892 (Preoccupied); Lobus Fletcher, 1979 (Preoccupied)

Genus of moths

Begumia is a genus of moths in the family Geometridae. The genus was described by Özdikmen & Seven, 2006 as a replacement name for Lobus Fletcher, 1979.
