= Lacistophanes =

Scientific classification
- Kingdom: Animalia
- Phylum: Arthropoda
- Clade: Pancrustacea
- Class: Insecta
- Order: Lepidoptera
- Family: Geometridae
- Genus: Lacistophanes; Turner, 1947
- Species: L. hackeri

Binomial name
- Lacistophanes hackeri Turner, 1947

Genus of moths

Lacistophanes is a monotypic moth genus in the family Geometridae. Its only species, Lacistophanes hackeri, is found in the Australian state of Queensland. Both the genus and species were first described by Turner in 1947.

Lepidoptera and Some Other Life Forms and Australian Caterpillars and their Butterflies and Moths put this genus in the family Noctuidae and subfamily Acontiinae.
