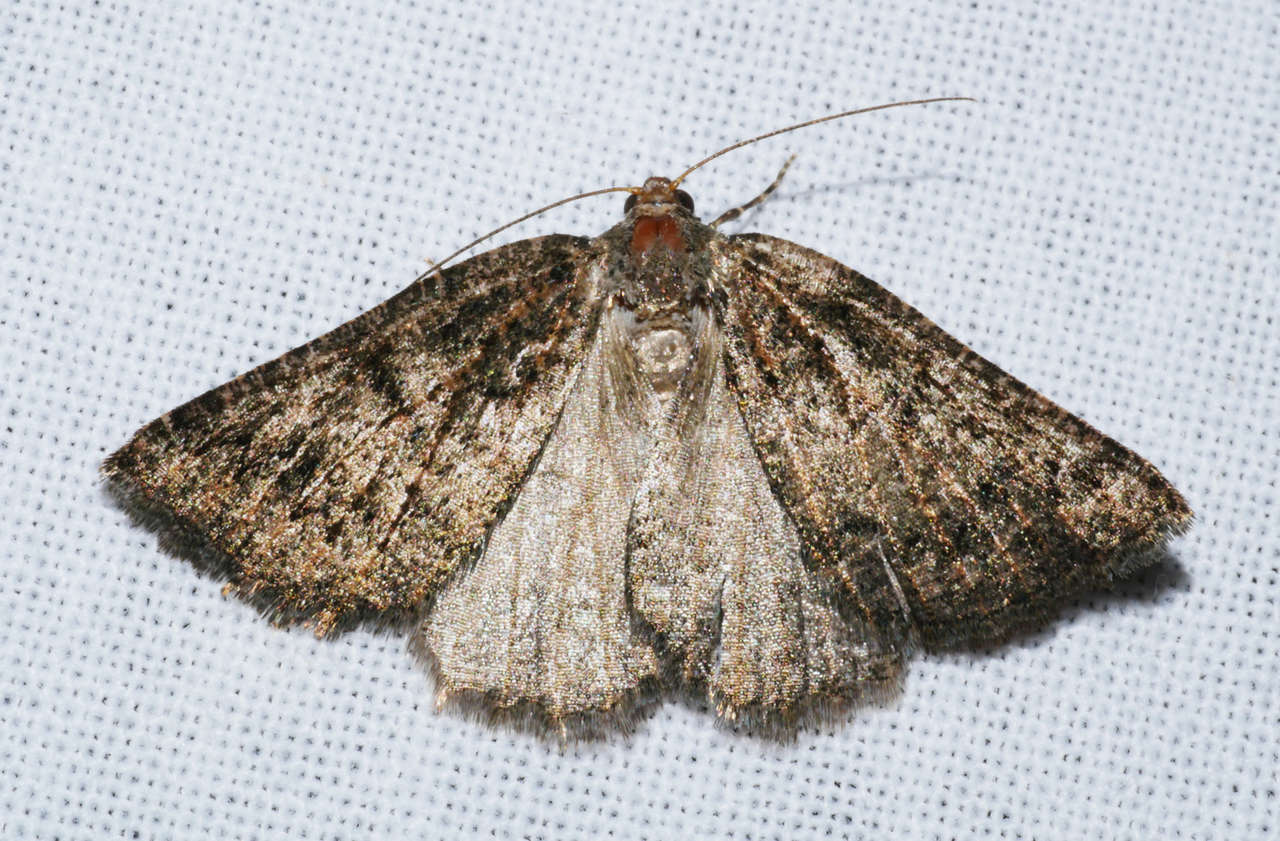
- Lackrana carbo

Scientific classification
- Kingdom: Animalia
- Phylum: Arthropoda
- Class: Insecta
- Order: Lepidoptera
- Family: Geometridae
- Genus: Lackrana; McQuillan, 1996

= Lackrana =

Genus of moths

Lackrana is a genus of moths in the family Geometridae.
