= Lacaria =

Scientific classification
- Kingdom: Animalia
- Phylum: Arthropoda
- Class: Insecta
- Order: Lepidoptera
- Family: Geometridae
- Genus: Lacaria; Orfila & Schajovski, 1959

Genus of moths

Lacaria is a genus of moth in the family Geometridae. They occur in South America (Chile, Argentina).

== Description ==
The forewings are brown or grey, with paler patches or mottling, and with wavy transverse lines that can be indistinct. The hindwings are whitish buff with two indistinct dark streaks near tornus.

== Species ==
There are seven recognized species:

- Lacaria aczeli Orfila & Schajovski, [1960]
- Lacaria araucanaria Orfila & Schajovski, [1960]
- Lacaria phasma (Butler, 1882)
- Lacaria orfilai Rindge, 1986
- Lacaria picuncharia Orfila & Schajovski, 1960
- Lacaria schachovskoyi (Sperry, 1954)
- Lacaria sperryi Orfila & Schajovski, [1960]
