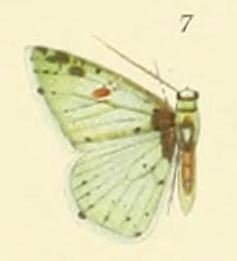
- Lissochlora rufipicta

Scientific classification
- Kingdom: Animalia
- Phylum: Arthropoda
- Class: Insecta
- Order: Lepidoptera
- Family: Geometridae
- Genus: Lissochlora; Warren, 1900

= Lissochlora =

Genus of moths

Lissochlora is a genus of moths in the family Geometridae described by Warren in 1900.

== Species ==
- Lissochlora albociliaria Herrich-Schäffer, [1855]
- Lissochlora alboseriata Warren, 1900
- Lissochlora bryata Felder & Rogenhofer, 1875
- Lissochlora calida Dognin, 1898
- Lissochlora cecilia Prout, 1912
- Lissochlora daniloi Pitkin, 1993
- Lissochlora diarita Dognin, 1898
- Lissochlora discipuncta Warren, 1900
- Lissochlora eugethes Prout, 1912
- Lissochlora freddyi Pitkin, 1993
- Lissochlora hena Dognin, 1898
- Lissochlora hoffmannsi Prout, 1932
- Lissochlora inconspicua Bastelberger, 1911
- Lissochlora jenna Dognin, 1898
  - Lissochlora jenna ssp. salubris Prout, 1932
- Lissochlora jocularia Dognin, 1923
- Lissochlora latuta Dognin, 1898
- Lissochlora licada Dognin, 1898
- Lissochlora liriata Dognin, 1898
- Lissochlora manostigma Dyar, 1912
- Lissochlora molliculata Warren, 1904
- Lissochlora mollissima Dognin, 1892
- Lissochlora monospilonota Prout, 1916
- Lissochlora multiseriata Dognin, 1923
- Lissochlora nigricornis Warren, 1907
- Lissochlora nigripes Dognin, 1911
- Lissochlora nortia Druce, 1892
- Lissochlora paegnia Prout, 1932
- Lissochlora pasama Dognin, 1898
- Lissochlora pectinifera Prout, 1916
- Lissochlora punctiseriata Dognin, 1910
- Lissochlora purpureotincta Warren, 1900
- Lissochlora quotidiana Prout, 1932
- Lissochlora rhodonota Prout, 1916
- Lissochlora ronaldi Pitkin, 1993
- Lissochlora vividata Prout, 1932
- Lissochlora viridilinea Prout, 1916
  - Lissochlora viridilinea ssp. cushiensis Prout, 1932
- Lissochlora viridifimbria Dognin, 1911
- Lissochlora venilineata Warren, 1907
- Lissochlora stacta Prout, 1932
- Lissochlora sanguinipunctata Dognin, 1906
- Lissochlora rufoseriata Prout, 1917
- Lissochlora rufipicta Prout, 1910
- Lissochlora rufiguttata Warren, 1900
