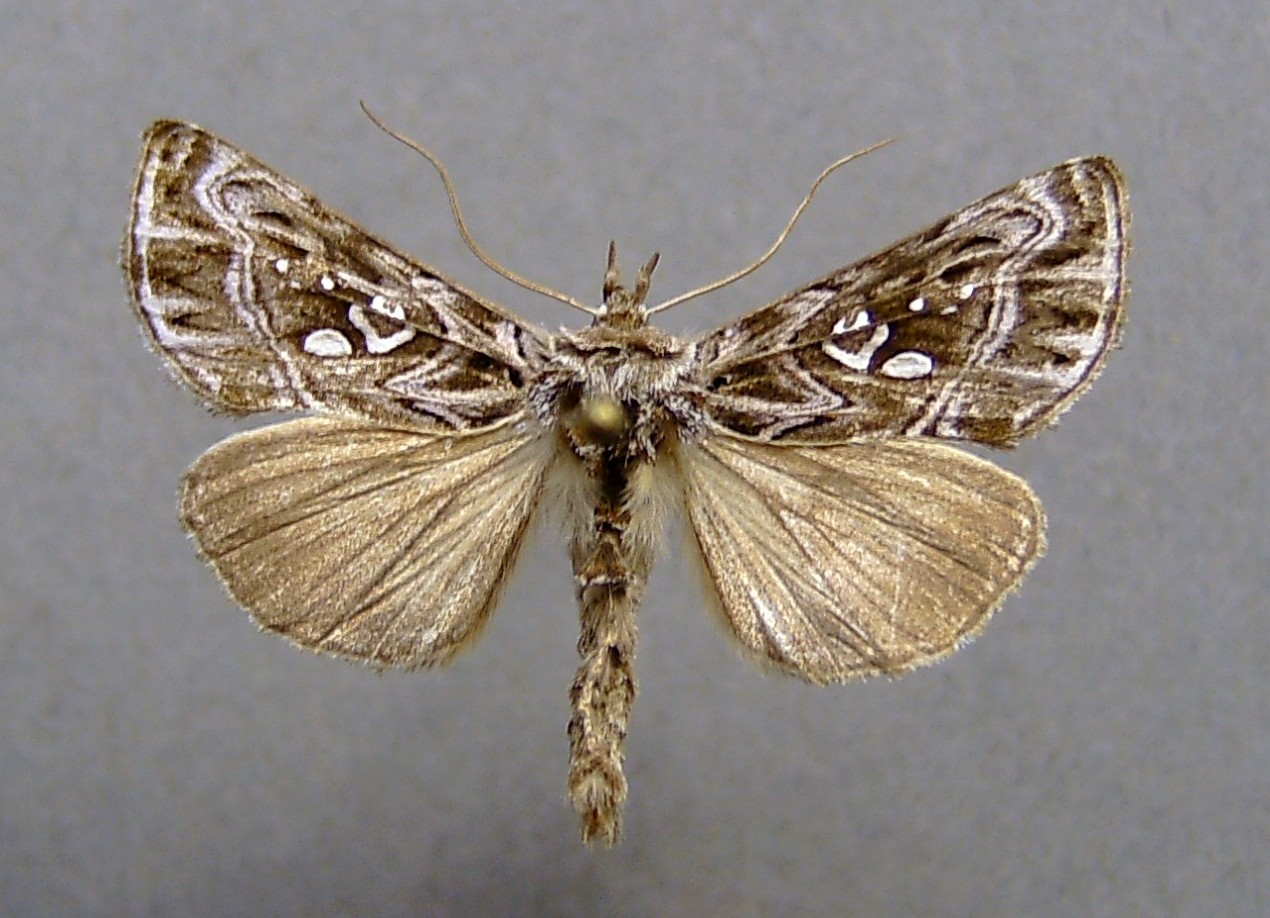

Scientific classification
- Domain: Eukaryota
- Kingdom: Animalia
- Phylum: Arthropoda
- Class: Insecta
- Order: Lepidoptera
- Superfamily: Noctuoidea
- Family: Noctuidae
- Genus: Panchrysia
- Species: P. ornata

Binomial name
- Panchrysia ornata (Bremer, 1864)

Synonyms
- Plusia ornata Bremer, 1864; Phytometra contacta Kozhantschikov, 1923

= Panchrysia ornata =

Species of moth

Panchrysia ornata is a species of moth of the family Noctuidae. It is found from the Ural Mountains, through Siberia, Mongolia, Sikhote-Alin and the Paektu Mountains to Kamchatka and the Pacific coast. It is found up to altitudes of 2,400 meters.

The wingspan is 32–40 mm. There is usually one generation per year, but when conditions are favourable two generations may occur. The main flight time are the months of July and August.

The food plant of the larvae is unknown.
