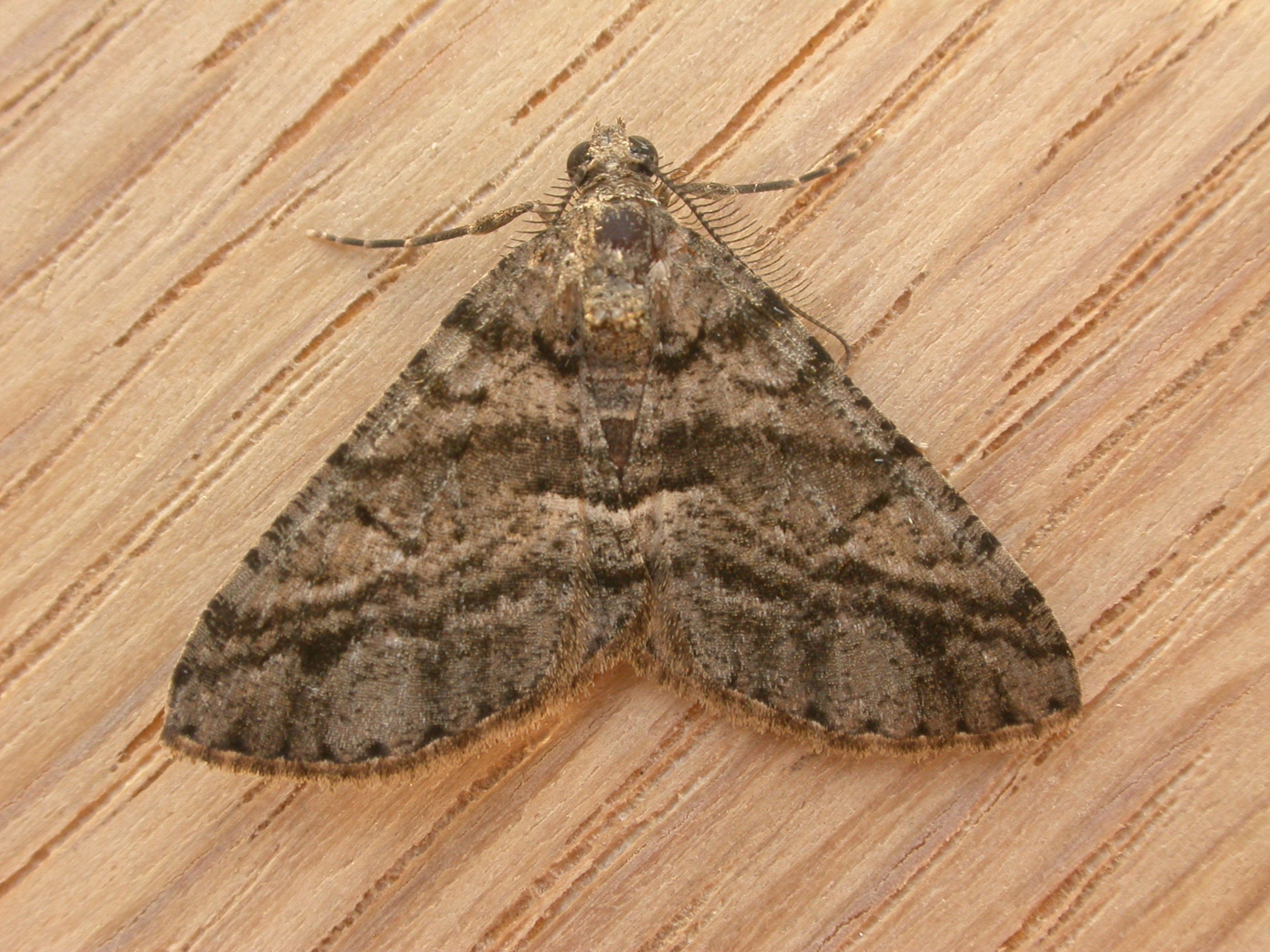
- Lipogya eutheta

Scientific classification
- Kingdom: Animalia
- Phylum: Arthropoda
- Class: Insecta
- Order: Lepidoptera
- Family: Geometridae
- Tribe: Boarmiini
- Genus: Lipogya; Warren, 1898

= Lipogya =

Genus of moths

Lipogya is a genus of moths in the family Geometridae described by Warren in 1898. All are from Australia.

== Species ==
- Lipogya exprimataria (Walker, [1863])
- Lipogya capnota (Meyrick, 1892)
- Lipogya leucoprosopa (Turner, 1947)
- Lipogya eutheta (Turner, 1917)
