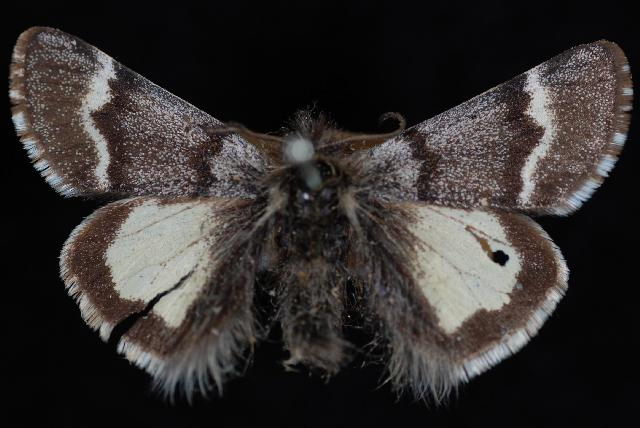

Scientific classification
- Kingdom: Animalia
- Phylum: Arthropoda
- Class: Insecta
- Order: Lepidoptera
- Family: Geometridae
- Subfamily: Archiearinae
- Genus: Leucobrephos; Grote, 1874

= Leucobrephos =

Genus of moths

Leucobrephos is a genus of moths in the family Geometridae.

== Species ==
- Leucobrephos brephoides (Walker, 1857)
- Leucobrephos middendorfii (Menetries, 1858)
- Leucobrephos mongolicum Vojnits, 1977
