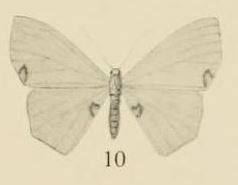

Scientific classification
- Kingdom: Animalia
- Phylum: Arthropoda
- Clade: Pancrustacea
- Class: Insecta
- Order: Lepidoptera
- Family: Geometridae
- Genus: Lophorrhachia; Prout, 1916

= Lophorrhachia =

Genus of moths

Lophorrhachia is a genus of moths in the family Geometridae described by Louis Beethoven Prout in 1916.

== Species ==
- Lophorrhachia niveicristata Prout, 1916 Natal
- Lophorrhachia palliata (Warren, 1898) western Africa
