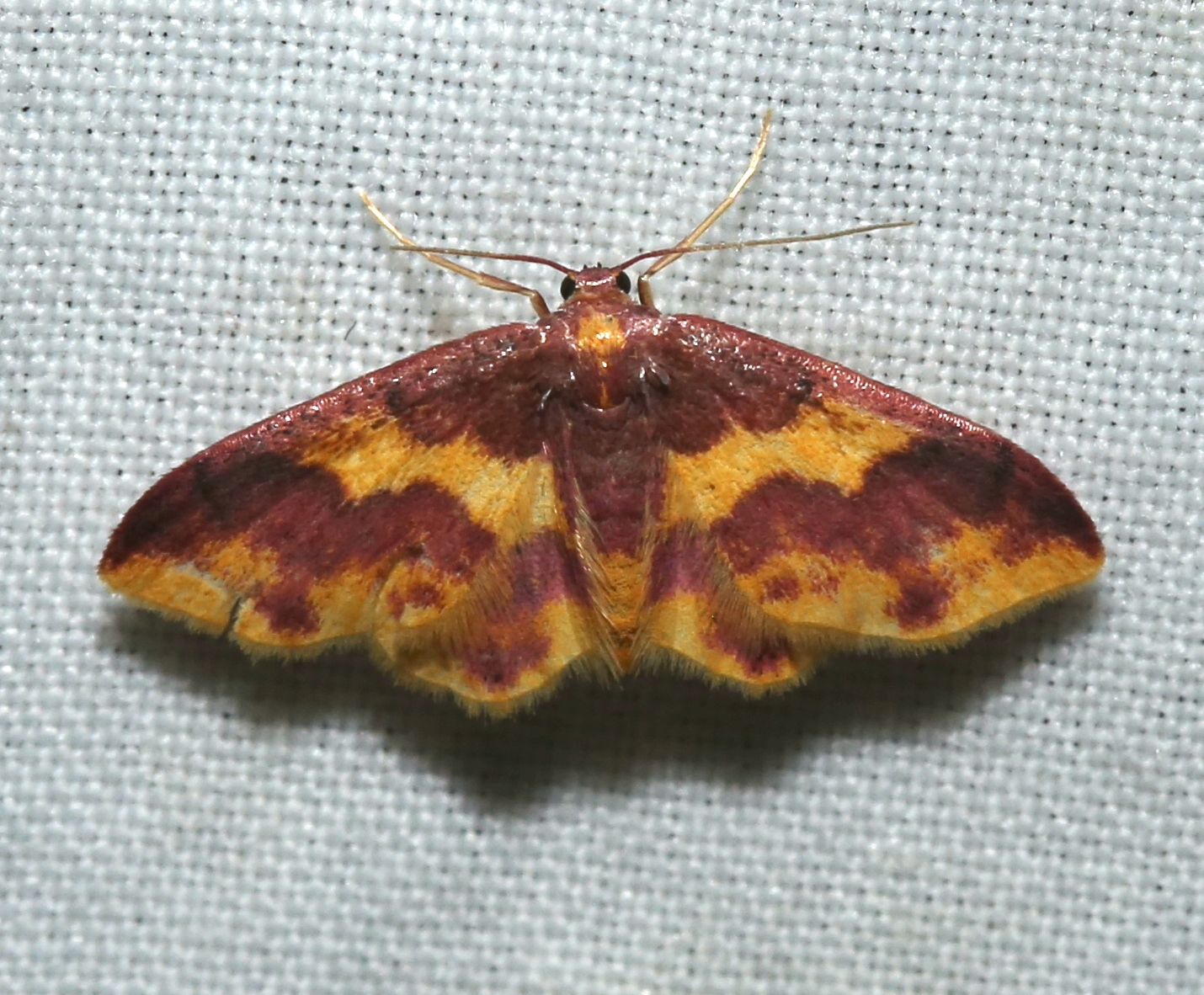

Scientific classification
- Kingdom: Animalia
- Phylum: Arthropoda
- Class: Insecta
- Order: Lepidoptera
- Family: Geometridae
- Genus: Lophosis; Hulst, 1896
- Species: L. labeculata

Binomial name
- Lophosis labeculata (Hulst, 1887)

= Lophosis =

Stained lophosis

Genus of moths

Lophosis is a monotypic geometrid moth genus (family Geometridae). Its only species, Lophosis labeculata, the stained lophosis, is found in North America. Both the genus and species were first described by George Duryea Hulst, the genus in 1896 and the species in 1887.
