= Leucesthes =

Scientific classification
- Kingdom: Animalia
- Phylum: Arthropoda
- Class: Insecta
- Order: Lepidoptera
- Family: Geometridae
- Subfamily: Geometrinae
- Genus: Leucesthes; Warren, 1902
- Species: L. alba

Binomial name
- Leucesthes alba (Swinhoe, 1902)

Synonyms
- Generic: Acibdela Turner, 1906; Specific: Nearcha alba Swinhoe, 1902; Leucesthes margarita Warren, 1902

Genus of moths

Leucesthes is a monotypic moth genus in the family Geometridae described by Warren in 1902. Its only species, Leucesthes alba, was first described by Swinhoe in 1902. It is found in Australia.
