= Laneco (moth) =

Scientific classification
- Kingdom: Animalia
- Phylum: Arthropoda
- Class: Insecta
- Order: Lepidoptera
- Family: Geometridae
- Subfamily: Ennominae
- Genus: Laneco

Genus of moths

Laneco is a genus of moth in the family Geometridae.
