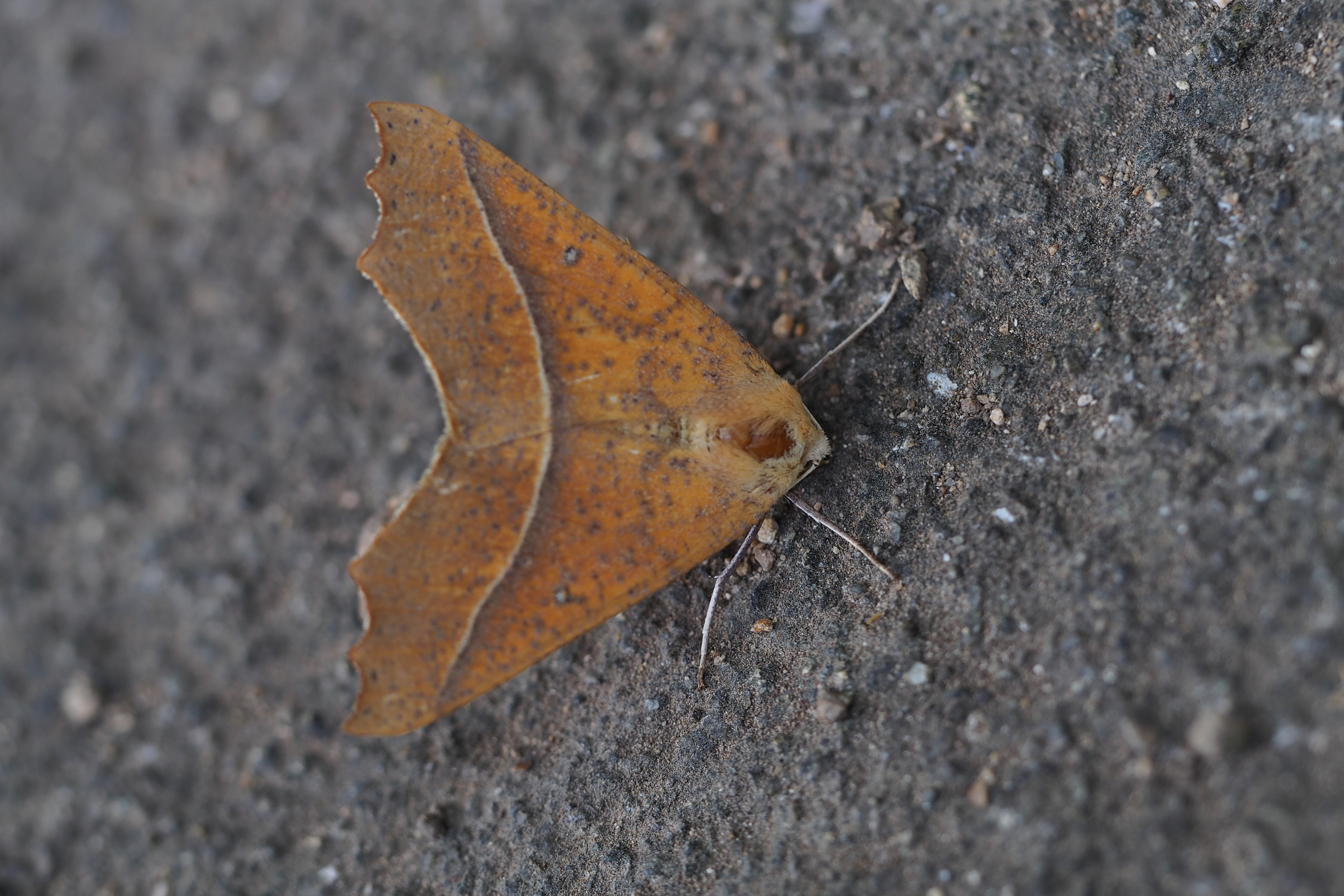
- Odontopera arida

Scientific classification
- Kingdom: Animalia
- Phylum: Arthropoda
- Clade: Pancrustacea
- Class: Insecta
- Order: Lepidoptera
- Family: Geometridae
- Subfamily: Ennominae
- Tribe: Gonodontini
- Genus: Odontopera; Stephens, 1831

Synonyms
- Caripetodes Warren, 1895; Cenoctenucha Warren, 1897; Corotia Moore, 1867; Lioptilesia Wehrli, 1936; Niphonissa Butler, 1878; Paragonodontis Wehrli, 1936; Endropia Guenee, 1857

= Odontopera =

Genus of moths

Odontopera is a genus of moths in the family Geometridae described by Stephens in 1831. Aethiopodes is sometimes also included here.

== Selected species ==
- Odontopera albiguttulata Bastelberger, 1909
- Odontopera bidentata (Clerck, 1759)
- Odontopera bilinearia (Swinhoe, 1890)
- Odontopera insulata Bastelberger, 1909
