= List of geometrid genera: H =

The very large moth family Geometridae contains genera beginning with A, B, C, D, E, F, G, H, I, J, K, L, M, N, O, P, Q, R, S, T, U, V, W, X, Y and Z.

Those beginning with H include:

- Habermania
- Haemalea
- Haematopis
- Haematorithra
- Haggardia
- Hagnagora
- Halesa
- Halioscia
- Halophanes
- Halthia
- Hameopis
- Hammaptera
- Haploceros
- Haplolabida
- Haplopteryx
- Harpagocnema
- Harpicostia
- Harutalcis
- Hashtaresia
- Hasodima
- Hastina
- Hebdomophruda
- Helastia
- Helicopage
- Heliomata
- Heliomystis
- Heliothea
- Helminthoceras
- Hemagalma
- Hemichloreis
- Hemicopha
- Hemicopsis
- Hemidromodes
- Hemigymnodes
- Hemimorina
- Hemioplisis
- Hemiphricta
- Hemipogon
- Hemipterodes
- Hemipyrrha
- Hemistola
- Hemithea
- Hemitheinopsis
- Hemixera
- Hemixesma
- Hemnypia
- Herbita
- Herbulotia
- Hercoloxia
- Herochroma
- Herreshoffia
- Hesperomiza
- Hesperumia
- Heterabraxas
- Heteralex
- Heterarmia
- Heterephyra
- Hetererannis
- Heteresthes
- Heterimpia
- Heterobapta
- Heterocallia
- Heterochasta
- Heterocrita
- Heteroctenia
- Heteroctenis
- Heteroculpinia
- Heterodisca
- Heterogena
- Heteroleuca
- Heterolocha
- Heterophleps
- Heteropithecia
- Heteroptila
- Heterorachis
- Heterostegane
- Heterostegania
- Heterothalera
- Heterothera
- Heterusia
- Hethemia
- Hidalgo
- Hierochthonia
- Himeromima
- Hipparchiscus
- Hirasa
- Hirasichlora
- Hirasodes
- Hirthestes
- Hispophora
- Hissarica
- Holarctias
- Holochroa
- Hololoma
- Holorista
- Holostixa
- Holoterpna
- Homochlodes
- Homodotis
- Homoeochroma
- Homoeoctenia
- Homospora
- Honorana
- Hoplolygris
- Hoplosauris
- Horisme
- Hospitalia
- Hosseusia
- Huapianus
- Huechulafquenia
- Hulstina
- Hyalinetta
- Hyalinometra
- Hyalocampa
- Hyalochlora
- Hyalopola
- Hyalornis
- Hyalorrhoe
- Hyalostenele
- Hybridoneura
- Hydata
- Hydatocapnia
- Hydatopsis
- Hydatoscia
- Hydrelia
- Hydria
- Hydriomena
- Hydrochroa
- Hyelosia
- Hygrochroma
- Hylaea
- Hylasia
- Hylemera
- Hylemeridia
- Hymenocharta
- Hymenodria
- Hymenomima
- Hyostomodes
- Hypagathia
- Hypagyrtis
- Hypapocheima
- Hypenorhynchus
- Hypephyra
- Hypepirritis
- Hyperapeira
- Hyperetis
- Hyperythra
- Hyphalia
- Hyphedyle
- Hyphenophora
- Hypnochlora
- Hypobapta
- Hypochariessa
- Hypochroma
- Hypochrosis
- Hypocoela
- Hypocometa
- Hypodoxa
- Hypographa
- Hypolepis
- Hypomecis
- Hypometalla
- Hypopalpis
- Hypophracta
- Hypoplectis
- Hyposcotis
- Hyposidra
- Hypotephrina
- Hypoxystis
- Hypsitropha
- Hypsometra
- Hypulia
- Hypycnopa
- Hyriogona
- Hysterura
