= Hosseusia =

Hosseusia may refer to:

- Hosseusia (moth), a genus of insects in the family Geometridae
- Hosseusia (fungus), a genus of fungi in family Pannariaceae
