= Haplolabida viettei =

Scientific classification
- Domain: Eukaryota
- Kingdom: Animalia
- Phylum: Arthropoda
- Class: Insecta
- Order: Lepidoptera
- Family: Geometridae
- Genus: Haplolabida
- Species: H. viettei

Binomial name
- Haplolabida viettei Herbulot, 1970

Species of moth

Haplolabida viette is a species of moth of the family Geometridae first described by Claude Herbulot in 1970. It is found in northern Madagascar.

This species looks similar to Haplolabida marojejensis, described by Herbulot in 1963 and Haplolabida lacrimans, described by Herbulot in 1970. The length of its forewings is 13.5 mm.
