= Hypograph =

Hypograph may refer to:

- Hypograph (mathematics), the set of points lying below the graph of a function
- Hypograph, or hypogram, something written at the end of a document (for example, a postscript)

== See also ==
- Hypergraph, in mathematics
- Hypographa, a genus of moths
- Hypographia, another, obsolete, genus of moths
- Hippogriff, a legendary creature
