= Hypolepis =

Hypolepis may refer to:

- Hypolepis (plant), a genus of fern in the family Dennstaedtiaceae
- Psaliodes (syn. Hypolepis), a genus of moth in the family Geometridae
