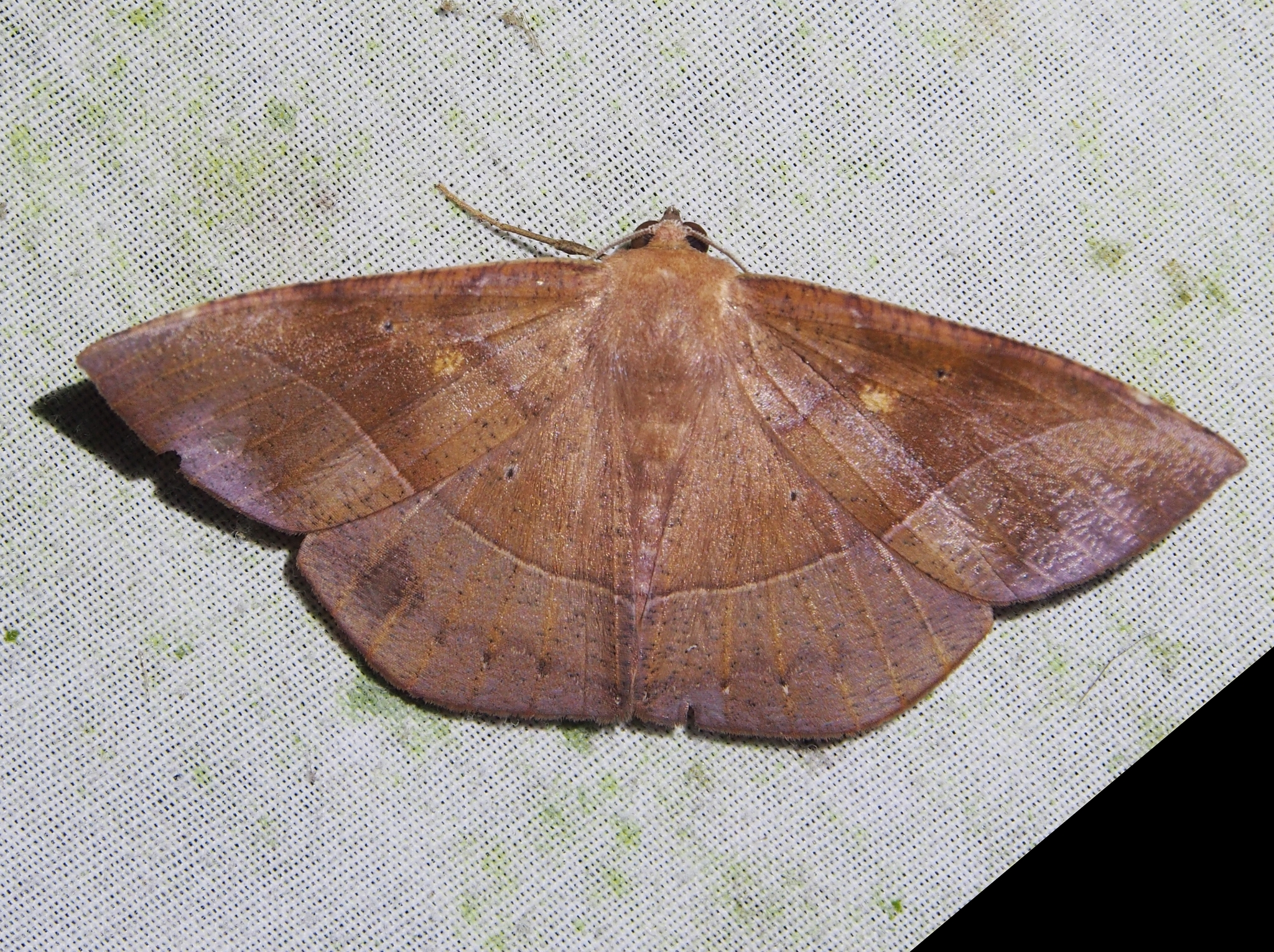
- Herbita medama

Scientific classification
- Kingdom: Animalia
- Phylum: Arthropoda
- Clade: Pancrustacea
- Class: Insecta
- Order: Lepidoptera
- Family: Geometridae
- Subfamily: Ennominae
- Genus: Herbita; Walker, 1860

Synonyms
- Ira Walker, 1860

= Herbita =

Genus of moths

Herbita is a Neotropical genus of moths in the family Geometridae, erected in 1860 by Francis Walker. Species resemble those of Ira, Microgonia and Oxydia, but can be told apart from these by the male genitalia, where the defining characteristics of those three genera are absent in Herbita. Many but not all species of Herbita feature broken, wavy or indistinct line markings and a triangle of three dark brown or pale grey dots on the forewing. Species occur from Mexico south to Brazil, Chile and Argentina.

== Species ==
As of June 2024, the following species are recognized:

- Herbita aglausaria Walker, 1860 - type species
- Herbita albirenata (Warren, 1906)
- Herbita amicaria (Schaus, 1912)
- Herbita artayctes Druce, 1891
- Herbita asinana Prout, 1910
- Herbita atomaria (Walker, 1860)
- Herbita betzi (Herbulot, 1977)
- Herbita capnodiata (Guenée, 1858)
- Herbita capona Dognin, 1900
- Herbita castraria (Schaus, 1901)
- Herbita chiomaria (Schaus, 1923)
- Herbita coctura (Dognin, 1901)
- Herbita crenulata (Warren, 1905)
- Herbita cyclopeata (Möschler, 1882)
- Herbita declinata (Guenée, 1858)
- Herbita decurtaria (Herrich-Schäffer, 1856)
- Herbita dognini (Thierry-Mieg, 1892)
- Herbita domingaria (Dognin, 1924)
- Herbita dulcisona (Prout, 1916)
- Herbita extranea (Schaus, 1911)
- Herbita fulva (Dognin, 1911)
- Herbita hypolizon Prout, 1933
- Herbita incata (Schaus, 1901)
- Herbita lilacina (Warren, 1897)
- Herbita malchusaria (Schaus, 1923)
- Herbita marmorata (Dognin, 1900)
- Herbita medama Druce, 1891
- Herbita medona (Druce, 1892)
- Herbita medullata (Dyar, 1918)
- Herbita nedusia Druce, 1892
- Herbita nestor (Druce, 1892)
- Herbita niebla Dognin, 1896
- Herbita ochriplaga (Warren, 1904)
- Herbita olivata (Warren, 1901)
- Herbita opalizans (Warren, 1904)
- Herbita pallidaria (Jones, 1921)
- Herbita praeditaria (Herrich-Schäffer, 1855)
- Herbita prouti (Giacomelli, 1911)
- Herbita quinquemaculata (Dognin, 1910)
- Herbita reducta (Schaus, 1923)
- Herbita renipuncta (Warren, 1895)
- Herbita rhoda (Butler, 1882)
- Herbita ruadhanaria (Schaus, 1923)
- Herbita siccifolia (Warren, 1904)
- Herbita somnolenta (Warren, 1904)
- Herbita subapicalis (Dognin, 1900)
- Herbita subdentilinea (Dognin, 1911)
- Herbita tanagra (Dognin, 1923)
- Herbita tenebrica Dognin, 1892
- Herbita testinata (Guenée, 1858)
- Herbita tharbaria (Schaus, 1923)
- Herbita transcissa (Walker, 1860)
- Herbita tucumana (Dognin, 1923)
- Herbita ulpianaria (Schaus, 1923)
- Herbita valtrudaria (Schaus, 1923)
- Herbita versilinea (Warren, 1904)
- Herbita vinosata (Guenée, 1858)
- Herbita zarina (Dognin, 1893)
