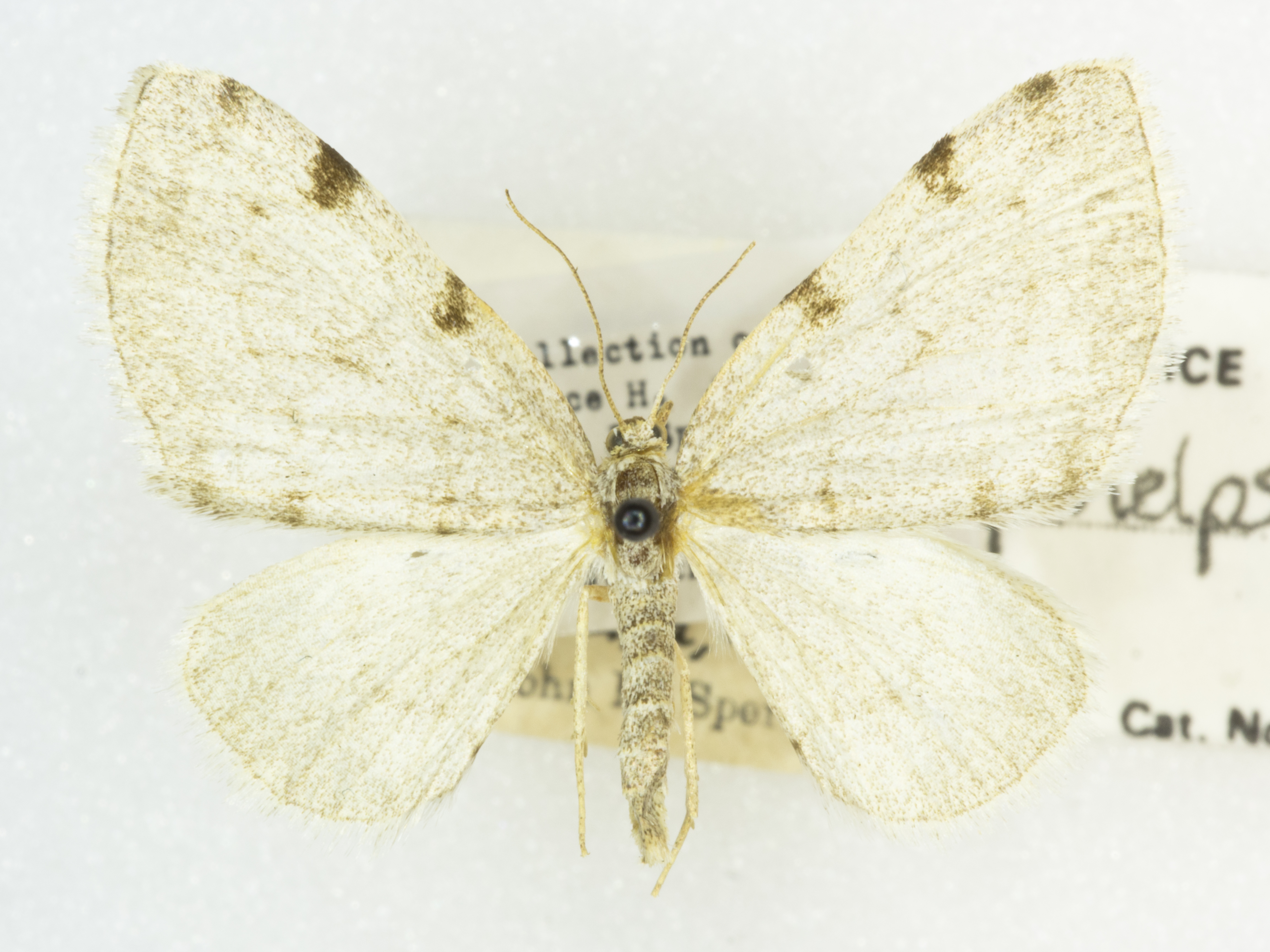

Scientific classification
- Kingdom: Animalia
- Phylum: Arthropoda
- Class: Insecta
- Order: Lepidoptera
- Family: Geometridae
- Genus: Heterophleps
- Species: H. refusaria

Binomial name
- Heterophleps refusaria (Walker, 1861)

= Heterophleps refusaria =

Species of moth

Heterophleps refusaria, the three-patched bigwing, is a species of geometrid moth in the family Geometridae. It was described by Francis Walker in 1861 and is found in North America.

The MONA or Hodges number for Heterophleps refusaria is 7645.
