= Heterorachis diaphana =

Scientific classification
- Kingdom: Animalia
- Phylum: Arthropoda
- Class: Insecta
- Order: Lepidoptera
- Family: Geometridae
- Genus: Heterorachis
- Species: H. diaphana

Binomial name
- Heterorachis diaphana (Warren, 1899)

Synonyms
- Prasinocyma diaphana Warren, 1899; Heterorachis schassmanni Prout, 1916

Species of moth

Heterorachis diaphana is a species of moth of the family Geometridae. It is found in Madagascar.

The forewings & hindwings of this species are very transparent, pale yellow-green, rippled with white; costa finely ochreous; the fringe is pale green, cell spot black.

It has an expanse of 21mm. The holotype was collected North-East of Fianarantsoa in the Forrest of Ivohimanitra (North of Ambohimanga Sud).
