= Heterorachis asyllaria =

Scientific classification
- Kingdom: Animalia
- Phylum: Arthropoda
- Class: Insecta
- Order: Lepidoptera
- Family: Geometridae
- Genus: Heterorachis
- Species: H. asyllaria

Binomial name
- Heterorachis asyllaria (C. Swinhoe, 1904)

Synonyms
- Prasinocyma asyllaria Warren, 1899

Species of moth

Heterorachis asyllaria is a species of moth of the family Geometridae first described by Charles Swinhoe in 1904. It is found on Madagascar.

Head, thorax and wings of this species are grass green, forewings with a black spot at the end of the cell and the costal lines ochreous; both wings with the cilia white marked with green. The body is whitish, legs pinkish ochreous, antennae, palpi and frons pinkish ochreous.

The wingspan of this species is 30 mm.
