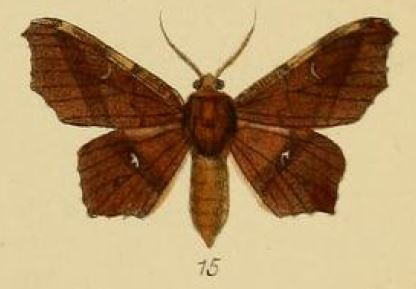

Scientific classification
- Kingdom: Animalia
- Phylum: Arthropoda
- Class: Insecta
- Order: Lepidoptera
- Family: Geometridae
- Genus: Hyalornis
- Species: H. docta

Binomial name
- Hyalornis docta (Schaus & Clements, 1893)

Synonyms
- Focilla docta Schaus & Clements, 1893; Azelinopsis brunnea Warren, 1897; Neuropolodes fulvata Warren, 1901; Coptopteryx propinqua Holland, 1893

= Hyalornis docta =

Species of moth

Hyalornis docta is a moth of the family Geometridae described by William Schaus and W. G. Clements in 1893. It is found in Cameroon, Nigeria, Gabon and Sierra Leone.
