= Hulstina grossbecki =

Scientific classification
- Domain: Eukaryota
- Kingdom: Animalia
- Phylum: Arthropoda
- Class: Insecta
- Order: Lepidoptera
- Family: Geometridae
- Tribe: Boarmiini
- Genus: Hulstina
- Species: H. grossbecki

Binomial name
- Hulstina grossbecki Rindge, 1970

Species of moth

Hulstina grossbecki is a species of geometrid moth in the family Geometridae. It is found in North America.

The MONA or Hodges number for Hulstina grossbecki is 6545.
