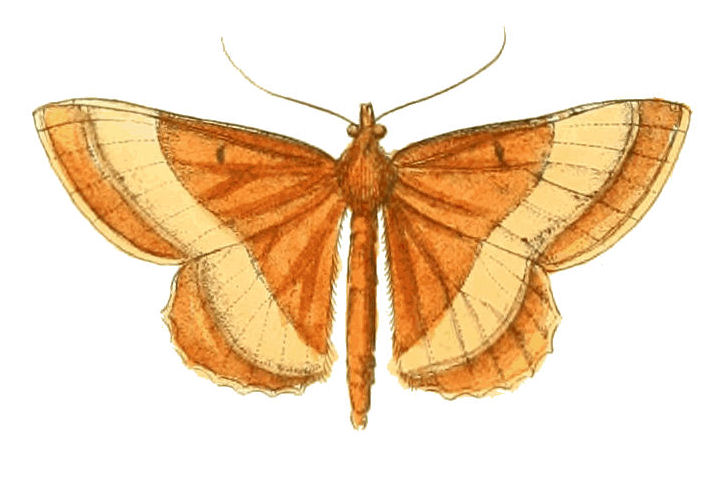
- Illustration by Dru Drury

Scientific classification
- Kingdom: Animalia
- Phylum: Arthropoda
- Clade: Pancrustacea
- Class: Insecta
- Order: Lepidoptera
- Family: Geometridae
- Genus: Melinoessa
- Species: M. fulvescens

Binomial name
- Melinoessa fulvescens Prout L. B., 1916

Synonyms
- Phalaena fulvata Drury, 1782 (preocc. Forster 1771)

= Melinoessa fulvescens =

Species of moth

Melinoessa fulvescens is a species of moth in the family Geometridae, native to Sierra Leone and Gambia. It was described by Dru Drury in 1782 as Phalaena fulvata, a name which was pre-occupied (see Cidaria fulvata). The current, slightly different, specific name was given by L. B. Prout in 1916.

== Description ==
Upper Side. Antennae setaceous and yellow. Thorax and abdomen yellow. Wings deep straw-coloured, the anterior having a small black spot placed near the middle of the anterior edges. A small narrow line of a silverish colour runs along the external edges of these wings, beginning near the tips, and continuing along the edges of the posterior ones, ends at the abdominal corners.

Under Side. Breast, legs, and abdomen whiteish. Wings coloured as on the upper side, but dappled with minute reddish streaks. Margins of the wings entire. Wing-span somewhat more than 1½ inches (40 mm).
