= Psaliodes fervescens =

Scientific classification
- Kingdom: Animalia
- Phylum: Arthropoda
- Class: Insecta
- Order: Lepidoptera
- Family: Geometridae
- Genus: Psaliodes
- Species: P. fervescens

Binomial name
- Psaliodes fervescens Dyar, 1920

Species of moth

Psaliodes fervescens is a species of moth in the family Geometridae first described by Harrison Gray Dyar Jr. in 1920. It is found in Central America.

The MONA or Hodges number for Psaliodes fervescens is 7315.
