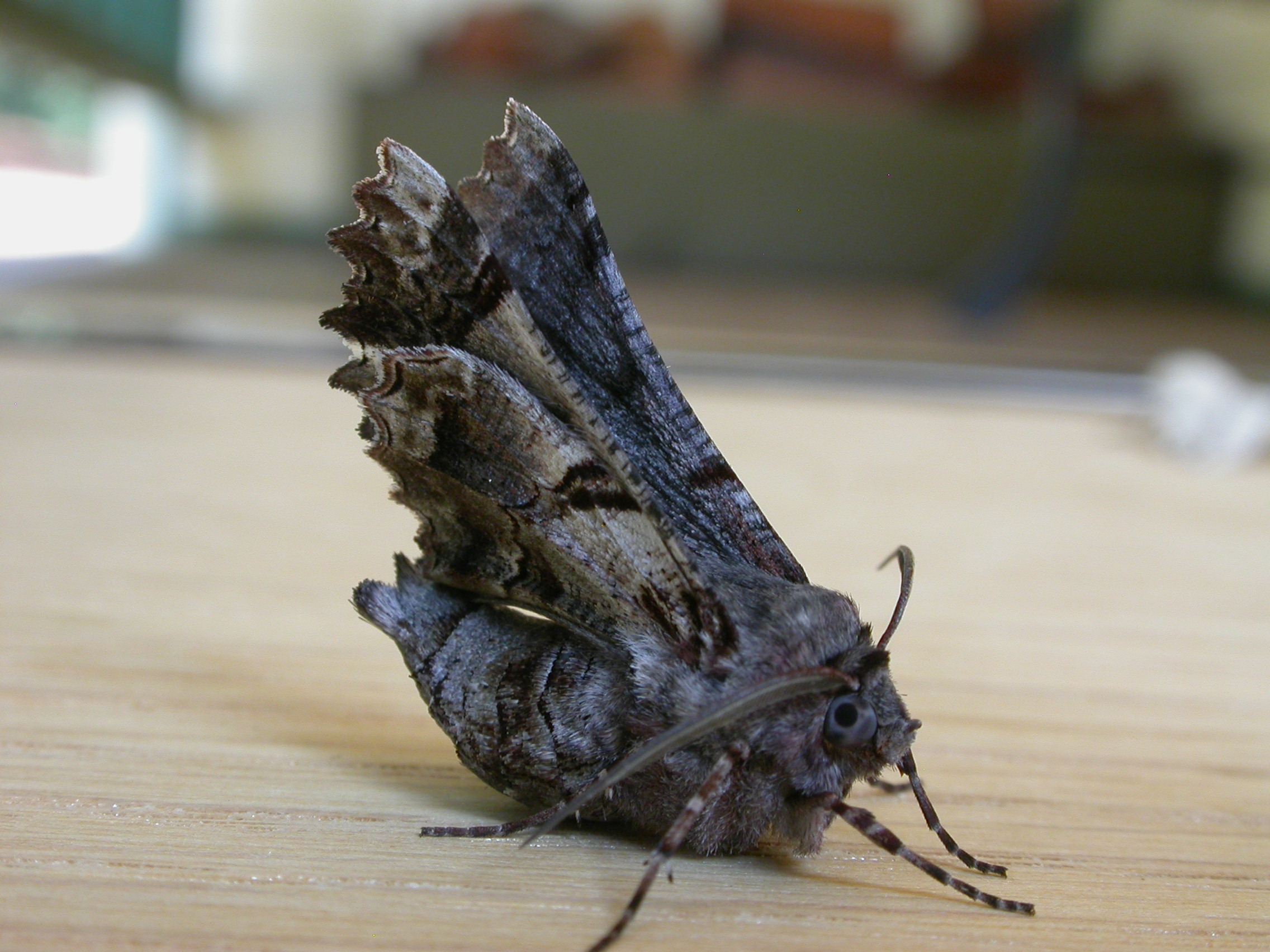

Scientific classification
- Kingdom: Animalia
- Phylum: Arthropoda
- Class: Insecta
- Order: Lepidoptera
- Family: Geometridae
- Genus: Hypographa
- Species: H. phlegetonaria

Binomial name
- Hypographa phlegetonaria Guenée, 1857

= Hypographa phlegetonaria =

Species of moth

Hypographa phlegetonaria is a species of moth of the family Geometridae first described by Achille Guenée in 1857. It is found in Australia, including Tasmania.
