= Homochlodes lactispargaria =

Scientific classification
- Kingdom: Animalia
- Phylum: Arthropoda
- Class: Insecta
- Order: Lepidoptera
- Family: Geometridae
- Tribe: Lithinini
- Genus: Homochlodes
- Species: H. lactispargaria

Binomial name
- Homochlodes lactispargaria (Walker in D'Urban, 1861)

Species of moth

Homochlodes lactispargaria is a species of geometrid moth in the family Geometridae. It is found in North America.

The MONA or Hodges number for Homochlodes lactispargaria is 6811.
