= Hyalornis livida =

Scientific classification
- Kingdom: Animalia
- Phylum: Arthropoda
- Class: Insecta
- Order: Lepidoptera
- Family: Geometridae
- Genus: Hyalornis
- Species: H. livida

Binomial name
- Hyalornis livida Herbulot, 1973

Species of moth

Hyalornis livida is a moth of the family Geometridae first described by Claude Herbulot in 1973. It is found in Cameroon.

== See also ==
- List of moths of Cameroon
