= Hulstina imitatrix =

Scientific classification
- Kingdom: Animalia
- Phylum: Arthropoda
- Clade: Pancrustacea
- Class: Insecta
- Order: Lepidoptera
- Family: Geometridae
- Tribe: Boarmiini
- Genus: Hulstina
- Species: H. imitatrix

Binomial name
- Hulstina imitatrix Rindge, 1970

Species of moth

Hulstina imitatrix is a species of geometrid moth in the family Geometridae. It is found in North America.

The MONA or Hodges number for Hulstina imitatrix is 6541.

== Subspecies ==
These two subspecies belong to the species Hulstina imitatrix:

- Hulstina imitatrix fulva Rindge, 1970
- Hulstina imitatrix imitatrix
