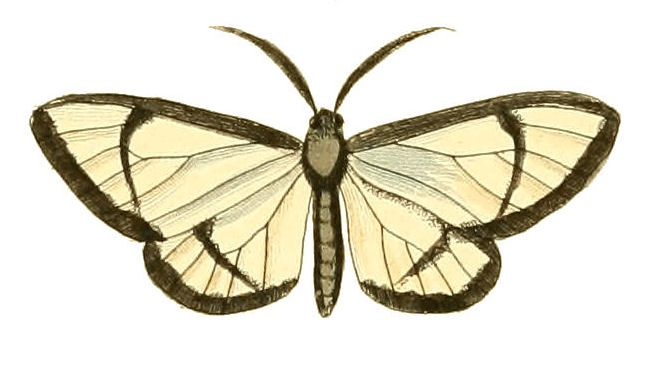
- Illustration by Dru Drury

Scientific classification
- Kingdom: Animalia
- Phylum: Arthropoda
- Class: Insecta
- Order: Lepidoptera
- Family: Geometridae
- Genus: Locha
- Species: L. hyalina

Binomial name
- Locha hyalina (Walker, 1854)

Synonyms
- Phalaena diaphana Drury, 1782 (preoccupied); Dioptis hyalina Walker, 1854; Locha perspicua Butler, 1876; Hyalocampa specularis Warren, 1900

= Locha hyalina =

Species of moth

Locha hyalina is a moth species in the family Geometridae from Central and parts of South America. It was described by Dru Drury in 1782, but his name Phalaena diaphana was invalid as pre-occupied (see Eloria diaphana).

== Description ==
Upperside: Antennae pectinated (comb like). Thorax brown. Abdomen black, brown above. Wings diaphanous, the edges being bordered with black, a black band also crosses the anterior, from the anterior edges to the lower corners.

Underside: Tongue spiral. Breast and legs black. Abdomen grey. Anus yellowish. Wings coloured on this side as on the upper. Margins of the wings entire. Wingspan 1 3/4 inches (44 mm).
