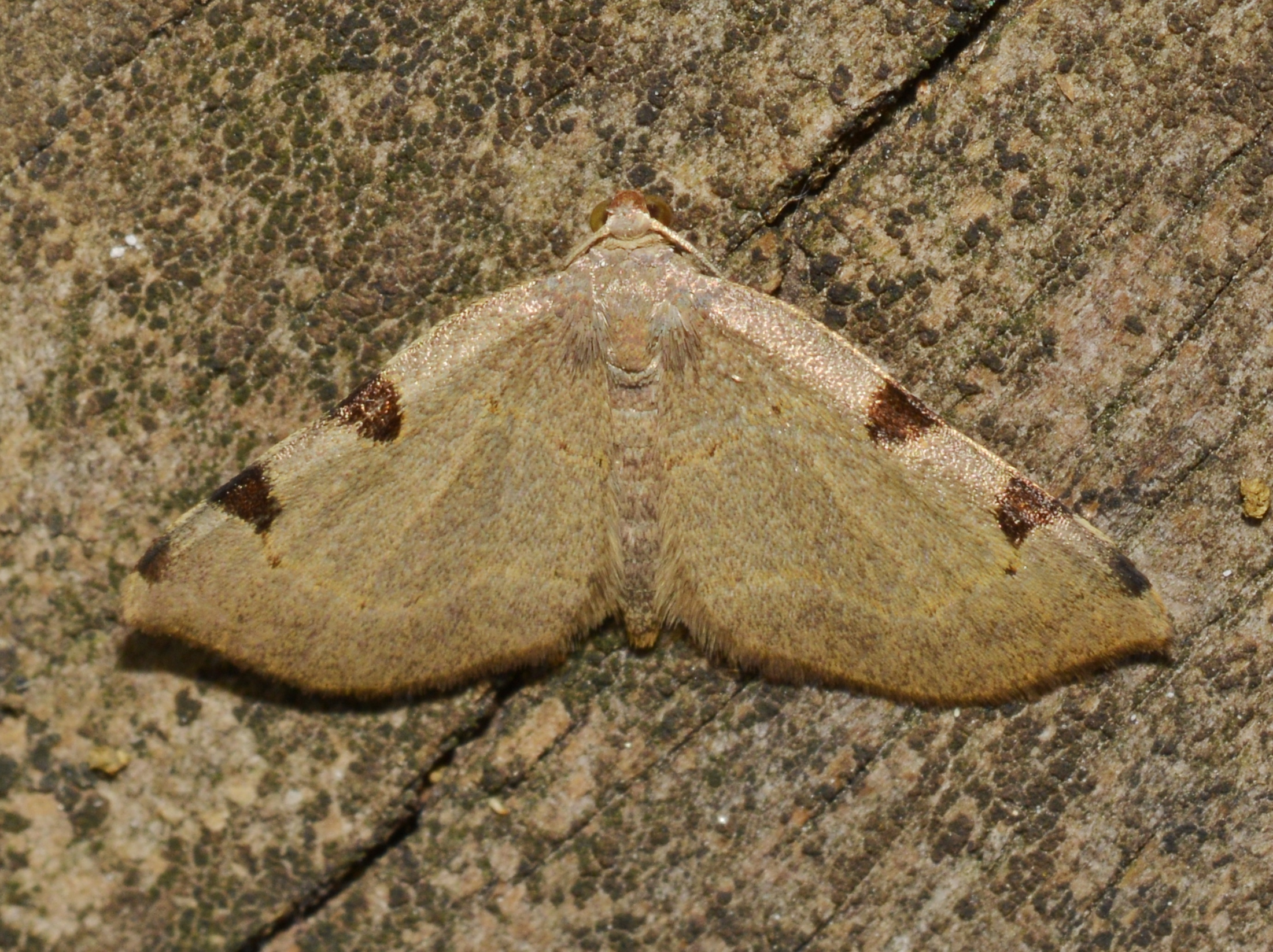

Scientific classification
- Domain: Eukaryota
- Kingdom: Animalia
- Phylum: Arthropoda
- Class: Insecta
- Order: Lepidoptera
- Family: Geometridae
- Subfamily: Larentiinae
- Genus: Heterophleps
- Species: H. triguttaria

Binomial name
- Heterophleps triguttaria Herrich-Schäffer, 1854

= Heterophleps triguttaria =

Species of moth

Heterophleps triguttaria, the three-spotted fillip, is a species of geometrid moth in the family Geometridae. It is found in North America.

The MONA or Hodges number for Heterophleps triguttaria is 7647.

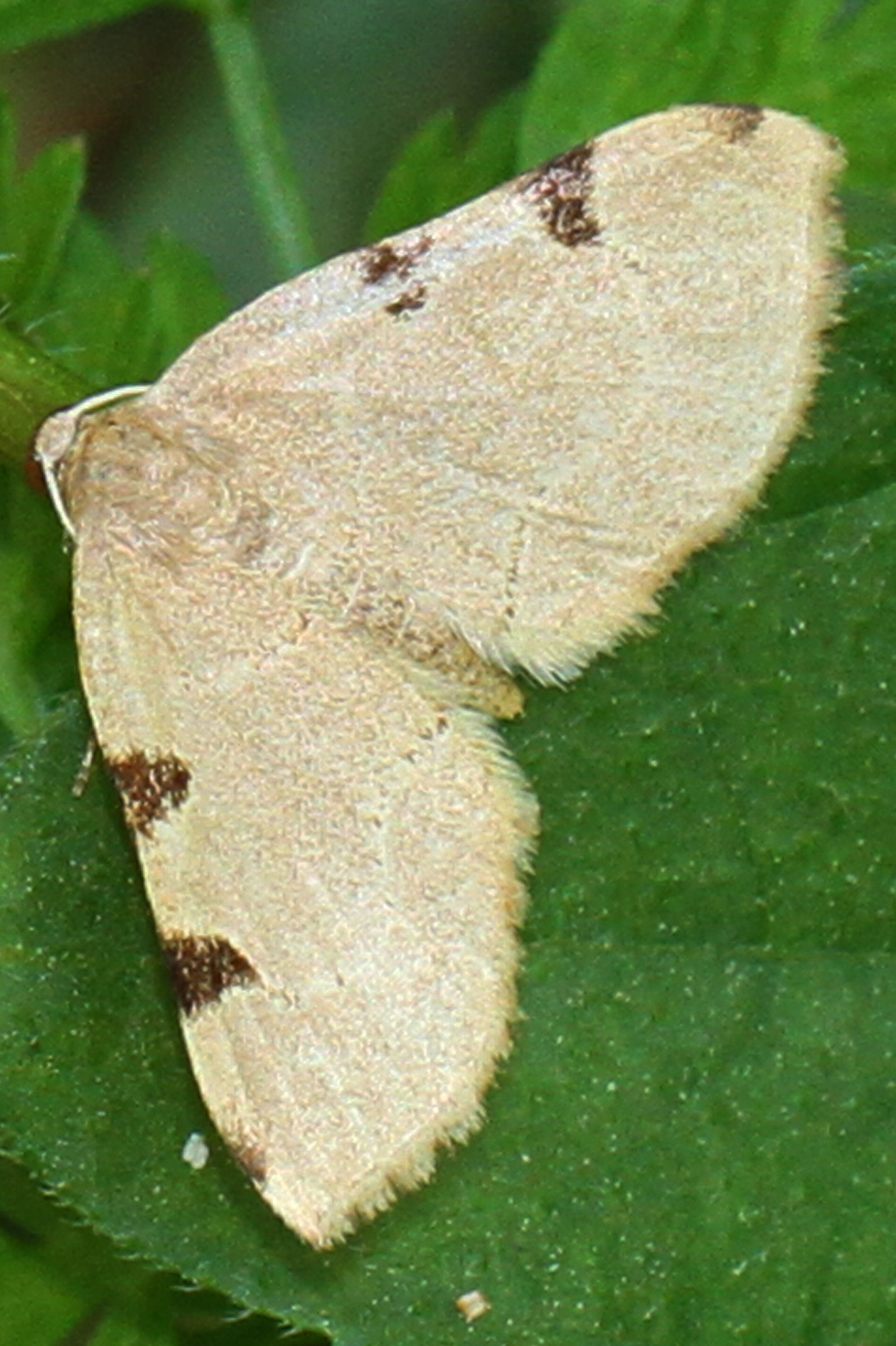
Three-spotted fillip, Heterophleps triguttaria
