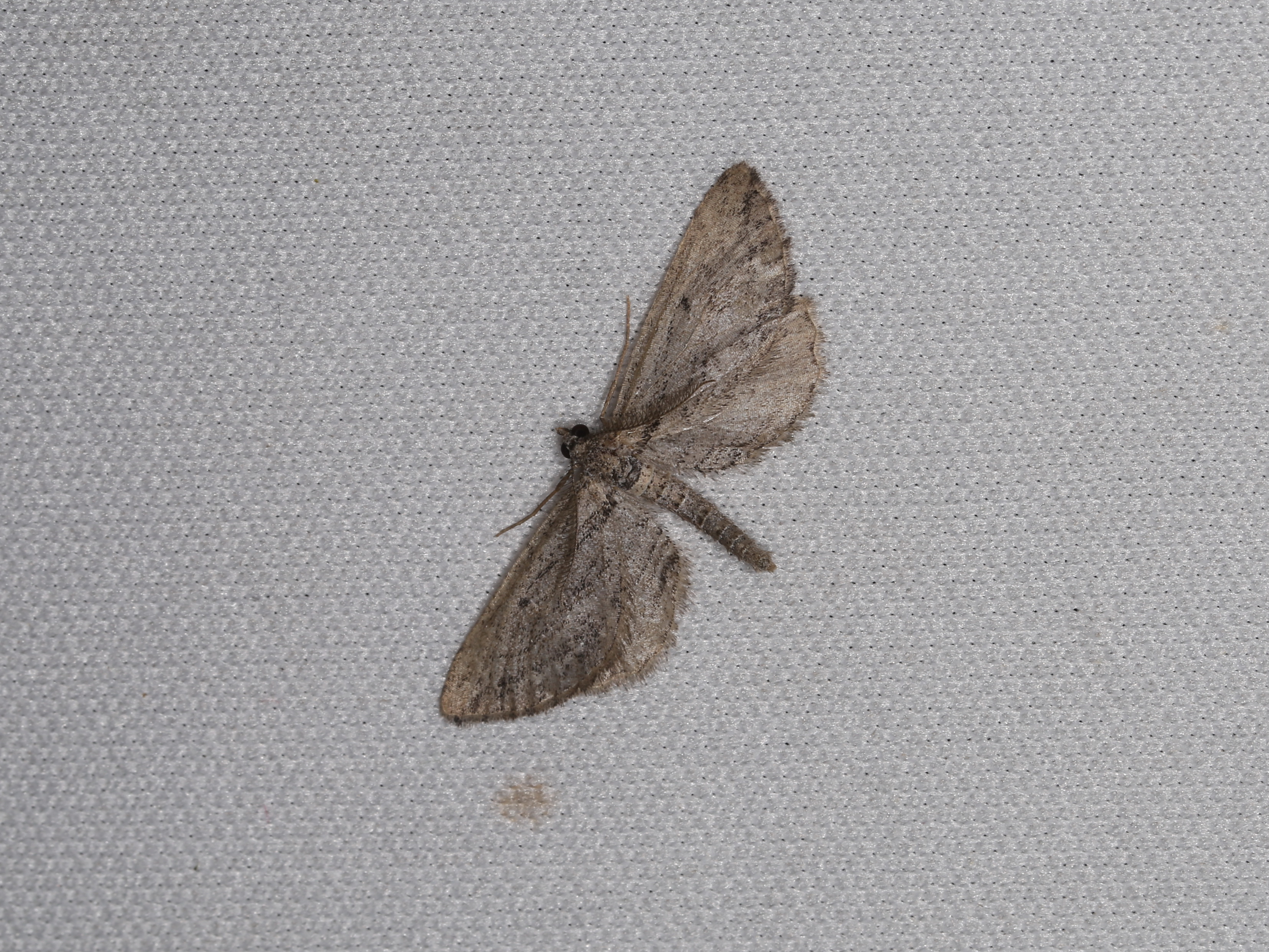

Scientific classification
- Kingdom: Animalia
- Phylum: Arthropoda
- Class: Insecta
- Order: Lepidoptera
- Family: Geometridae
- Tribe: Boarmiini
- Genus: Hulstina
- Species: H. exhumata

Binomial name
- Hulstina exhumata (Swett, 1918)

= Hulstina exhumata =

Species of moth

Hulstina exhumata is a species of geometrid moth in the family Geometridae. It is found in North America.

The MONA or Hodges number for Hulstina exhumata is 6546.
