= Hulstina aridata =

Scientific classification
- Domain: Eukaryota
- Kingdom: Animalia
- Phylum: Arthropoda
- Class: Insecta
- Order: Lepidoptera
- Family: Geometridae
- Genus: Hulstina
- Species: H. aridata

Binomial name
- Hulstina aridata Barnes & Benjamin, 1929

Species of moth

Hulstina aridata is a species of moth in the family Geometridae first described by William Barnes and Foster Hendrickson Benjamin in 1929. It is found in North America.

The MONA or Hodges number for Hulstina aridata is 6543.
