= Homochlodes disconventa =

Scientific classification
- Kingdom: Animalia
- Phylum: Arthropoda
- Class: Insecta
- Order: Lepidoptera
- Family: Geometridae
- Genus: Homochlodes
- Species: H. disconventa

Binomial name
- Homochlodes disconventa (Walker, 1860)

Species of moth

Homochlodes disconventa is a species of geometrid moth in the family Geometridae. It was described by Francis Walker in 1860 and is found in North America.

The MONA or Hodges number for Homochlodes disconventa is 6813.
