= Hulstina wrightiaria =

Scientific classification
- Domain: Eukaryota
- Kingdom: Animalia
- Phylum: Arthropoda
- Class: Insecta
- Order: Lepidoptera
- Family: Geometridae
- Genus: Hulstina
- Species: H. wrightiaria

Binomial name
- Hulstina wrightiaria (Hulst, 1888)

Species of moth

Hulstina wrightiaria, or Wright's hulstina, is a species of geometrid moth in the family Geometridae. It is found in North America.

The MONA or Hodges number for Hulstina wrightiaria is 6547.
