= Hypocoela tornifusca =

Scientific classification
- Kingdom: Animalia
- Phylum: Arthropoda
- Clade: Pancrustacea
- Class: Insecta
- Order: Lepidoptera
- Family: Geometridae
- Genus: Hypocoela
- Species: H. tornifusca

Binomial name
- Hypocoela tornifusca Herbulot, 1970

Species of moth

Hypocoela tornifusca is a species of moth of the family Geometridae first described by Claude Herbulot in 1970. It is found in northern Madagascar. where it is known from the high altitudes of the Massif du Tsaratanana.

Its wings are yellowish-green with brown stains. The length of its forewings is 18 mm (0.71 in).
