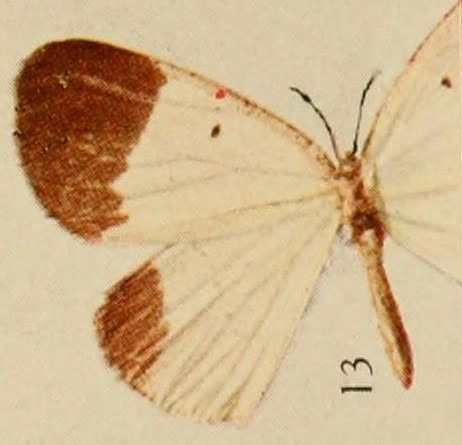

Scientific classification
- Kingdom: Animalia
- Phylum: Arthropoda
- Class: Insecta
- Order: Lepidoptera
- Family: Geometridae
- Genus: Melinoessa
- Species: M. pieridaria

Binomial name
- Melinoessa pieridaria (Holland, 1920)

Synonyms
- Rhamidava pieridaria Holland, 1920

= Melinoessa pieridaria =

Species of moth

Melinoessa pieridaria is a moth of the family Geometridae first described by William Jacob Holland in 1920. It is found in the Democratic Republic of the Congo.
