= Heterodisca scardamiata =

Scientific classification
- Domain: Eukaryota
- Kingdom: Animalia
- Phylum: Arthropoda
- Class: Insecta
- Order: Lepidoptera
- Family: Geometridae
- Genus: Heterodisca
- Species: H. scardamiata

Binomial name
- Heterodisca scardamiata Warren, 1896

Synonyms
- Heterodisca flavimacula Prout, 1929

Species of moth

Heterodisca scardamiata is a moth in the family Geometridae. It is endemic to Indonesian New Guinea.

== Appearance ==
This species has two distinct male and female patterns. Males of the species are really light with small lines crossing through their wings like a strikethrough. These are the same in the females but the females instead of light grey of the males for the lines have dark black stark lines. males of the species do not have clear fringing as females which are very lightly fringed 6 times on each wing towards the bottom. The wings have hairy tips. overall coloration of this species is orange but in females it starts to go into a dusting of brown. there are 4 spots near the edge of the bottom wings and two eyespots on the outside of the wings on the females. the males have faint eyespots on their wings and erratic speckling towards the bottom.

== Records ==
There are two records on the internet of live specimens both female.

There are also very few dead specimens of males and many female specimens. this suggests males are less common.
