= Heterusia atalantata =

Scientific classification
- Kingdom: Animalia
- Phylum: Arthropoda
- Class: Insecta
- Order: Lepidoptera
- Family: Geometridae
- Genus: Heterusia
- Species: H. atalantata

Binomial name
- Heterusia atalantata (Guenée in Boisduval & Guenée, 1858)

Species of moth

Heterusia atalantata is a species of geometrid moth in the family Geometridae. It is found in Central America, North America, and South America.

The MONA or Hodges number for Heterusia atalantata is 7367.
