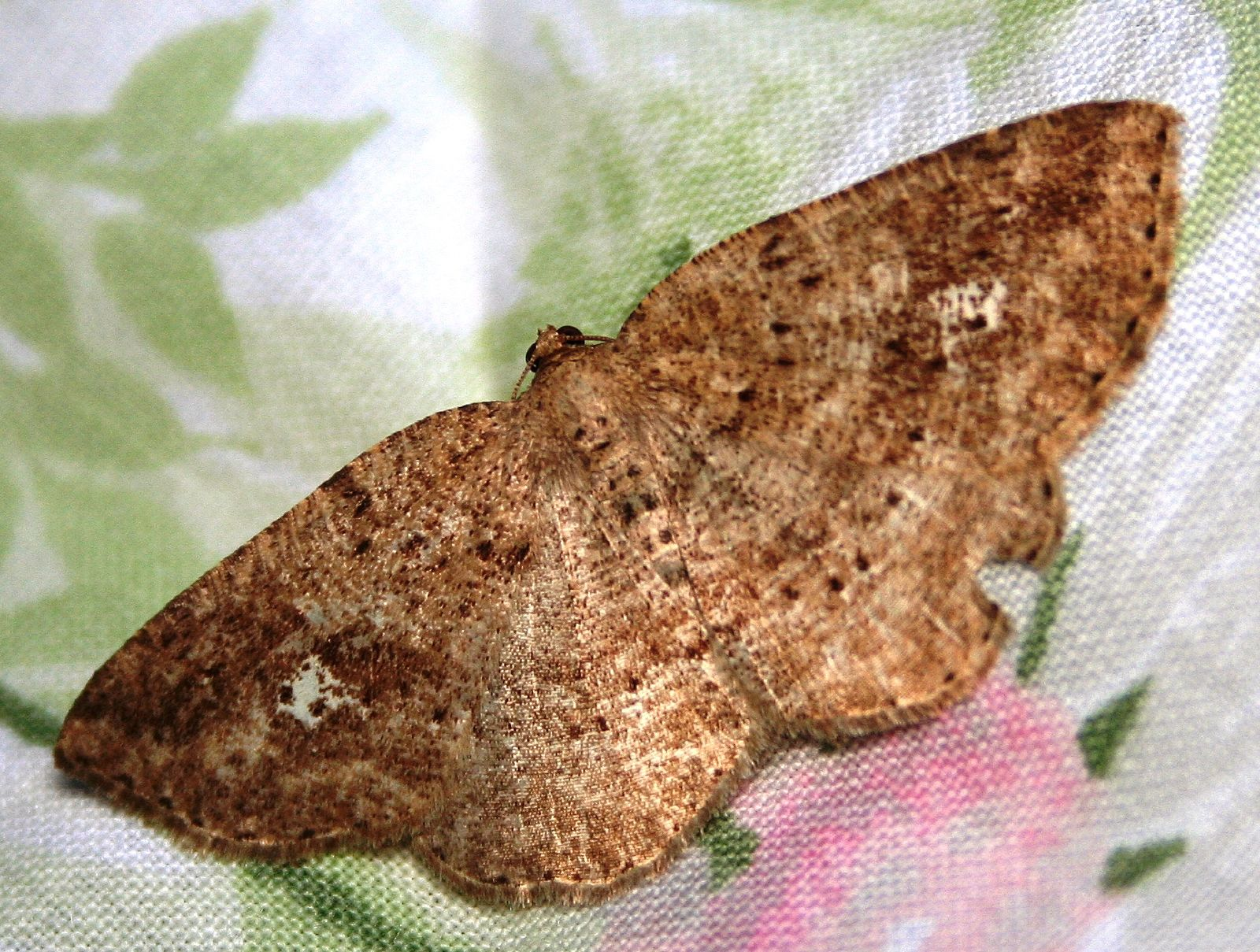

Scientific classification
- Kingdom: Animalia
- Phylum: Arthropoda
- Clade: Pancrustacea
- Class: Insecta
- Order: Lepidoptera
- Family: Geometridae
- Tribe: Lithinini
- Genus: Homochlodes
- Species: H. fritillaria

Binomial name
- Homochlodes fritillaria (Guenée in Boisduval & Guenée, 1858)

= Homochlodes fritillaria =

Species of moth

Homochlodes fritillaria, the pale homochlodes, is a species of geometrid moth in the family Geometridae. It is found in North America.
