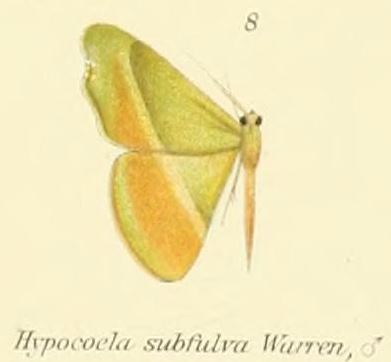

Scientific classification
- Kingdom: Animalia
- Phylum: Arthropoda
- Clade: Pancrustacea
- Class: Insecta
- Order: Lepidoptera
- Family: Geometridae
- Genus: Hypocoela
- Species: H. subfulva

Binomial name
- Hypocoela subfulva Warren, 1897

= Hypocoela subfulva =

Species of moth

Hypocoela subfulva is a species of moth in the family Geometridae. It was described by William Warren in 1897. It has a distribution across West and Central Africa.
