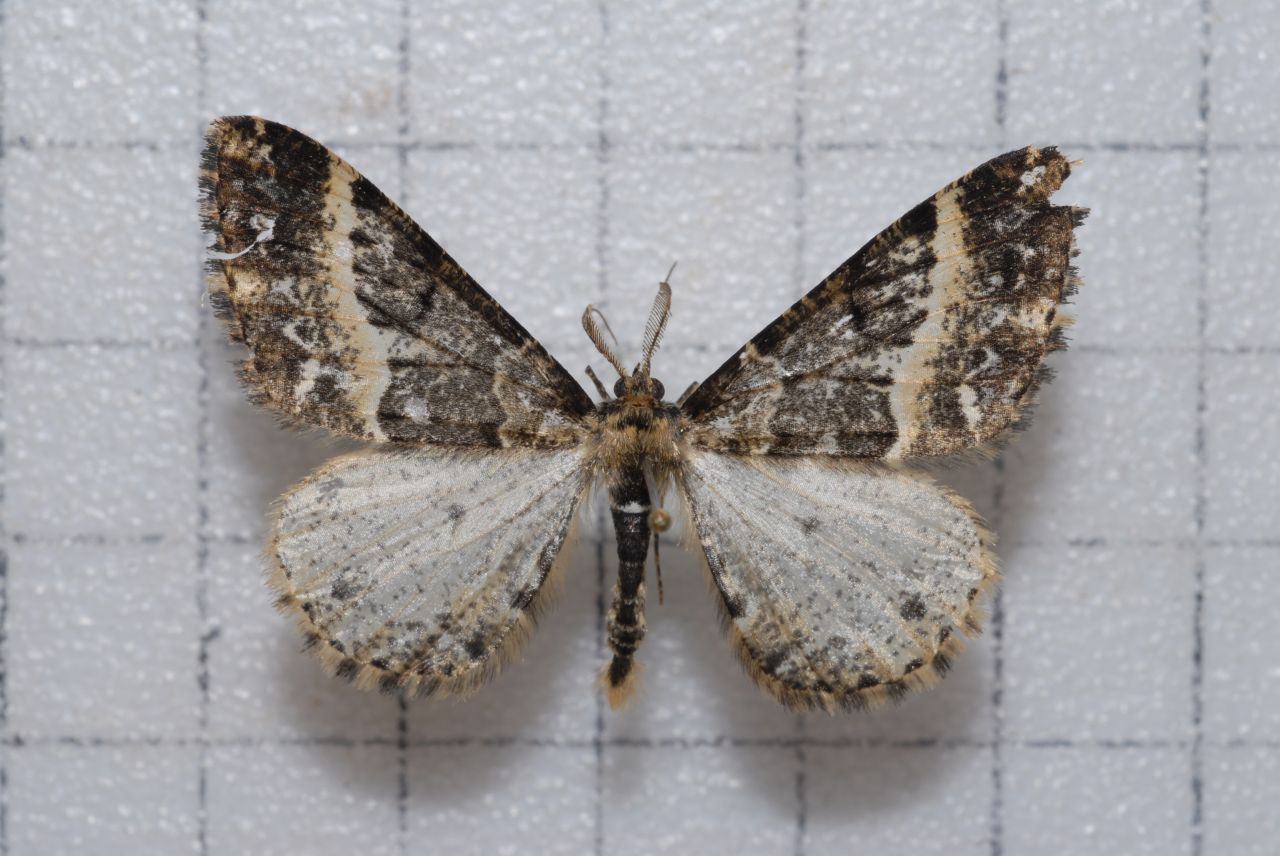

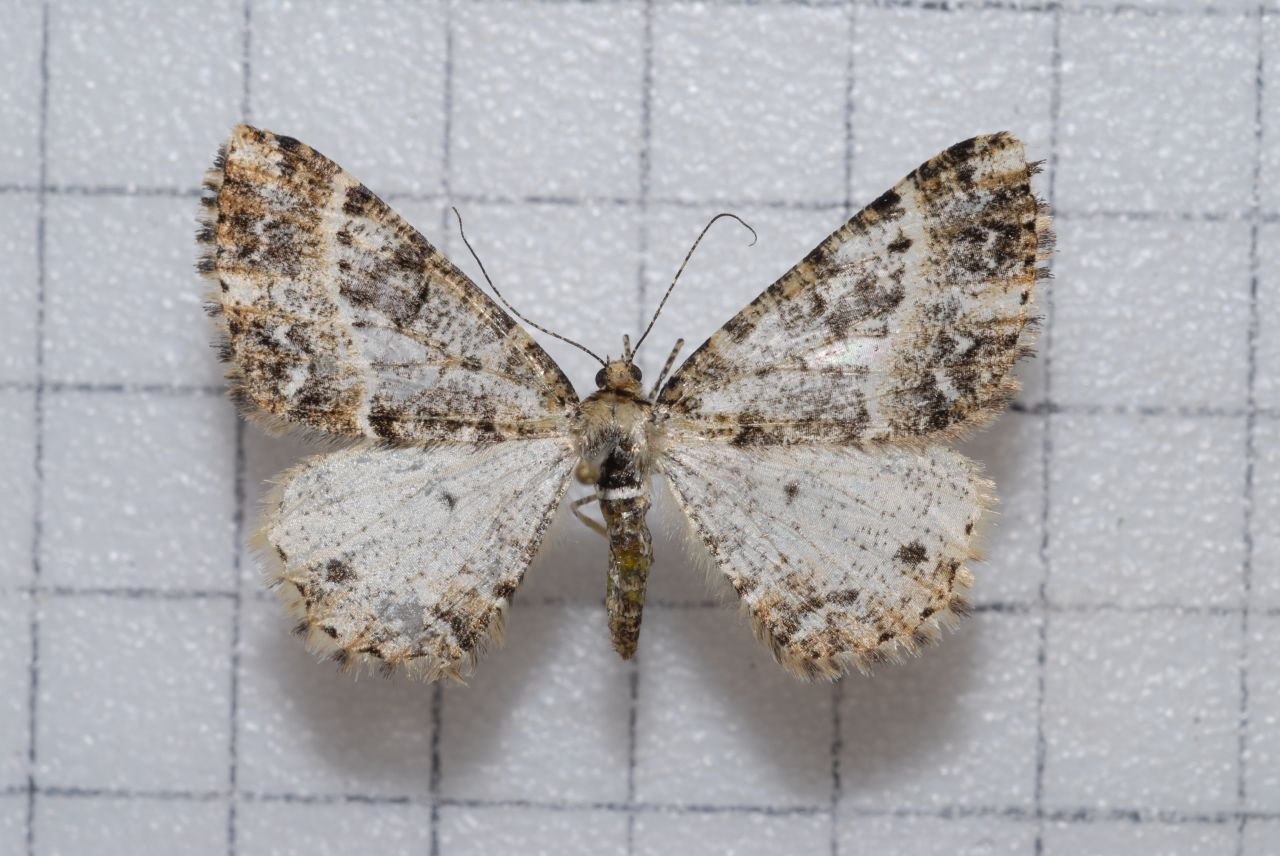

Scientific classification
- Kingdom: Animalia
- Phylum: Arthropoda
- Class: Insecta
- Order: Lepidoptera
- Family: Geometridae
- Genus: Harutalcis
- Species: H. fumigata

Binomial name
- Harutalcis fumigata (Bastelberger, 1909)

Synonyms
- Icterodes fumigata Bastelberger, 1909; Arichanna fumigata

= Harutalcis fumigata =

Species of moth

Harutalcis fumigata is a moth in the family Geometridae. It is found in Taiwan.
