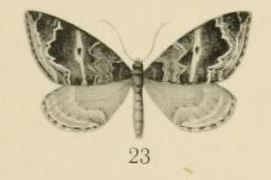
- Haplolabida monticolata

Scientific classification
- Domain: Eukaryota
- Kingdom: Animalia
- Phylum: Arthropoda
- Class: Insecta
- Order: Lepidoptera
- Family: Geometridae
- Subfamily: Larentiinae
- Genus: Haplolabida; D. S. Fletcher, 1958

= Haplolabida =

Genus of moths

Haplolabida is a genus of moths in the family Geometridae. It was described by David Stephen Fletcher in 1958.

Type species: Haplolabida monticolata (Aurivillius, 1910)

== Species ==
Species of this genus include:

- Haplolabida coaequata (Prout, 1935)
- Haplolabida diplodonta D. S. Fletcher, 1958
- Haplolabida inaequata (Walker, 1861)
- Haplolabida lacrimans Herbulot, 1970
- Haplolabida marojejensis Herbulot, 1963
- Haplolabida monticolata (Aurivillius, 1910)
- Haplolabida pauliani Viette, 1975
- Haplolabida sjostedti (Aurivillius, 1910)
- Haplolabida viettei Herbulot, 1970
