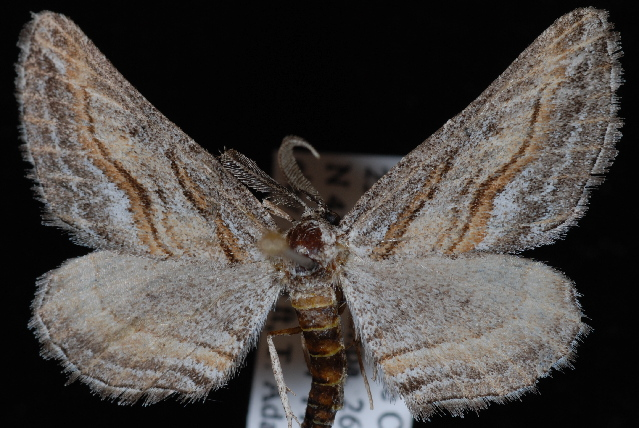
- Hulstina formosata

Scientific classification
- Kingdom: Animalia
- Phylum: Arthropoda
- Class: Insecta
- Order: Lepidoptera
- Family: Geometridae
- Tribe: Boarmiini
- Genus: Hulstina; Dyar, 1903

= Hulstina =

Genus of moths

Hulstina is a genus of moths in the family Geometridae erected by Harrison Gray Dyar Jr. in 1903.

== Species ==
- Hulstina aridata Barnes & Benjamin, 1929
- Hulstina exhumata (Swett, 1918)
- Hulstina formosata (Hulst, 1896)
- Hulstina grossbecki Rindge, 1970
- Hulstina imitatrix Rindge, 1970
- Hulstina nevadaria Brown, 1998
- Hulstina tanycraeros Rindge, 1970
- Hulstina wrightiaria (Hulst, 1888)
- Hulstina xera Rindge, 1970
