= Hemnypia =

Scientific classification
- Kingdom: Animalia
- Phylum: Arthropoda
- Clade: Pancrustacea
- Class: Insecta
- Order: Lepidoptera
- Family: Geometridae
- Genus: Hemnypia; McDunnough, 1941
- Species: H. baueri

Binomial name
- Hemnypia baueri McDunnough, 1941

Genus of moths

Hemnypia is a monotypic moth genus in the family Geometridae. Its only species, Hemnypia baueri, is found in the US state of California. Both the genus and the species were first described by James Halliday McDunnough in 1941.
