= Hyphalia =

Scientific classification
- Kingdom: Animalia
- Phylum: Arthropoda
- Clade: Pancrustacea
- Class: Insecta
- Order: Lepidoptera
- Family: Geometridae
- Genus: Hyphalia; Hübner, 1823
- Species: H. phylira

Binomial name
- Hyphalia phylira Cramer, 1777

Genus of moths

Hyphal is a monotypic moth genus in the family Geometridae erected by Jacob Hübner in 1823. Its only species, Hyphalia phylira, was first described by Pieter Cramer in 1777. It is found in Suriname.
