= Haplolabida lacrimans =

Scientific classification
- Domain: Eukaryota
- Kingdom: Animalia
- Phylum: Arthropoda
- Class: Insecta
- Order: Lepidoptera
- Family: Geometridae
- Genus: Haplolabida
- Species: H. lacrimans

Binomial name
- Haplolabida lacrimans Herbulot, 1970

Species of moth

Haplolabida lacrimans is a species of moth of the family Geometridae first described by Claude Herbulot in 1970. It is found in northern Madagascar.

This species looks close to Haplolabida marojejensis, described by Herbulot in 1963. The length of its forewings is 14 millimetres (0.55 in).
