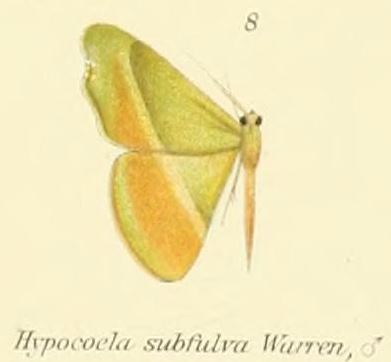
- Hypocoela subfulva

Scientific classification
- Kingdom: Animalia
- Phylum: Arthropoda
- Clade: Pancrustacea
- Class: Insecta
- Order: Lepidoptera
- Family: Geometridae
- Subfamily: Geometrinae
- Genus: Hypocoela; Warren, 1897

= Hypocoela =

Genus of moths

Hypocoela is a genus of moths in the family Geometridae described by Warren in 1897.

== Species ==
- Hypocoela abstrusa Herbulot, 1956
- Hypocoela amplipennis Herbulot, 1986
- Hypocoela angularis Herbulot, 1956
- Hypocoela camillae Herbulot, 1996
- Hypocoela drepana L. B. Prout, 1925
- Hypocoela dubiefi Viette, 1979
- Hypocoela fasciata Herbulot, 1956
- Hypocoela herbuloti Viette, 1971
- Hypocoela humidaria (Swinhoe, 1904)
- Hypocoela infracta Herbulot, 1956
- Hypocoela libertalia Viette, 1980
- Hypocoela lurida Herbulot, 1956
- Hypocoela magica Herbulot, 1956
- Hypocoela mannophora L. B. Prout, 1932
- Hypocoela peyrierasi Viette, 1978
- Hypocoela saturnina Herbulot, 1956
- Hypocoela sogai Viette, 1978
- Hypocoela spodozona L. B. Prout, 1925
- Hypocoela subfulva Warren, 1897
- Hypocoela tornifusca Herbulot, 1970
- Hypocoela turpisaria (Swinhoe, 1904)
