= Hypephyra =

Scientific classification
- Kingdom: Animalia
- Phylum: Arthropoda
- Class: Insecta
- Order: Lepidoptera
- Family: Geometridae
- Genus: Hypephyra; Butler, 1889

Genus of moths

Hypephyra is a genus of moths in the family Geometridae.

== Species ==
- Hypephyra brunneiplaga (Swinhoe, 1902)
- Hypephyra charitopis Prout
- Hypephyra speciosa Yazaki
- Hypephyra terrosa Butler
- Hypephyra undilinea Bastelberger
