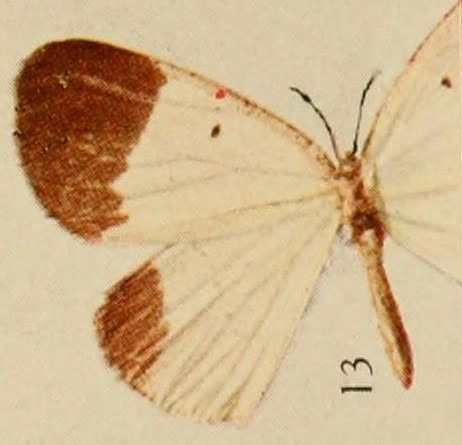
- Melinoessa pieridaria

Scientific classification
- Kingdom: Animalia
- Phylum: Arthropoda
- Class: Insecta
- Order: Lepidoptera
- Family: Geometridae
- Subfamily: Ennominae
- Genus: Melinoessa; Herrich-Schäffer, 1855

Synonyms
- Hyphenophora Warren, 1894; Obrussa Saalmüller, 1891; Rhamidava Walker, 1863; Timana Walker, 1869; Traina Walker, 1869

= Melinoessa =

Genus of moths

Melinoessa is a genus of moths in the family Geometridae erected by Gottlieb August Wilhelm Herrich-Schäffer in 1855.

== Species ==
Some species of this genus are:

- Melinoessa aemonia (Swinhoe, 1904)
- Melinoessa amplissimata (Walker, 1863)
- Melinoessa argenteomaculata (Strand, 1918)
- Melinoessa asteria L. B. Prout, 1934
- Melinoessa aureola L. B. Prout, 1934
- Melinoessa catenata (Saalmüller, 1891)
- Melinoessa croesaria Herrich-Schäffer, 1855
- Melinoessa eurycrossa L. B. Prout, 1934
- Melinoessa fulvescens L. B. Prout, 1916
- Melinoessa guenoti Herbulot, 1981
- Melinoessa horni L. B. Prout, 1922
- Melinoessa midas L. B. Prout, 1922
- Melinoessa molybdauges L. B. Prout, 1927
- Melinoessa palumbata (Warren, 1894)
- Melinoessa pauper Warren, 1901
- Melinoessa perlimbata (Guenée, 1857)
- Melinoessa pieridaria (Holland, 1920)
- Melinoessa sodaliata (Walker, 1863)
- Melinoessa stellata (Butler, 1878)
- Melinoessa straminata (Walker, 1869)
- Melinoessa subalbida Warren, 1905
- Melinoessa tanyglochis L. B. Prout, 1928
- Melinoessa tessmanni (Gaede, 1917)
- Melinoessa torquilinea L. B. Prout, 1916
