= Hosseusia (fungus) =

Scientific classification
- Kingdom: Fungi
- Division: Ascomycota
- Class: Lecanoromycetes
- Genus: Hosseusia; Gyeln. (1940)
- Species: H. gertrudiana

Binomial name
- Hosseusia gertrudiana Gyeln. (1940)

Single-species lichen genus

Hosseusia is a fungal genus of uncertain classification in the Lecanoromycetes. The genus remains poorly understood, with no genetic data available and its proper family placement still uncertain. The single species, Hosseusia gertrudiana, is a fruticose lichen that forms tiny black patches just a few millimetres across, composed of short upright branches that flatten toward their tips. It is known only from granite rocks in a single location in Córdoba Province, Argentina, where it was collected in the early 20th century.

== Taxonomy ==
Vilmos Kőfaragó-Gyelnik introduced Hosseusia as a new genus in 1940 and designated Hosseusia gertrudiana as the type species. He named the genus in honour of Carl Curt Hosseus of Córdoba, Argentina, who collected the lichen, and the species in memory of Mrs. Hosseus, his wife, who had assisted on field trips and died in 1935. In the protologue Gyelnik placed the genus near the family Pannariaceae, but called that placement doubtful because no fruiting bodies were known. He even noted that, should fertile material be found, the lichen might merit a family of its own.

As of 2017, no molecular data were available for the genus. Reflecting that uncertainty, Robert Lücking and colleagues treated Hosseusia as incertae sedis within the Lecanoromycetes and remarked that its original placement in Pannariaceae was erroneous. Doubts about a pannariaceous affinity had already been voiced by Stefan Ekman and Per Magnus Jørgensen, who considered the taxon's identity unknown until the type could be recovered and judged it hardly a member of that family. The 2024 "Outline of Fungi" follows this Lecanoromycetes incertae sedis placement.

== Description ==
Hosseusia forms a minute fruticose thallus—a tiny, shrub-like body—of short, erect branches that coalesce into black patches about 2–10 mm across. Branches are cylindrical at the base (0.2–0.3 mm thick) and flatten toward the tips into narrow, ribbon-like lobes up to 1–1.2 mm wide. The surface is opaque and epruinose (lacking a powdery frosting), the thallus does not swell when wet, and attachment to the rock is by a small umbilicus, a navel-like holdfast. Vegetative propagules are absent: the species lacks both isidia and soredia.

The outer cortex is paraplectenchymatous (a compact, tissue-like layer) about 38–40 micrometres (μm) thick, with oval cortical cells whose walls are roughly 1.5–2 μm thick. The photobiont is Nostoc-like cyanobacteria, with pale bluish cells 4–6 μm across; the algal layer is extremely thin and may be absent, and algal cells can also occur within cortical cells. The medulla is very loose and reticulate, sometimes hollow in the centre or pierced by large cavities; its hyphae are colourless, sparsely branched, septate, and about 3 μm thick.

No sexual or asexual fruiting bodies were seen in the type material: apothecia and pycnidia were not observed, and cephalodia are likewise unknown.

== Habitat and distribution ==
Gyelnik recorded Hosseusia gertrudiana on siliceous rock, specifically granite, where it can form small stands. The type locality is Quebrada Negra ("Black Gorge"), Córdoba Province, Argentina. The original account does not list additional sites.
