= Hyalochlora =

Scientific classification
- Kingdom: Animalia
- Phylum: Arthropoda
- Clade: Pancrustacea
- Class: Insecta
- Order: Lepidoptera
- Family: Geometridae
- Subfamily: Geometrinae
- Genus: Hyalochlora; Prout, 1912

Genus of moths

Hyalochlora is a genus of moths in the family Geometridae.

== Species ==
Hyalochlora contains the following species:

- Hyalochlora antolodoxa Prout, 1932
- Hyalochlora nadia Herbulot, 1976
- Hyalochlora splendens (Druce, 1898)
