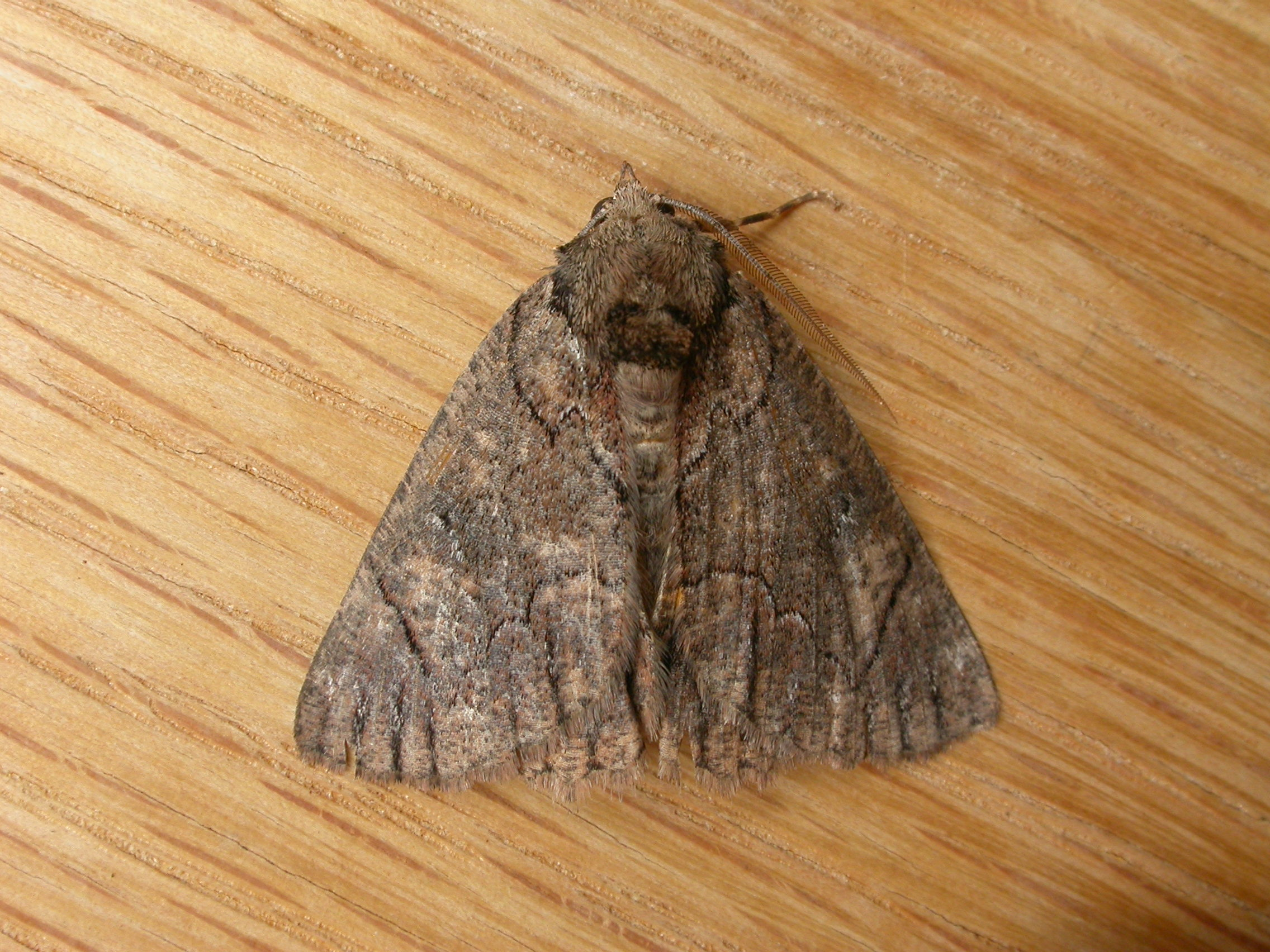

Scientific classification
- Kingdom: Animalia
- Phylum: Arthropoda
- Class: Insecta
- Order: Lepidoptera
- Family: Geometridae
- Genus: Heliomystis; Meyrick, 1888
- Species: H. electrica

Binomial name
- Heliomystis electrica Meyrick, 1888

= Heliomystis =

Genus of moths

Heliomystis is a monotypic moth genus in the family Geometridae. Its only species, Heliomystis electrica, the electric moth, is found in the southern half of Australia (New South Wales, Queensland, South Australia, Western Australia and Tasmania). Both the genus and species were first described by Edward Meyrick in 1888.

The larvae feed on Eucalyptus dives and Eucalyptus obliqua.
