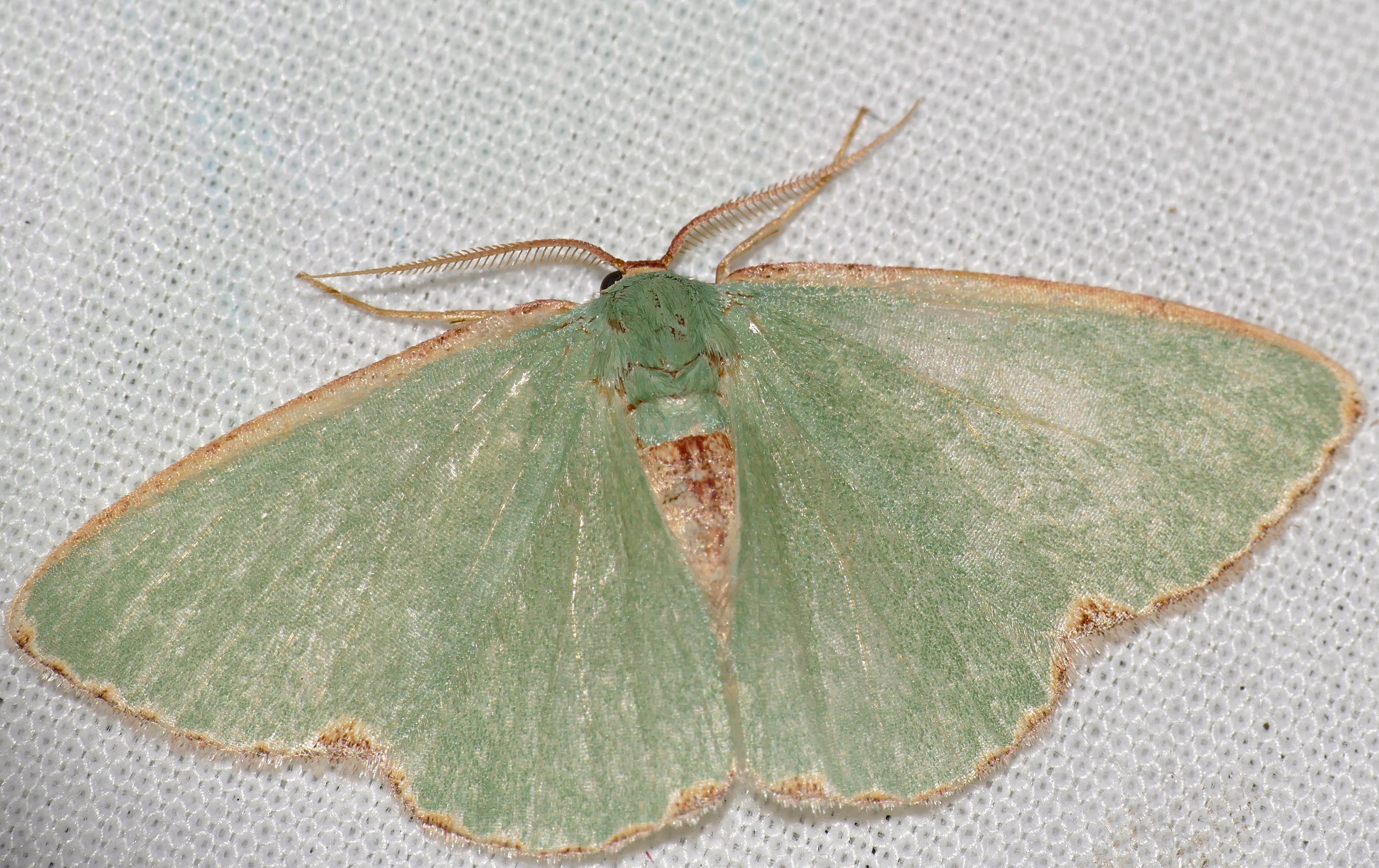
- Heterorachis devocata

Scientific classification
- Kingdom: Animalia
- Phylum: Arthropoda
- Class: Insecta
- Order: Lepidoptera
- Family: Geometridae
- Subfamily: Geometrinae
- Genus: Heterorachis; Warren, 1898

Type species
- Geometra devocata Walker, 1861

= Heterorachis =

Genus of moths

Heterorachis is a genus of moths in the family Geometridae described by Warren in 1898.

== Species ==
- Heterorachis abdita Herbulot, 1955
- Heterorachis acuta Herbulot, 1955
- Heterorachis amplior Herbulot, 1955
- Heterorachis asyllaria (Swinhoe, 1904)
- Heterorachis carpenteri (Prout, 1915)
- Heterorachis conradti Prout, 1938
- Heterorachis defossa Herbulot, 1955
- Heterorachis despoliata Prout, 1916
- Heterorachis devocata (Walker, 1861)
- Heterorachis diaphana (Warren, 1899)
- Heterorachis dichorda Prout, 1915
- Heterorachis diphrontis Prout, 1922
- Heterorachis disconotata Prout, 1916
- Heterorachis extrema Herbulot, 1996
- Heterorachis fulcrata Herbulot, 1996
- Heterorachis furcata Herbulot, 1965
- Heterorachis fuscoterminata Prout, 1915
- Heterorachis gloriola Thierry-Mieg, 1915
- Heterorachis haploa (Prout, 1912)
- Heterorachis harpifera Herbulot, 1955
- Heterorachis idmon Fawcett, 1916
- Heterorachis insolens (Prout, 1917)
- Heterorachis insueta Prout, 1922
- Heterorachis lunatimargo (Prout, 1911)
- Heterorachis malachitica (Saalmüller, 1880)
- Heterorachis melanophragma Prout, 1918
- Heterorachis perviridis (Prout, 1912)
- Heterorachis platti Janse, 1935
- Heterorachis prouti (Bethune-Baker, 1913)
- Heterorachis reducta Herbulot, 1955
- Heterorachis simplicissima (Prout, 1912)
- Heterorachis soaindrana Herbulot, 1972
- Heterorachis suarezi Herbulot, 1965
- Heterorachis tanala Herbulot, 1965
- Heterorachis tornata Prout, 1922
- Heterorachis trita Prout, 1922
- Heterorachis tsara Viette, 1971
- Heterorachis turlini Herbulot, 1977
- Heterorachis ultramarina Herbulot, 1968
- Heterorachis viettei Herbulot, 1955
