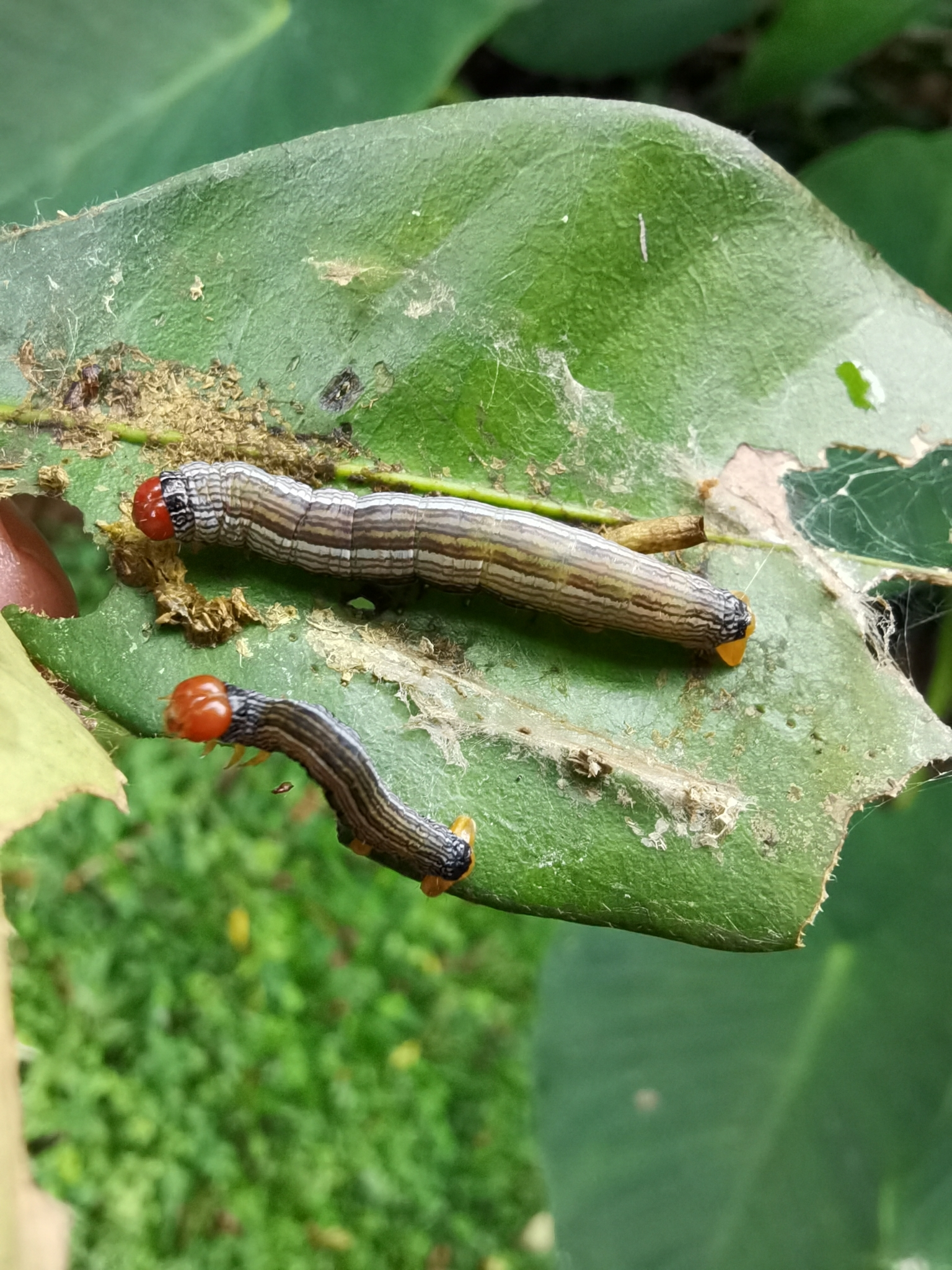
- Himeromima aulis larvae

Scientific classification
- Kingdom: Animalia
- Phylum: Arthropoda
- Clade: Pancrustacea
- Class: Insecta
- Order: Lepidoptera
- Family: Geometridae
- Subfamily: Ennominae
- Genus: Himeromima

= Himeromima =

Genus of moths

Himeromima is a genus of moths in the family Geometridae.
