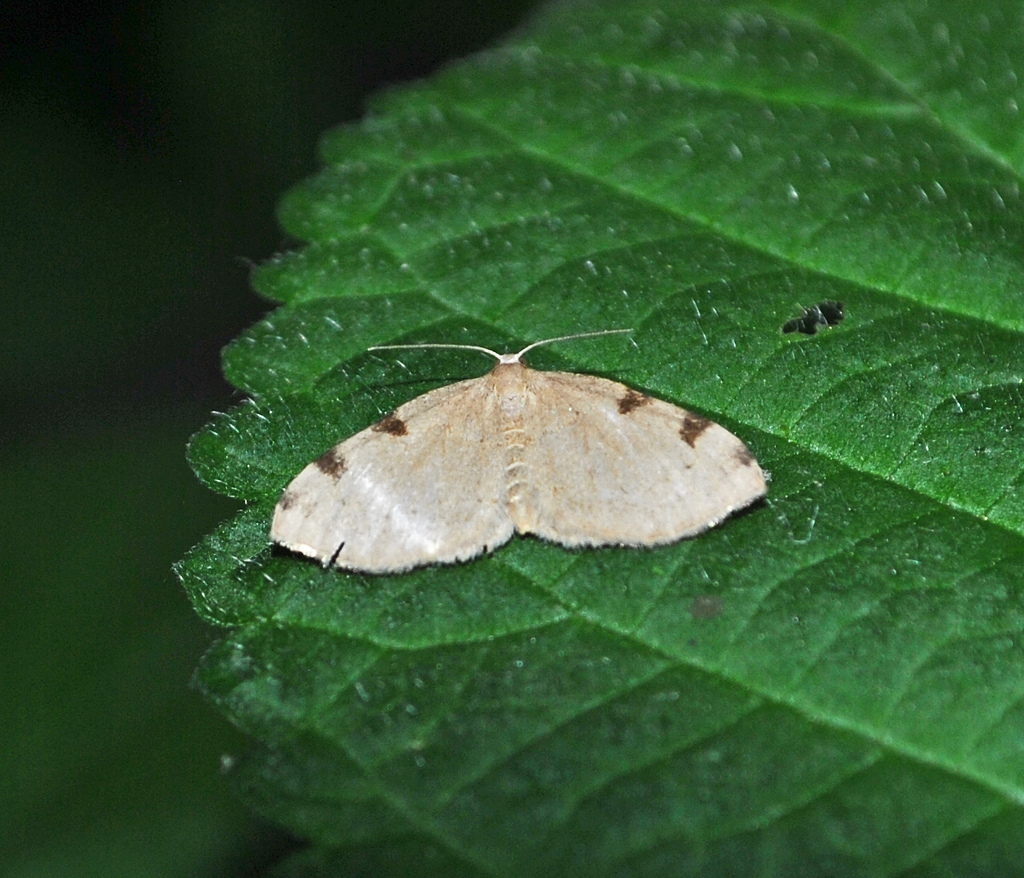
- Heterophleps triguttaria

Scientific classification
- Kingdom: Animalia
- Phylum: Arthropoda
- Class: Insecta
- Order: Lepidoptera
- Family: Geometridae
- Subfamily: Larentiinae
- Genus: Heterophleps; Herrich-Schäffer, [1854]

= Heterophleps =

Genus of moths

Heterophleps is a genus of moths in the family Geometridae, first discovered by Gottlieb August Wilhelm Herrich-Schäffer in 1854.

== Species ==
- Heterophleps bicommata (Warren, 1893)
- Heterophleps confusa Wilerman, 1911
- Heterophleps euthygramma Wehrli, 1932
- Heterophleps fusca (Butler, 1878)
- Heterophleps inusitata Li, Jiang & Han, 2012
- Heterophleps morensata (Hulst, 1896)
- Heterophleps ocyptaria (Swinhoe, 1893)
- Heterophleps refusaria (Walker, 1861)
- Heterophleps triguttaria Herrich-Schäffer, [1854]
