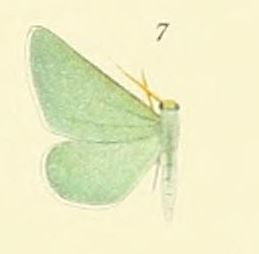

Scientific classification
- Kingdom: Animalia
- Phylum: Arthropoda
- Clade: Pancrustacea
- Class: Insecta
- Order: Lepidoptera
- Family: Geometridae
- Genus: Hierochthonia; Prout, 1912

= Hierochthonia =

Genus of moths

Hierochthonia is a genus of moths in the family Geometridae described by Prout in 1912.

== Species ==
- Hierochthonia alexandraria Prout, 1912
- Hierochthonia petitaria (Christoph, 1887)
- Hierochthonia pulverata (Warren, 1901)
- Hierochthonia semitata (Püngeler, 1901)
