= Honorana =

Scientific classification
- Kingdom: Animalia
- Phylum: Arthropoda
- Clade: Pancrustacea
- Class: Insecta
- Order: Lepidoptera
- Family: Geometridae
- Genus: Honorana; Blanchard, 1852
- Species: H. notaturia

Binomial name
- Honorana notaturia Blanchard, 1852

Genus of moths

Honorana is a monotypic moth genus in the family Geometridae. Its only species is Honorana notaturia. Both the genus and species were first described by Blanchard in 1852.
