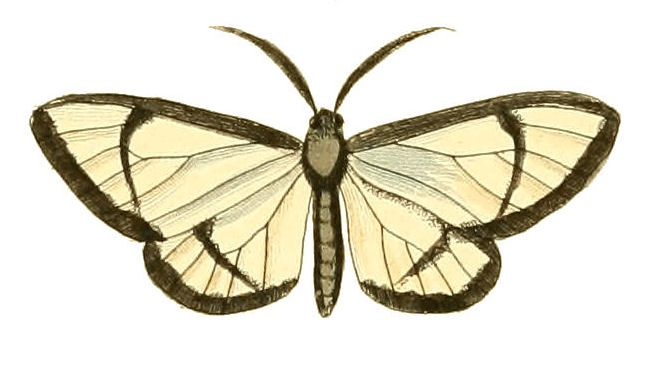
- Locha hyalina

Scientific classification
- Kingdom: Animalia
- Phylum: Arthropoda
- Class: Insecta
- Order: Lepidoptera
- Family: Geometridae
- Subfamily: Ennominae
- Genus: Locha; Walker, 1854

Synonyms
- Cadyanda Walker, 1856; Erycinopsis Felder in Felder & Rogenhofer, 1874; Hyalocampa Warren, 1900; Hyalopola Warren, 1904; Hyalospila Warren, 1894 (non Herrich-Schäffer, 1853: preoccupied)

= Locha =

Genus of moths

Locha is a moth genus in the family Geometridae erected by Francis Walker in 1854.

== Species ==
- Locha hyalaria (Herrich-Schäffer, [1855])
- Locha hyalina (Walker, 1854)
- Locha panopea (Thierry-Mieg, 1892)
- Locha phocusa (Druce, 1893)
- Locha posthumaria (Herrich-Schäffer, [1855])
