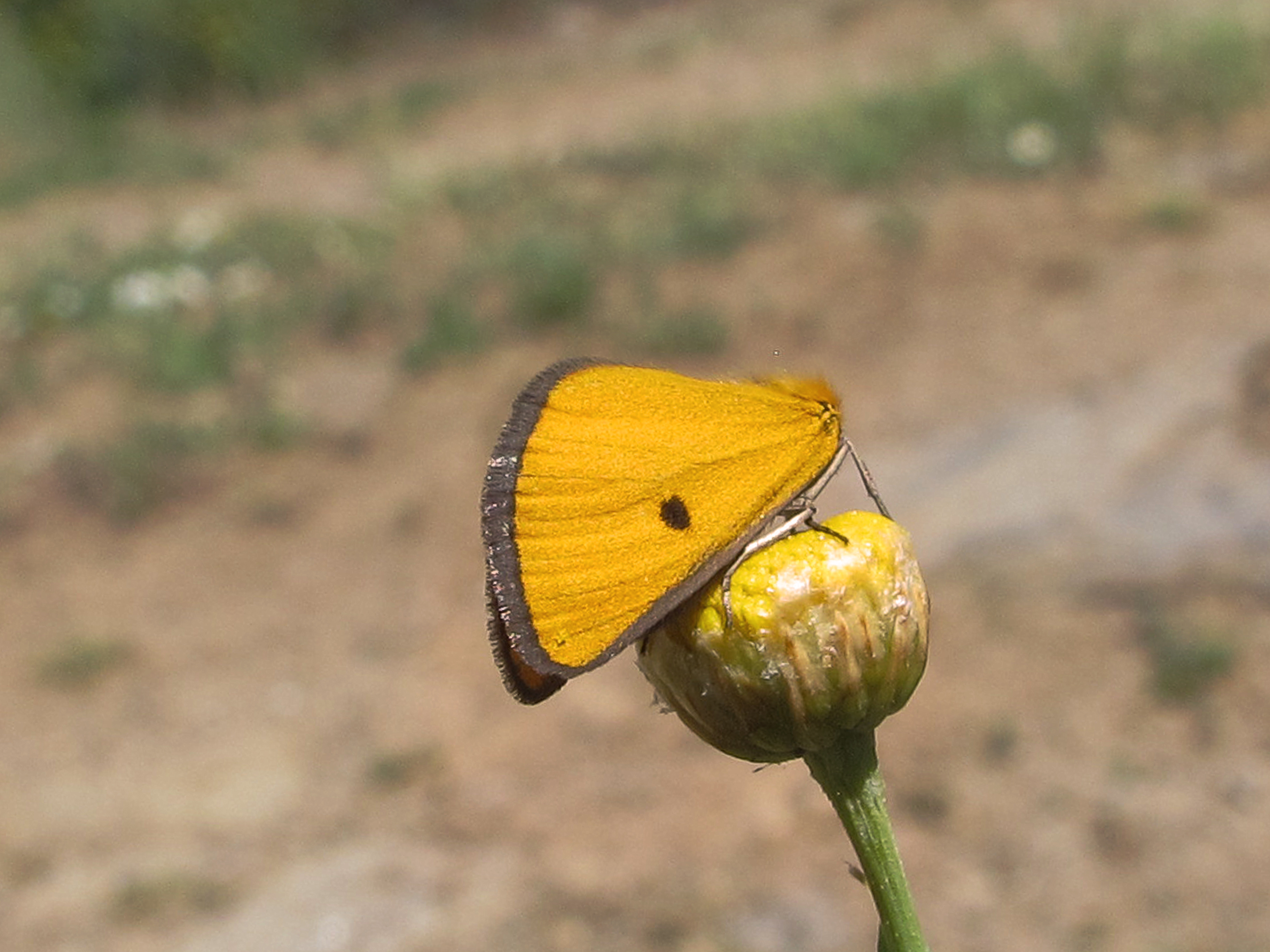
- Heliothea discoidaria

Scientific classification
- Kingdom: Animalia
- Phylum: Arthropoda
- Class: Insecta
- Order: Lepidoptera
- Family: Geometridae
- Genus: Heliothea; Boisduval, 1840

= Heliothea =

Genus of moths

Heliothea is a genus of moths in the family Geometridae erected by Jean Baptiste Boisduval in 1840.

== Species ==
- Heliothea discoidaria Boisduval, 1840 south-western Europe, Morocco
- Heliothea iliensis Alphéraky, 1883 Tien Shan mountains
