= Heterodisca =

Scientific classification
- Kingdom: Animalia
- Phylum: Arthropoda
- Clade: Pancrustacea
- Class: Insecta
- Order: Lepidoptera
- Family: Geometridae
- Subfamily: Ennominae
- Genus: Heterodisca; Warren, 1896

Synonyms
- Heterodisca Fleming, 1825 (Polychaeta) – nomen inquirendum; Heterodisca Fleming, 1818 (Polychaeta)

Genus of moths

Heterodisca is a genus of moths in the family Geometridae.

== Taxonomy ==
Koçak & Kemal (2005) have introduced Yucelaskinia as the replacement name for Heterodisca, pointing out that Heterodisca Warren, 1896 is a junior synonym of Heterodisca Fleming, 1818. The Catalogue of Life and Global Lepidoptera Index treat Heterodisca Warren, 1896 as a valid name.

== Species ==
There are four recognized species:

- Heterodisca castanea Warren, 1906
- Heterodisca flammea Warren, 1907
- Heterodisca ignea Warren, 1903
- Heterodisca scardamiata Warren, 1896
