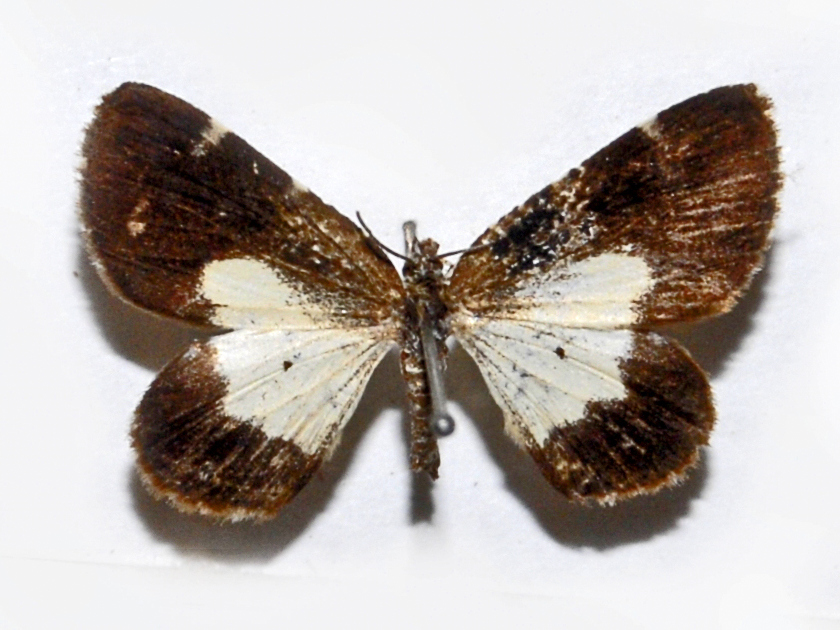
- Heterusia conduplicaria on display at the Museo Civico di Storia Naturale di Trieste

Scientific classification
- Kingdom: Animalia
- Phylum: Arthropoda
- Clade: Pancrustacea
- Class: Insecta
- Order: Lepidoptera
- Family: Geometridae
- Subfamily: Larentiinae
- Tribe: Heterusiini
- Genus: Heterusia; Hübner, 1831

Synonyms
- Scordylia Guenée, 1857

= Heterusia =

Genus of moths

Heterusia is a genus of moths in the family Geometridae. The genus is confined to the Americas.

== Species ==
There are 87 accepted species:

- Heterusia adventa (Prout, 1934)
- Heterusia amita Dognin, 1909
- Heterusia atalantata (Guenée, [1858])
- Heterusia barbara Dognin, 1900
- Heterusia barrioso Ureta, 1956
- Heterusia binotata Warren, 1904
- Heterusia brumalis Schaus, 1901
- Heterusia brunonaria (Maassen, 1890)
- Heterusia captata (Dognin, 1893)
- Heterusia ceresia (Druce, 1893)
- Heterusia coecata Warren, 1905
- Heterusia coliadata (Walker, 1862)
- Heterusia colmala (Thierry-Mieg, 1893)
- Heterusia columbi (Thierry-Mieg, 1893)
- Heterusia combana Druce, 1893
- Heterusia conduplicaria Hübner, [1831]
- Heterusia conflictata (Guenée, [1858])
- Heterusia conna Druce, 1893
- Heterusia consobrina Warren, 1907
- Heterusia creusa (Druce, 1893)
- Heterusia crossa (Druce, 1893)
- Heterusia cruciata (Staudinger, 1894)
- Heterusia declivis Dognin, 1911
- Heterusia deprivata (Walker, 1862)
- Heterusia dividata Snellen, 1878
- Heterusia eruptiva Bastelberger, 1908
- Heterusia fallax Bastelberger, 1907
- Heterusia fidoniata (Staudinger, 1894)
- Heterusia fidonioides Bastelberger, 1911
- Heterusia flavocellata Warren, 1897
- Heterusia fractifascia Warren, 1904
- Heterusia fragilis Dognin, 1909
- Heterusia funebris Warren, 1897
- Heterusia gratulata (Guenée, [1858])
- Heterusia hesperiaria (Walker, 1862)
- Heterusia hippomenata (Snellen, 1874)
- Heterusia hippomenatoides (Dognin, 1895)
- Heterusia humeraria (Walker, 1862)
- Heterusia hypophlebica (Prout, 1923)
- Heterusia jacintina (Thierry-Mieg, 1893)
- Heterusia jelskiaria Oberthür, 1881
- Heterusia lacrymosa (Thierry-Mieg, 1896)
- Heterusia lymnadoides (Prout, 1931)
- Heterusia maculata Dognin, 1907
- Heterusia mendaciaria (Walker, 1862)
- Heterusia merla (Staudinger, 1894)
- Heterusia merula (Thierry-Mieg, 1893)
- Heterusia monospilata (Snellen, 1874)
- Heterusia morvena (Thierry-Mieg, 1910)
- Heterusia morvula (Staudinger, 1894)
- Heterusia nondescripta (Warren, 1901)
- Heterusia obtusa Dognin, 1911
- Heterusia ochrozona Felder & Rogenhofer, 1875
- Heterusia ovaliplaga Warren, 1905
- Heterusia particolor Warren, 1897
- Heterusia partitata (Guenée, [1858])
- Heterusia picata Dognin, 1904
- Heterusia placida Druce, 1893
- Heterusia plagia (Druce, 1893)
- Heterusia plenilimes Warren, 1907
- Heterusia polymela (Druce, 1893)
- Heterusia praeangulata Bastelberger, 1908
- Heterusia primulimacula (Prout, 1923)
- Heterusia proana (Druce, 1893)
- Heterusia proanodes Dognin, 1914
- Heterusia promenea (Druce, 1893)
- Heterusia prusa (Druce, 1893)
- Heterusia prusioides Dognin, 1909
- Heterusia pyriformis Bastelberger, 1911
- Heterusia quadruplicaria Geyer, 1832
- Heterusia repagulata Bastelberger, 1908
- Heterusia rosgala (Thierry-Mieg, 1896)
- Heterusia rubrimarmorata Dognin, 1902
- Heterusia rufifimbria Dognin, 1903
- Heterusia salvini (Butler, 1875)
- Heterusia separata Warren, 1907
- Heterusia simulatrix Dognin, 1907
- Heterusia sinuosa Felder & Rogenhofer, 1875
- Heterusia stoltzmannaria Oberthür, 1881
- Heterusia subangulata (Maassen, 1890)
- Heterusia subvermiculata Dognin, 1911
- Heterusia thierryi (Bastelberger, 1908)
- Heterusia tiricia (Dognin, 1893)
- Heterusia triflavata Dognin, 1903
- Heterusia trifoliata Warren, 1907
- Heterusia unanimaria (Walker, 1862)
- Heterusia zeritis Felder & Rogenhofer, 1875
