= Hirasa =

Scientific classification
- Kingdom: Animalia
- Phylum: Arthropoda
- Class: Insecta
- Order: Lepidoptera
- Family: Geometridae
- Genus: Hirasa; Moore, 1888

Synonyms
- Hirasichlora Wehrli, 1951; Hirasodes Warren, 1899

Genus of moths

Hirasa is a geometer moth genus of tribe Gnophini in the subfamily Ennominae. The genus was erected by Frederic Moore in 1888.

Species include:

- Hirasa pauperus (Butler, 1881)
- Hirasa scripturaria (Walker, 1866)
- Hirasa theuropides (Oberthür, 1891)
