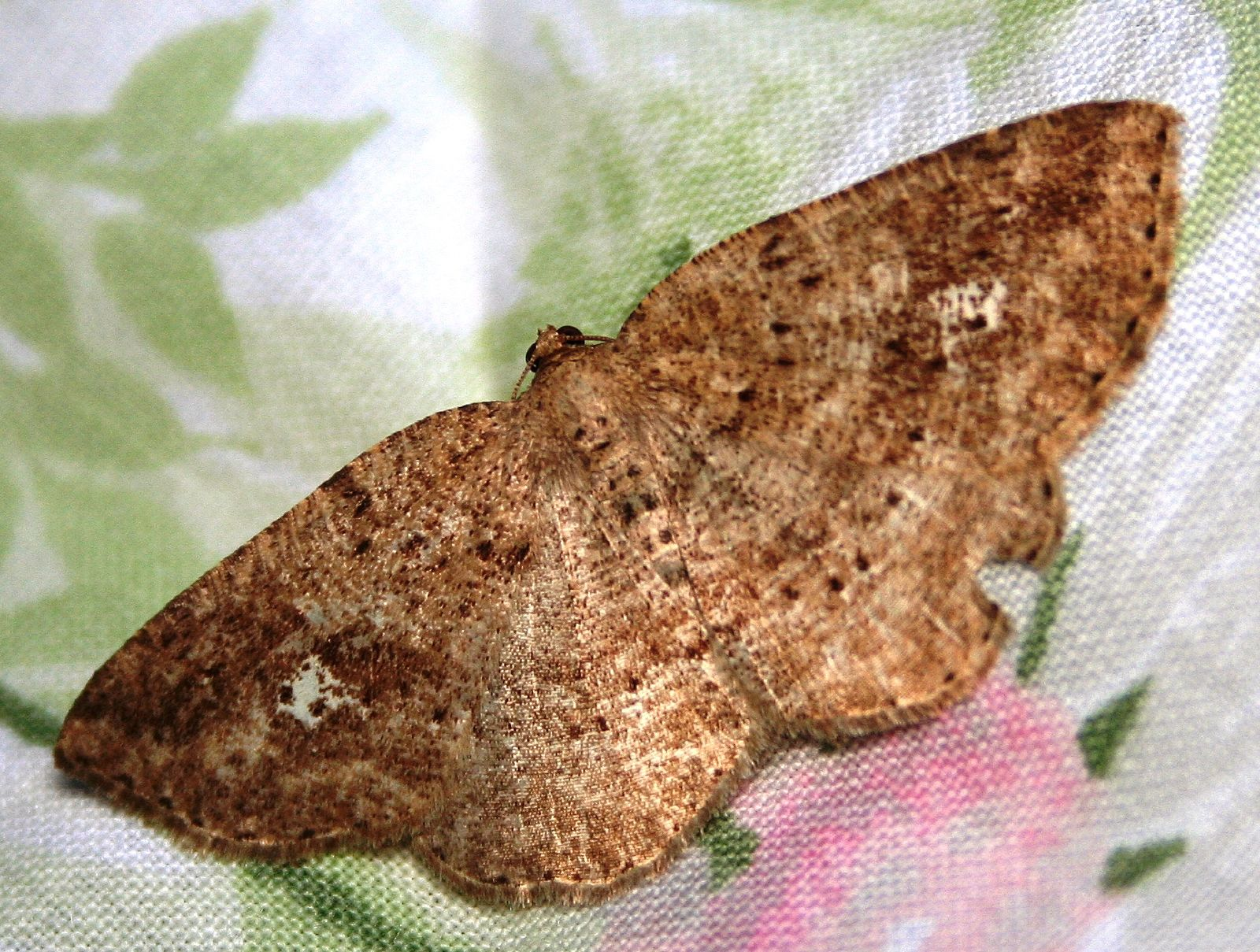

Scientific classification
- Kingdom: Animalia
- Phylum: Arthropoda
- Class: Insecta
- Order: Lepidoptera
- Family: Geometridae
- Tribe: Lithinini
- Genus: Homochlodes; Hulst, 1896

= Homochlodes =

Genus of moths

Homochlodes is a genus of moths in the family Geometridae described by George Duryea Hulst in 1896.

== Species ==
- Homochlodes disconventa (Walker, 1860)
- Homochlodes fritillaria (Guenée, 1857)
- Homochlodes lactispargaria (Walker, 1861)
