= Hylemera =

Scientific classification
- Kingdom: Animalia
- Phylum: Arthropoda
- Class: Insecta
- Order: Lepidoptera
- Family: Geometridae
- Genus: Hylemera; Butler, 1878

Type species
- Hylemera tenuis Butler, 1878

Synonyms
- Pseudocrocinis Swinhoe, 1904

Genus of moths

Hylemera is a genus of moths in the family Geometridae erected by Arthur Gardiner Butler in 1878.

== Species ==
Some species of this genus are:

- Hylemera aetionaria (Swinhoe, 1904)
- Hylemera altitudina Viette, 1970
- Hylemera altivolans Viette, 1970
- Hylemera andriai Viette, 1970
- Hylemera azalea (Prout, 1925)
- Hylemera butleri Viette, 1970
- Hylemera cadoreli Viette, 1970
- Hylemera candida Butler, 1882
- Hylemera cunea Viette, 1970
- Hylemera decaryi Viette, 1970
- Hylemera ecstasa Viette, 1970
- Hylemera elegans Viette, 1970
- Hylemera euphrantica (Prout, 1932)
- Hylemera fletcheri Viette, 1970
- Hylemera fragilis Butler, 1879
- Hylemera griveaudi Viette, 1970
- Hylemera herbuloti Viette, 1970
- Hylemera hiemalis Viette, 1970
- Hylemera hypostigmica (Prout, 1925)
- Hylemera instabilis Viette, 1970
- Hylemera laurentensis Viette, 1970
- Hylemera lemuria Viette, 1970
- Hylemera lichenea Viette, 1970
- Hylemera mabillei Viette, 1970
- Hylemera malagasy Viette, 1970
- Hylemera marmorata Viette, 1970
- Hylemera nivea Butler, 1882
- Hylemera pauliani Viette, 1970
- Hylemera perrieri Viette, 1970
- Hylemera plana (Butler, 1879)
- Hylemera prouti Viette, 1970
- Hylemera puella Butler, 1879
- Hylemera rebuti (Poujade, 1889)
- Hylemera roseidaria Viette, 1970
- Hylemera sogai Viette, 1970
- Hylemera sparsipuncta Viette, 1970
- Hylemera subaridea Viette, 1970
- Hylemera teleutaea (Prout, 1925)
- Hylemera tenuis Butler, 1878
- Hylemera vinacea Viette, 1970
