= Hygrochroma =

Scientific classification
- Kingdom: Animalia
- Phylum: Arthropoda
- Class: Insecta
- Order: Lepidoptera
- Family: Geometridae
- Genus: Hygrochroma

Genus of moths

Hygrochroma is a genus of moths in the family Geometridae.

== Species ==
- Hygrochroma xitle Garzón-Orduña, 2023
