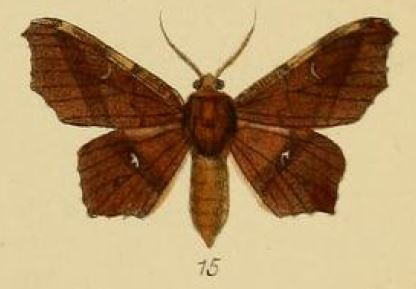
- Hyalornis docta

Scientific classification
- Domain: Eukaryota
- Kingdom: Animalia
- Phylum: Arthropoda
- Class: Insecta
- Order: Lepidoptera
- Family: Geometridae
- Subfamily: Ennominae
- Genus: Hyalornis; Warren, 1894

= Hyalornis =

Genus of moths

Hyalornis is a genus of moths in the family Geometridae described by Warren in 1894.

== Species ==
- Hyalornis docta (Schaus & Clemens, 1893)
- Hyalornis livida Herbulot, 1973
