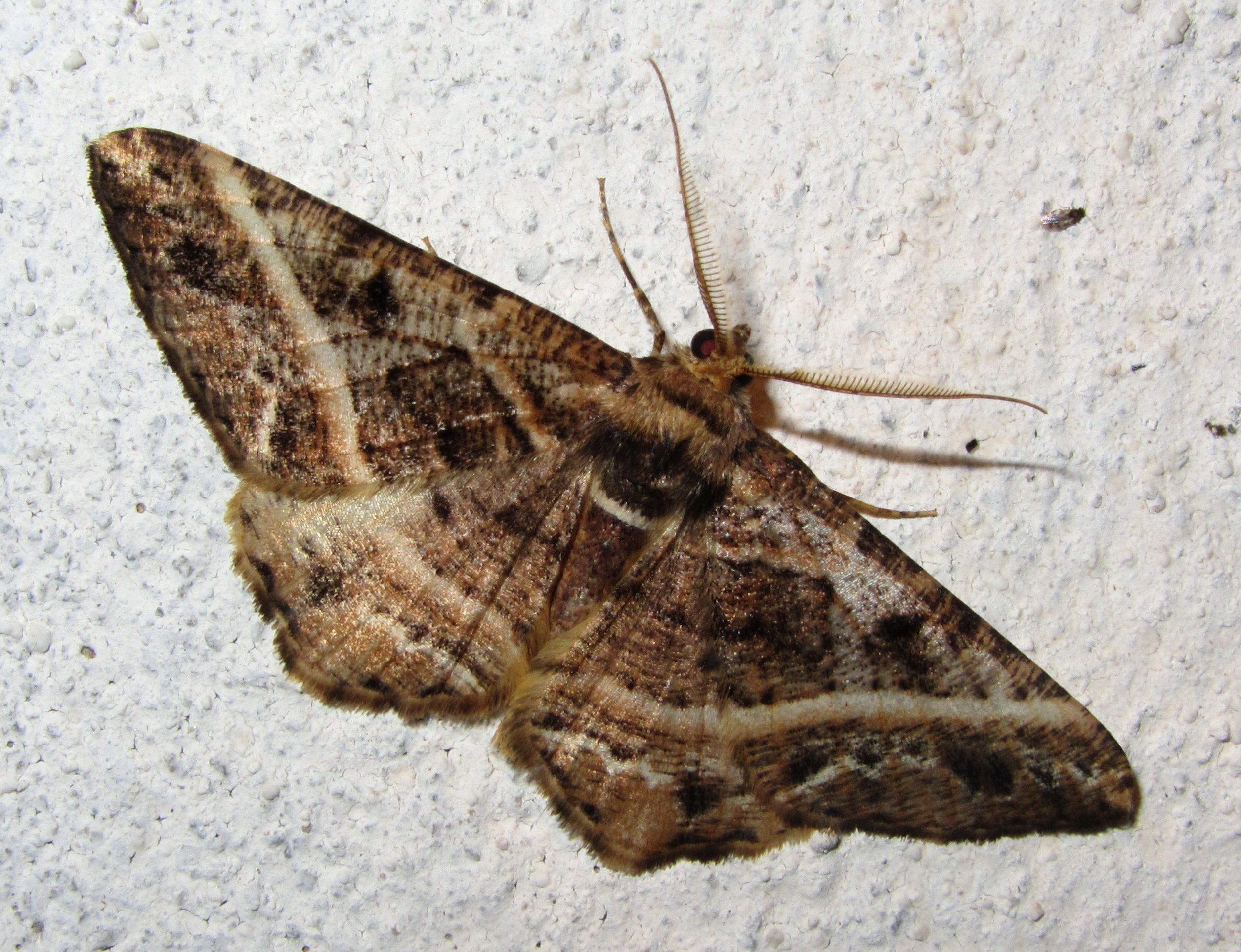

Scientific classification
- Kingdom: Animalia
- Phylum: Arthropoda
- Clade: Pancrustacea
- Class: Insecta
- Order: Lepidoptera
- Family: Geometridae
- Subfamily: Ennominae
- Genus: Harutalcis; Sato, 1993

= Harutalcis =

Genus of moths

Harutalcis is a genus of moths in the family Geometridae described by Sato in 1993.

== Species ==
- Harutalcis atrostipata (Walker, 1862)
- Harutalcis fumigata (Bastelberger, 1909)
- Harutalcis glaucodisca (Swinhoe, 1894)
- Harutalcis godavariensis Sato, 1993
- Harutalcis megaspilaria (Moore, 1868)
- Harutalcis vialis (Moore, 1888)
