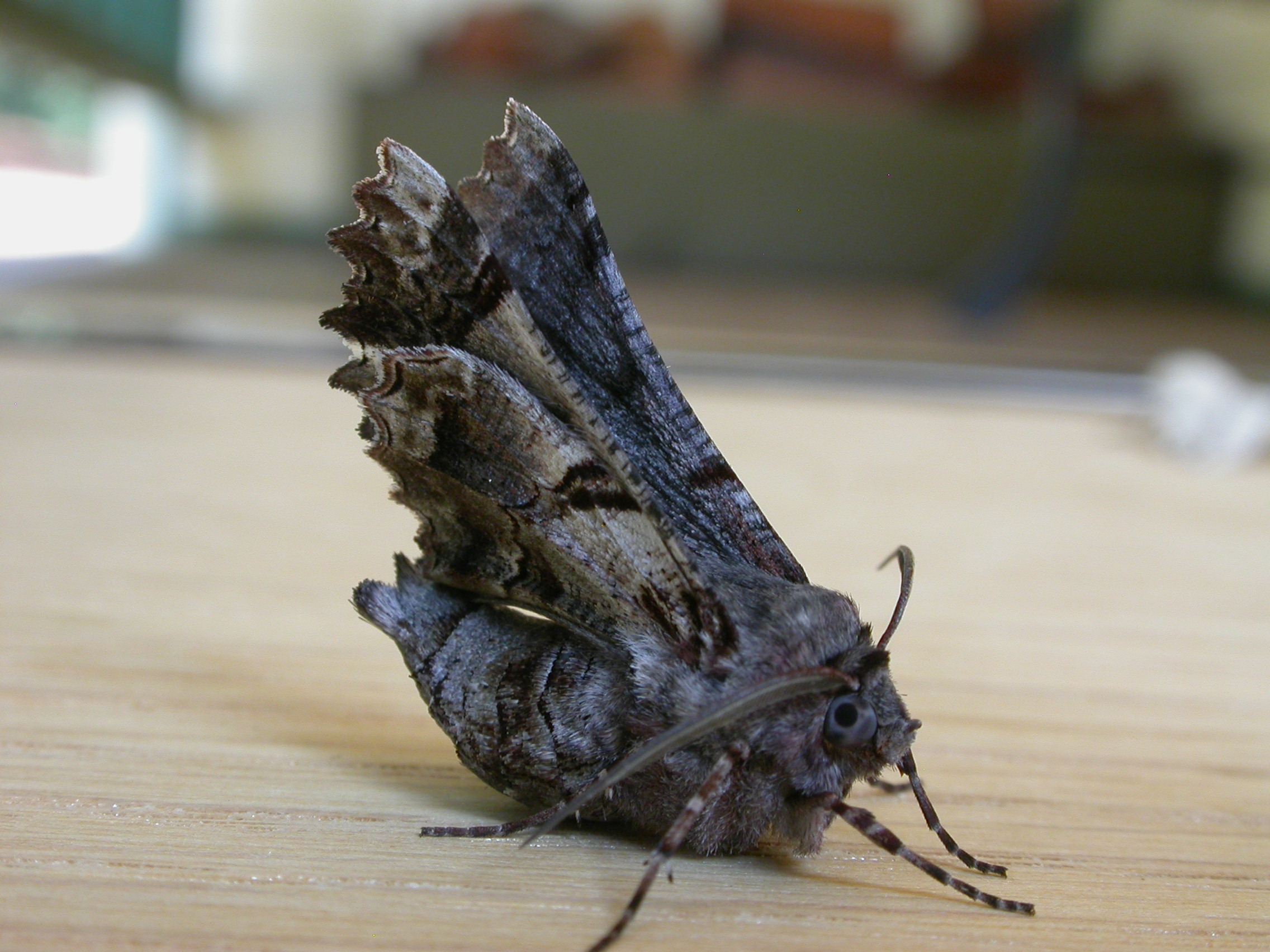
- Hypographa phlegetonaria

Scientific classification
- Kingdom: Animalia
- Phylum: Arthropoda
- Class: Insecta
- Order: Lepidoptera
- Family: Geometridae
- Subfamily: Oenochrominae
- Genus: Hypographa; Guenée, 1857

= Hypographa =

Genus of moths

Hypographa is a genus of moths in the family Geometridae erected by Achille Guenée in 1857.

== Species ==
- Hypographa epiodes Turner, 1930
- Hypographa aristarcha Prout, 1910
- Hypographa phlegetonaria Guenée, 1857
- Hypographa reflua Lucas, 1898
