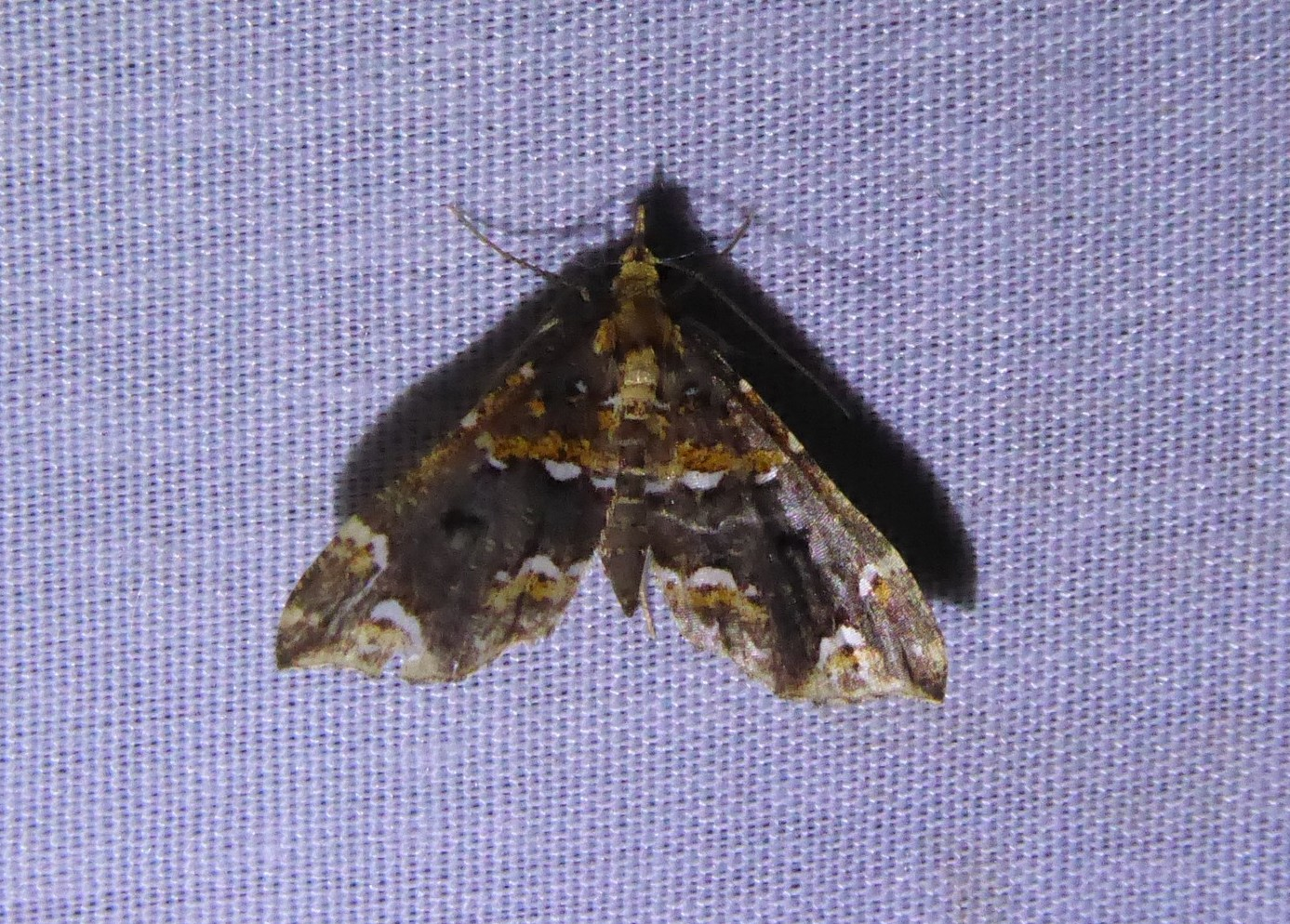

Scientific classification
- Kingdom: Animalia
- Phylum: Arthropoda
- Class: Insecta
- Order: Lepidoptera
- Family: Geometridae
- Tribe: Hydriomenini
- Genus: Psaliodes; Guenée, 1857

Synonyms
- Hydara Walker, 1859; Alydda Walker, 1861; Hypolepis Warren, 1904

= Psaliodes =

Genus of moths

Psaliodes is a genus of moths in the family Geometridae. The genus was erected by Achille Guenée in 1857.

== Species ==
- Psaliodes albifascia Dognin, 1911
- Psaliodes albifulva Warren, 1909
- Psaliodes albistriga Warren, 1904
- Psaliodes aliena Dognin, 1911
- Psaliodes analiplaga Warren, 1904
- Psaliodes angustata Bastelberger, 1907
- Psaliodes annuligera Dognin, 1911
- Psaliodes antesignata L. B. Prout, 1934
- Psaliodes aparallela L. B. Prout, 1934
- Psaliodes apicenotata Dognin, 1910
- Psaliodes apostata Dognin, 1911
- Psaliodes aquila Dognin, 1911
- Psaliodes aurativena Warren, 1904
- Psaliodes bella Jones, 1921
- Psaliodes bicolor L. B. Prout, 1910
- Psaliodes biconalis Walker, 1859
- Psaliodes bifurcata Bastelberger, 1907
- Psaliodes bilineata Dognin, 1913
- Psaliodes bistrigata Dognin, 1906
- Psaliodes brachiata Warren, 1905
- Psaliodes castanea Warren, 1904
- Psaliodes catenifera Warren, 1907
- Psaliodes cedaza Dognin, 1899
- Psaliodes choma H. Druce, 1893
- Psaliodes cidariata Maassen, 1890
- Psaliodes citrinata Warren, 1904
- Psaliodes clathrata Warren, 1904
- Psaliodes claudiaria Schaus, 1912
- Psaliodes coacta Dognin, 1911
- Psaliodes completa Warren, 1904
- Psaliodes composita Dognin, 1911
- Psaliodes concinna Bastelberger, 1907
- Psaliodes confusa Warren, 1897
- Psaliodes conimaculata Dognin, 1910
- Psaliodes conspersata Warren, 1904
- Psaliodes crassinota Dognin, 1911
- Psaliodes crispata Schaus, 1912
- Psaliodes cronia H. Druce, 1893
- Psaliodes crotona H. Druce, 1893
- Psaliodes cupreipennis Dognin, 1914
- Psaliodes cydna H. Druce, 1893
- Psaliodes cynthia H. Druce, 1893
- Psaliodes daedala H. Druce, 1893
- Psaliodes damia H. Druce, 1893
- Psaliodes damophila H. Druce, 1893
- Psaliodes demasaria Schaus, 1912
- Psaliodes detractata Walker, 1862
- Psaliodes disrupta Dognin, 1913
- Psaliodes duplicilinea Warren, 1907
- Psaliodes electa Schaus, 1912
- Psaliodes endotrichiata Snellen, 1874
- Psaliodes euplaneta Dyar, 1916
- Psaliodes exilis Warren, 1907
- Psaliodes exuberans Dognin, 1911
- Psaliodes fervescens Dyar, 1920
- Psaliodes flavagata Guenée, [1858]
- Psaliodes flavivena Dognin, 1903
- Psaliodes fractifascia Dognin, 1903
- Psaliodes fractilinea Warren, 1904
- Psaliodes fulva Warren, 1905
- Psaliodes fuscata Warren, 1905
- Psaliodes geminisigna Dognin, 1918
- Psaliodes grandis Dognin, 1913
- Psaliodes hieroglyphica Schaus, 1901
- Psaliodes infantula Warren, 1900
- Psaliodes inferna Warren, 1904
- Psaliodes infulata Schaus, 1912
- Psaliodes infuscata Prout
- Psaliodes interrupta Dognin, 1913
- Psaliodes intersecta Dognin, 1911
- Psaliodes interstrata Schaus, 1912
- Psaliodes inundulata Guenée, [1858]
- Psaliodes jabata Dognin, 1899
- Psaliodes laticlara Dognin, 1904
- Psaliodes liebra Dognin, 1899
- Psaliodes lignosata Walker, 1862
- Psaliodes limbata Dognin, 1913
- Psaliodes lisera Dognin, 1899
- Psaliodes lucida Dognin, 1913
- Psaliodes magnipalpata Dognin, 1901
- Psaliodes marmorata Warren, 1905
- Psaliodes miniata Warren, 1904
- Psaliodes monapo Dyar, 1916
- Psaliodes multilinea Schaus, 1901
- Psaliodes myxa Druce, 1899
- Psaliodes nexilinea Warren, 1904
- Psaliodes nictitans Warren, 1904
- Psaliodes nigrifusa Bastelberger, 1907
- Psaliodes nivestrota Warren, 1907
- Psaliodes nodosa Warren, 1904
- Psaliodes nucleata Guenée, [1858]
- Psaliodes ocreata Snellen, 1874
- Psaliodes oleagina Dognin, 1911
- Psaliodes olivaria Warren, 1908
- Psaliodes olivescens Dognin, 1911
- Psaliodes onopria Dyar, 1927
- Psaliodes orozcoa Dyar, 1914
- Psaliodes ossicolor Warren, 1904
- Psaliodes paleata Guenée, [1858]
- Psaliodes pallida Schaus, 1901
- Psaliodes perfuscata Bastelberger, 1907
- Psaliodes pervasata Warren, 1904
- Psaliodes philetus Schaus, 1912
- Psaliodes picta Warren, 1904
- Psaliodes planiplaga Warren, 1904
- Psaliodes plumbescens Warren, 1904
- Psaliodes pomona H. Druce, 1893
- Psaliodes porcia H. Druce, 1893
- Psaliodes posides H. Druce, 1893
- Psaliodes potina H. Druce, 1893
- Psaliodes prionogramma L. B. Prout, 1910
- Psaliodes prunicolor Warren, 1904
- Psaliodes quinquelatera L. B. Prout, 1916
- Psaliodes repertita Dognin, 1913
- Psaliodes rica Dognin, 1899
- Psaliodes saja Dognin, 1893
- Psaliodes samaniegoi Dognin, 1891
- Psaliodes seitzi Bastelberger, 1907
- Psaliodes semirasa Warren, 1904
- Psaliodes semisecta L. B. Prout, 1916
- Psaliodes serratilinea Warren, 1904
- Psaliodes siennata Warren, 1904
- Psaliodes simplex Schaus, 1912
- Psaliodes sordida Warren, 1904
- Psaliodes stimulata Dognin, 1911
- Psaliodes strigosa Warren, 1904
- Psaliodes subfulvescens Warren, 1904
- Psaliodes subocellata Dognin, 1913
- Psaliodes subochreofusa Herbulot, 1988
- Psaliodes sutum Schaus, 1912
- Psaliodes tenuinota Dognin, 1911
- Psaliodes tolimata Dognin, 1913
- Psaliodes torsilinea Dognin, 1914
- Psaliodes trilunata Warren, 1904
- Psaliodes tripartita Warren, 1904
- Psaliodes tripita Dognin, 1895
- Psaliodes variegata Schaus, 1901
- Psaliodes vernifera L. B. Prout, 1929
- Psaliodes vinosata Warren, 1904
- Psaliodes vulpina Warren, 1904
