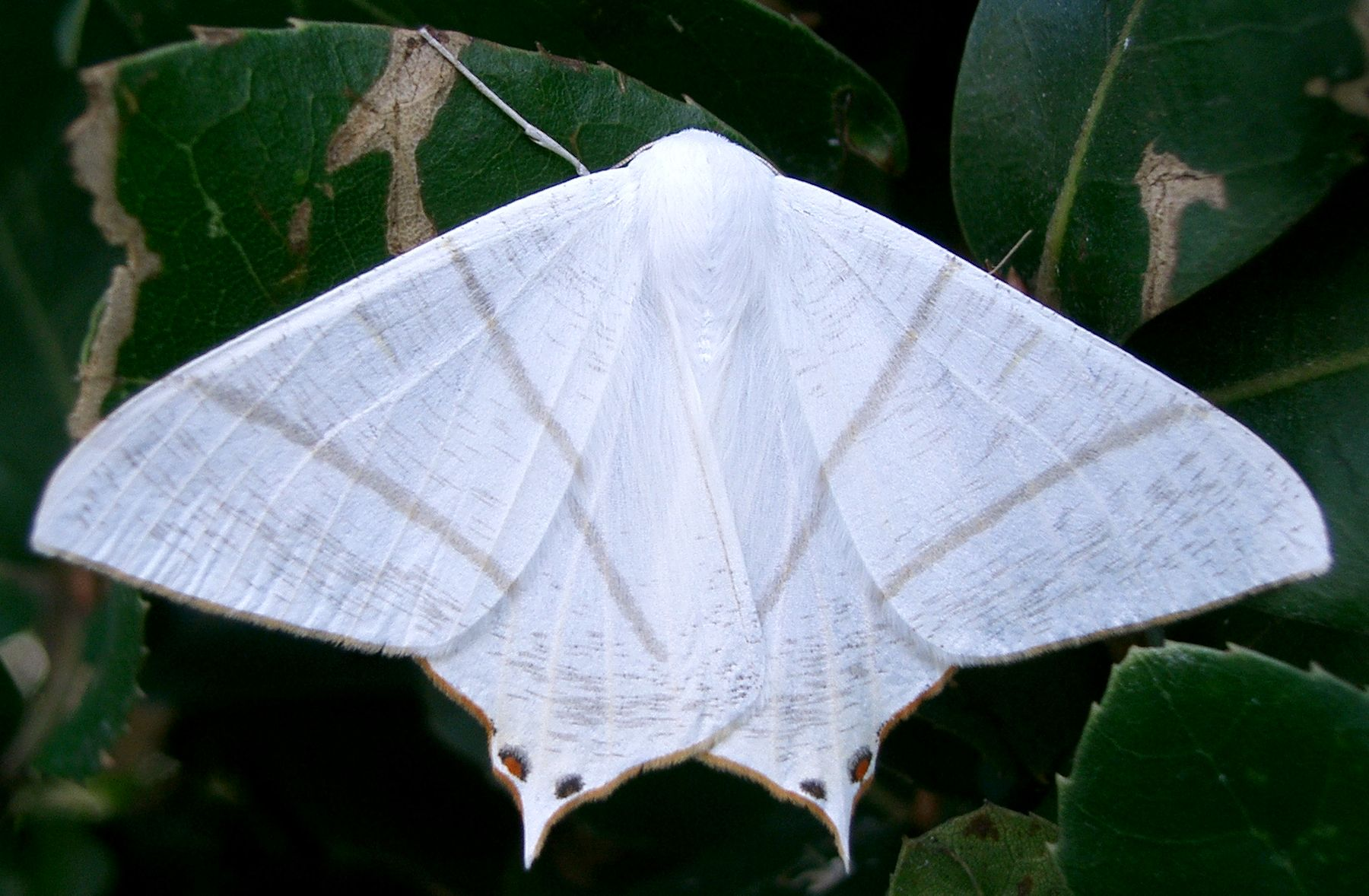
- Ourapteryx species

Scientific classification
- Kingdom: Animalia
- Phylum: Arthropoda
- Clade: Pancrustacea
- Class: Insecta
- Order: Lepidoptera
- Family: Geometridae
- Subfamily: Ennominae (Duponchel, 1845)

Tribes
- Abraxini; Angeronini; Apeirini; Apochimini; Azelinini; Baptini; Bistonini (disputed); Boarmiini; Bupalini (disputed); Caberini; Campaeini (disputed); Cheimopteini; Colotoini; Cystidiini; Desertobiini; †Eogeometer (Fischer, Michalski & Hausmann, 2019); Ennomini; Erannini (disputed); Gnophini (Duponchel, 1845) (disputed); Gonodontini (including Odontoperini); Lithinini (disputed); Macariini; Melanolophiini (disputed); Nacophorini (disputed); Ourapterygini; Phaseliini (disputed); Sphacelodini; Theriini (disputed); Wilemanini; and see text

= Ennominae =

Subfamily of the geometer moths

Ennominae is the largest subfamily of the geometer moth family (Geometridae), with some 9,700 described species in 1,100 genera. Most species are fairly small, though some (such as the peppered moth) grow to be considerably large. This subfamily has a global distribution. It includes some species that are notorious defoliating pests. The subfamily was first described by Philogène Auguste Joseph Duponchel in 1845.

The status of several tribes is debated. For example, the Boarmiini are sometimes massively expanded to include the Bistonini, Bupalini, Erannini, Gnophini, Melanolophini, Phaseliini and Theriini. The Nacophorini and perhaps the Campaeini might need to be merged with the Lithinini, and all three might warrant merging into the Ennomini. The group sometimes separated as Cassymini is tentatively included in the Abraxini here. The Alsophilinae, usually treated as a small subfamily in their own right, might simply be a specialized lineage of Boarmiini.

== Physiology and life cycle ==
Individuals of the species are typically fairly small, being composed of slender bodies and broader wings, with adults' wingspans ranging from 15 to 50mm. When at rest, many species hold their wings away from their bodies, often in characteristic positions for their species. Most larvae have two pairs of hind legs, which differ from many other families. However, their lifecycle is similar to other families, going from egg to larva to pupae to adults.

== Selected genera ==
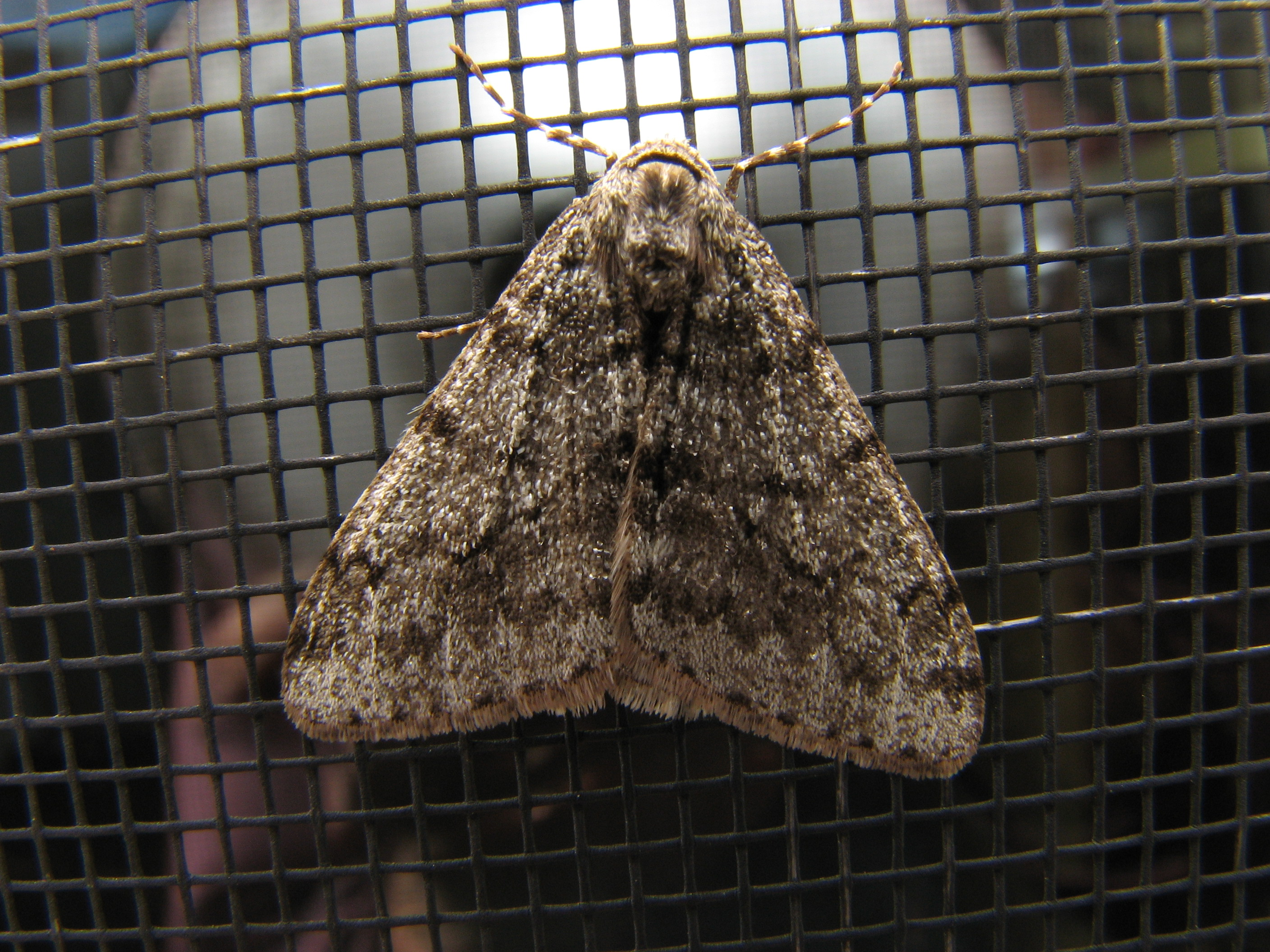
Male Phigalia strigataria

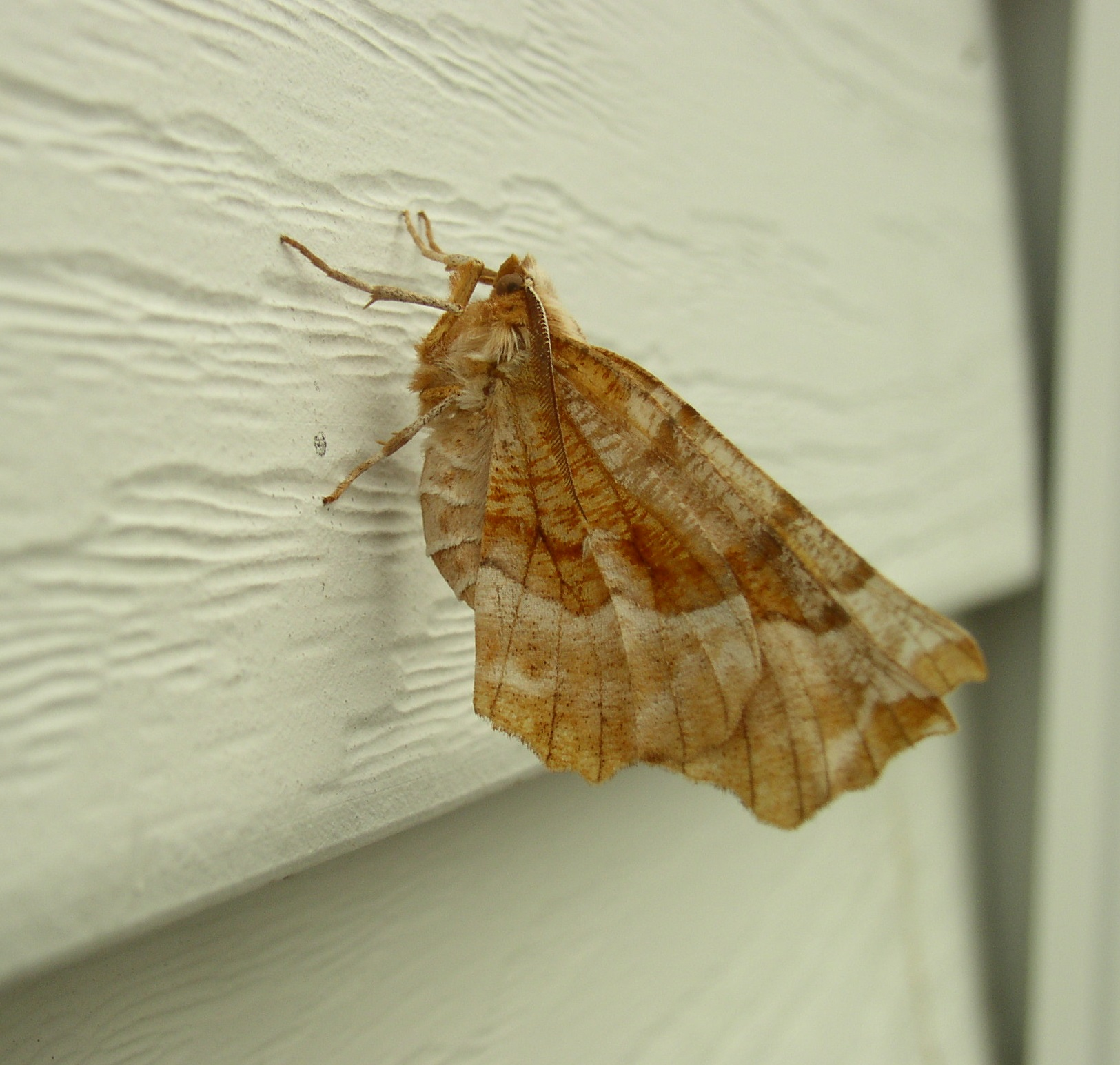
Male Selenia kentaria

Tribe Baptini

- Lomographa

Tribe Boarmiini

- †Eogeometer (Fischer, Michalski & Hausmann, 2019)

Tribe Bupalini

- Bupalus

Tribe Caberini

- Cabera

Tribe Campaeini

- Campaea

Tribe Colotoini

- Colotois

Tribe Erannini

- Erannis

Tribe Gnophini

- Charissa
- Gnophos
- Hirasa

Tribe Gonodontini

- Aethiopodes (sometimes in Odontopera)
- Odontopera

== Genera incertae sedis ==
Numerous genera have hitherto not been definitely assigned to a tribe. These include:

- Adalbertia
- Anectropis
- Anavitrinelia
- Bichroma
- Chelotephrina
- Chemerina
- Chesiadodes
- Ciropteryx
- Cratoptera
- Compsoptera
- Cyclomia
- Declana - Nacophorini?
- Enconista
- Entomopteryx
- Eubarnesia
- Geolyces
- Guara
- Hispophora
- Hoplosauris - Ennomini?
- Hulstina
- Hyalinetta
- Hyalostenele
- Hylemeridia
- Hypochrosis
- Leptepistomion
- Lhommeia
- Liodesina
- Lobocraspeda
- Melanochroia
- Mericisca
- Metanema
- Metarranthis
- Miantochora
- Nepterotaea
- Neritodes - Macariini?
- Onychora
- Ortaliella
- Orthocabera - Abraxini (Cassymini if distinct)?
- Orthofidonia - Boarmiini?
- Paraglaucina
- Parapheromia
- Petelia
- Prionomelia
- Probole
- Pseudocoremia - Boarmiini?
- Pterotaea
- Pyrinia
- Rhoptria
- Ruttellerona
- Slossonia
- Sperrya
- Syncirsodes
- Synglochis
- Toulgoetia
- Tracheops
- Tritocleis (extinct)
- Xenoecista
- Xylopteryx
- Zamarada - Abraxini (Cassymini if distinct)?

== Habitat ==
A study published in 2022 examined the habitat and seasonal preferences of Ennominae moths. Through their studies they found that this species of moth preferred to live in elevations of 2000-2300m above sea level, areas with temperatures around 10-15 degrees celsius and high average precipitation. These finding led the researchers to conclude that the species is most abundant during the months of October and November.

== Habitat relocation ==
In 2021, a study found that 11 species of ennominae moths had been reported in new areas for the first time. These areas at the northwestern ends of mixed broadleaf-Korean pine forests were a considerable distance from some of their previously recorded habitats in the far east. The experiment was conducted throughout 2019-2021, and was done by surveying the moths collected from those attracted to the lamp set out for the experiment. The following species: Eilicrinia nuptaria, Eudjakonovia emundata, Menophra senilis, Ectropis excellens, Ectropis aigneri, Mesastrape fulguraria, Arichanna tetrica, Agriopis dira, Larerannis orthogrammaria, Phigalia verecundaria, and Phanerothyris sinearia were collected. These findings provided insight that Ennominae moths may be capable of further relocation than previously believed, but more data would be needed to know for sure.

== Fossils ==
In 2019, the first geometrid caterpillar in Baltic amber was discovered by German scientists. Described under Eogeometer vadens, it measured about 5 mm (0.20 in), and was estimated to be 44 million years old, dating back to Eocene epoch. It was described as the earliest evidence for the subfamily of Ennominae, particularly the tribe of Boarmiini.
