= Metanema determinata =

Scientific classification
- Kingdom: Animalia
- Phylum: Arthropoda
- Class: Insecta
- Order: Lepidoptera
- Family: Geometridae
- Genus: Metanema
- Species: M. determinata

Binomial name
- Metanema determinata Walker, 1866

Species of moth

Metanema determinata, known generally as the dark metanema or dark-banded thorn, is a species of geometrid moth in the family Geometridae. It is found in North America.

The MONA or Hodges number for Metanema determinata is 6820.
