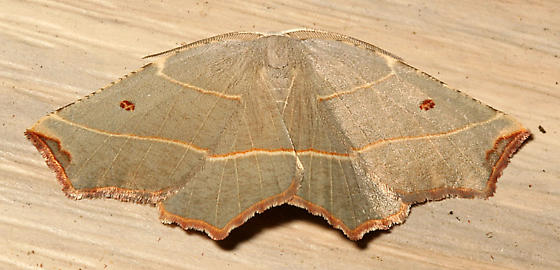
- Metanema inatomaria

Scientific classification
- Kingdom: Animalia
- Phylum: Arthropoda
- Class: Insecta
- Order: Lepidoptera
- Family: Geometridae
- Subfamily: Ennominae
- Genus: Metanema; Guenée in Boisduval & Guenée, 1857

= Metanema =

Genus of moths

Metanema is a genus of moths in the family Geometridae erected by Achille Guenée in 1857. It contains the following species:

- Metanema bonadea Druce 1892
- Metanema carnaria Packard 1873
- Metanema determinata Walker 1866
- Metanema excavaria Schaus 1901
- Metanema flavida Dognin 1913
- Metanema guatama Schaus 1901
- Metanema inatomaria Guenée 1858
- Metanema lurida Druce 1898
- Metanema margica Schaus 1901
- Metanema santella Schaus 1901
- Metanema simplex Dyar 1938
- Metanema striolata Schaus 1912
- Metanema ugallia Dyar 1912
- Metanema ustinota Prout 1925
