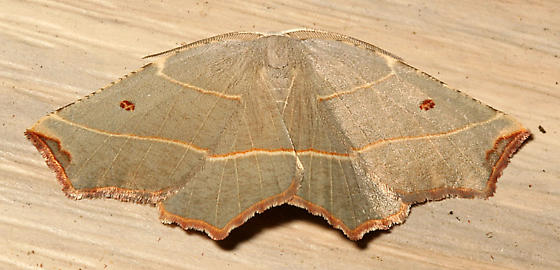

Scientific classification
- Kingdom: Animalia
- Phylum: Arthropoda
- Class: Insecta
- Order: Lepidoptera
- Family: Geometridae
- Genus: Metanema
- Species: M. inatomaria

Binomial name
- Metanema inatomaria Guenée, 1857

= Metanema inatomaria =

Species of moth

Metanema inatomaria, the pale metanema or yellow-lined thorn, is a moth of the family Geometridae. The species was first described by Achille Guenée in 1857. It is found from east-central British Columbia and southern Northwest Territories and Yukon, east to Nova Scotia, south to Mississippi, Texas and Arizona.

The wingspan is 25–36 mm. Adults are on wing from late May to mid July.

The larvae mainly feed on Populus and occasionally Salix species.
