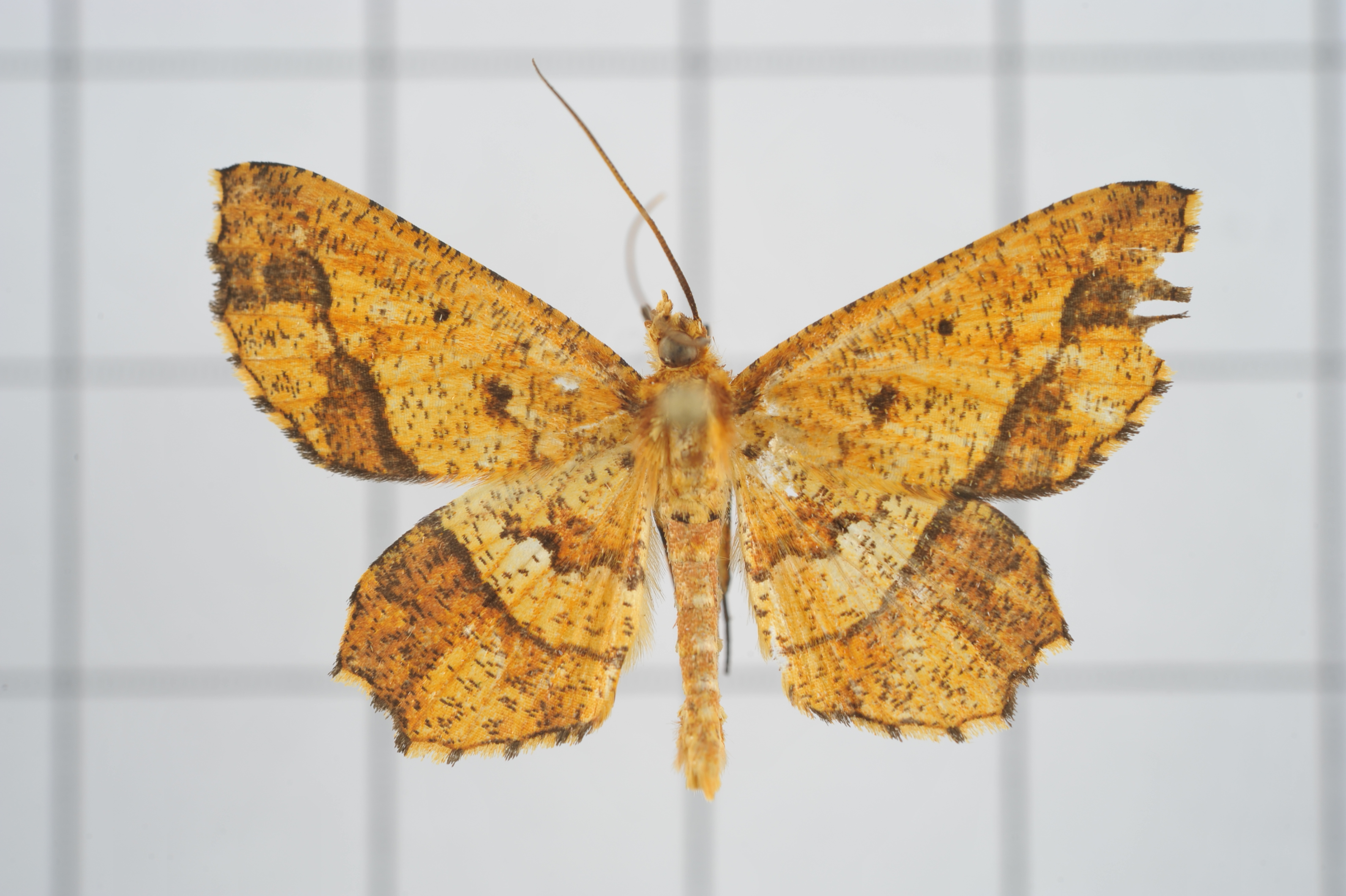

Scientific classification
- Kingdom: Animalia
- Phylum: Arthropoda
- Clade: Pancrustacea
- Class: Insecta
- Order: Lepidoptera
- Family: Geometridae
- Genus: Entomopteryx
- Species: E. combusta

Binomial name
- Entomopteryx combusta (Warren, 1893)

Synonyms
- Callerinnys combusta Warren, 1893; Erinnys combusta Warren, 1893

= Entomopteryx combusta =

Species of moth

Entomopteryx combusta is a moth of the family Geometridae first described by Warren in 1893. It is found in Sikkim in India, Sri Lanka, Java, Taiwan, and Japan.

The male's antennae is prismatic. Facies dull yellow, speckled and marked with reddish brown. A strong medial fascia runs through the discal dot in hindwings. Male has narrow forewings. Female has extensively reddish brown forewings.
