= Pyrinia incensata =

Scientific classification
- Kingdom: Animalia
- Phylum: Arthropoda
- Class: Insecta
- Order: Lepidoptera
- Family: Geometridae
- Genus: Pyrinia
- Species: P. incensata

Binomial name
- Pyrinia incensata Walker, 1863

Species of moth

Pyrinia incensata is a species of moth of the family Geometridae. It was described by Francis Walker in 1863. It is found in Pará, Brazil.

Adults are bright ochraceous, the wings minutely red speckled. The exterior line is red, straight, oblique and well defined and the submarginal line is red, indistinct and nearly obsolete in the forewings. The forewings are slightly acute, with a hyaline (glass-like) basal dot. The interior line is red, slight and bent and the exterior line is forked near the costa, where it includes a purplish mark.
