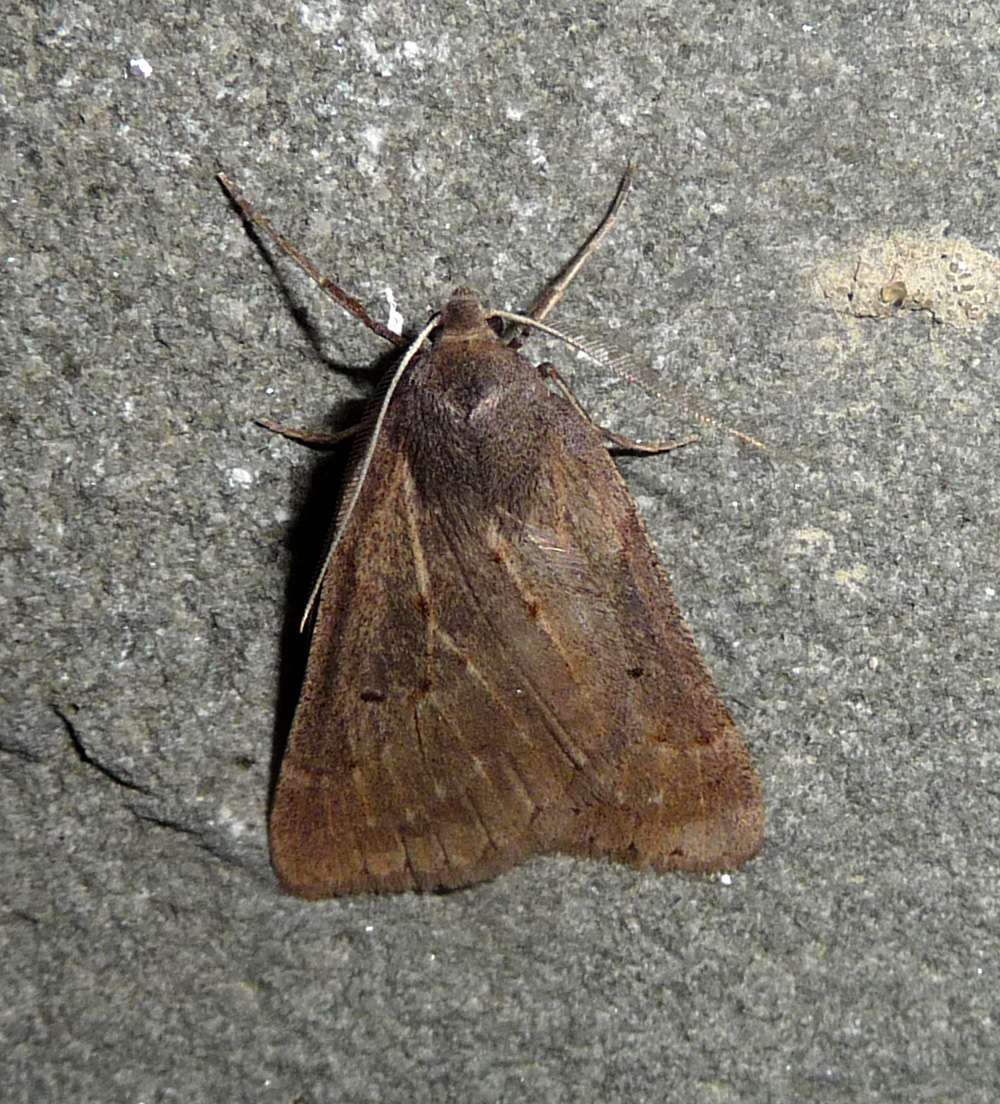

Scientific classification
- Kingdom: Animalia
- Phylum: Arthropoda
- Class: Insecta
- Order: Lepidoptera
- Family: Geometridae
- Subfamily: Ennominae
- Genus: Chemerina; Boisduval, 1840

= Chemerina =

Genus of moths

Chemerina is a monotypic genus of moths in the family Geometridae.

== Species ==
- Chemerina caliginearia (Rambur, 1833)
