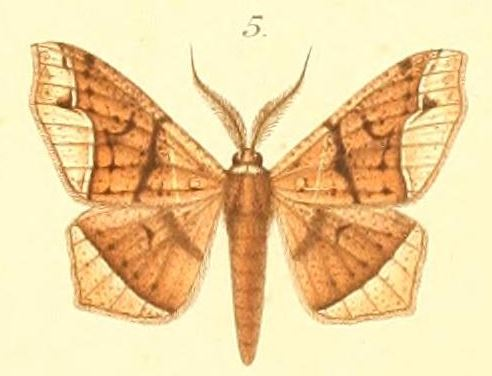
- Miantochora gumppenbergi

Scientific classification
- Kingdom: Animalia
- Phylum: Arthropoda
- Class: Insecta
- Order: Lepidoptera
- Family: Geometridae
- Subfamily: Ennominae
- Genus: Miantochora; Warren, 1895

= Miantochora =

Genus of moths

Miantochora is a genus of moths in the family Geometridae first described by Warren in 1895.

== Species ==
- Miantochora inaequilinea Warren, 1895
- Miantochora siniaevi Herbulot, 2002
- Miantochora rufaria (Swinhoe, 1904)
