= Pyrinia =

- Pyrinia mephasaria

Scientific classification
- Kingdom: Animalia
- Phylum: Arthropoda
- Clade: Pancrustacea
- Class: Insecta
- Order: Lepidoptera
- Family: Geometridae
- Subfamily: Ennominae
- Genus: Pyrinia; Hübner, 1818

Genus of moths

Pyrinia is a genus of moths in the family Geometridae erected by Jacob Hübner in 1818.

== Selected species ==
- Pyrinia elfina (Warren, 1894) Brazil
- Pyrinia fulvata Warren, 1894
- Pyrinia gallaria (Walker, 1860) Rio de Janeiro, Brazil
- Pyrinia icosiata Walker, 1860 Tefé & Amazonas, Brazil
- Pyrinia incensata Walker, 1863 Pará, Brazil
- Pyrinia mimicaria (Walker, [1863]) Pará, Brazil
- Pyrinia resignata (Guenée, 1857) Brazil
- Pyrinia rutilaria Hübner, 1818 Suriname
- Pyrinia sabasia Schaus, 1927 São Paulo, Brazil
- Pyrinia signifera Warren, 1894 Rio de Janeiro, Brazil
