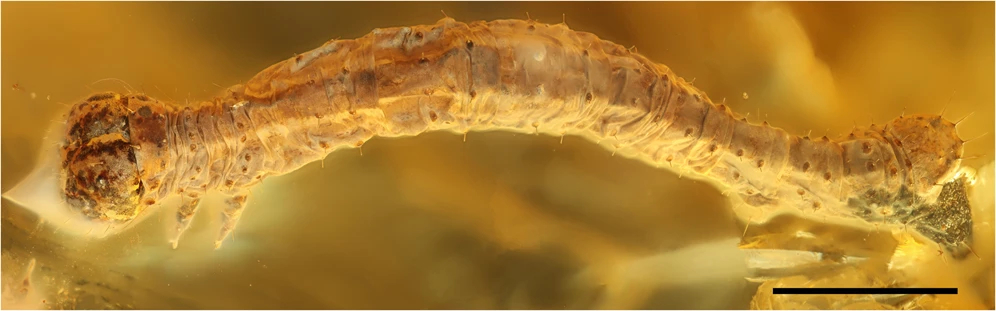
- Holotype in amber

Scientific classification
- Kingdom: Animalia
- Phylum: Arthropoda
- Clade: Pancrustacea
- Class: Insecta
- Order: Lepidoptera
- Family: Geometridae
- Genus: †Eogeometer; Fischer, Michalski, & Hausmann, 2019
- Species: †E. vadens

Binomial name
- †Eogeometer vadens Fischer, Michalski, & Hausmann, 2019

= Eogeometer =

Eogeometer Temporal range: Lutetian 44–44 Ma

Extinct genus of moths

Eogeometer is an extinct genus of Ennomine geometer moths in the tribe Boarmiini. The type and only species is Eogeometer vadens, the specimen of which measured about 5 mm (0.20 in), and was estimated to be 44 million years old, dating back to Eocene epoch. Both the genus and species were described by Thilo C. Fischer, Artur Michalski and Axel Hausmann in 2019 as the first geometrid caterpillar in Baltic amber.
