= Leptepistomion =

Scientific classification
- Kingdom: Animalia
- Phylum: Arthropoda
- Clade: Pancrustacea
- Class: Insecta
- Order: Lepidoptera
- Family: Geometridae
- Subfamily: Ennominae
- Genus: Leptepistomion; Wehrli, 1936
- Species: L. concinna

Binomial name
- Leptepistomion concinna (Warren, 1894)

Genus of moths

Leptepistomion is a monotypic moth genus in the family Geometridae described by Wehrli in 1936. Its only species, Leptepistomion concinna, was first described by Warren in 1894. It is found in Tibet.
