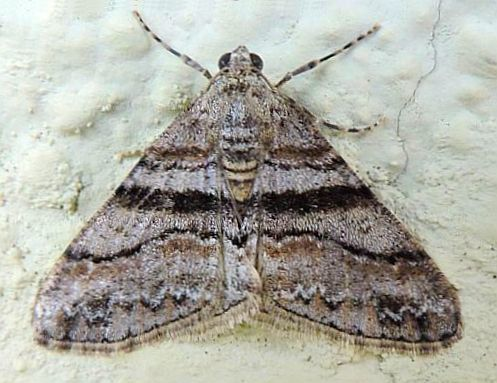

Scientific classification
- Kingdom: Animalia
- Phylum: Arthropoda
- Clade: Pancrustacea
- Class: Insecta
- Order: Lepidoptera
- Family: Geometridae
- Genus: Prionomelia
- Species: P. spododea

Binomial name
- Prionomelia spododea (Hulst, 1896)

= Prionomelia spododea =

Species of moth

Prionomelia spododea is a species of geometrid moth in the family Geometridae. It is found in North America.
