= Bichroma =

Scientific classification
- Kingdom: Animalia
- Phylum: Arthropoda
- Class: Insecta
- Order: Lepidoptera
- Family: Geometridae
- Subfamily: Ennominae
- Genus: Bichroma

Species
- Bichroma brunnea; Bichroma concordaria; Bichroma famula; Bichroma tenebrosa

Genus of moths

Bichroma is a genus of moths in the family Geometridae.
