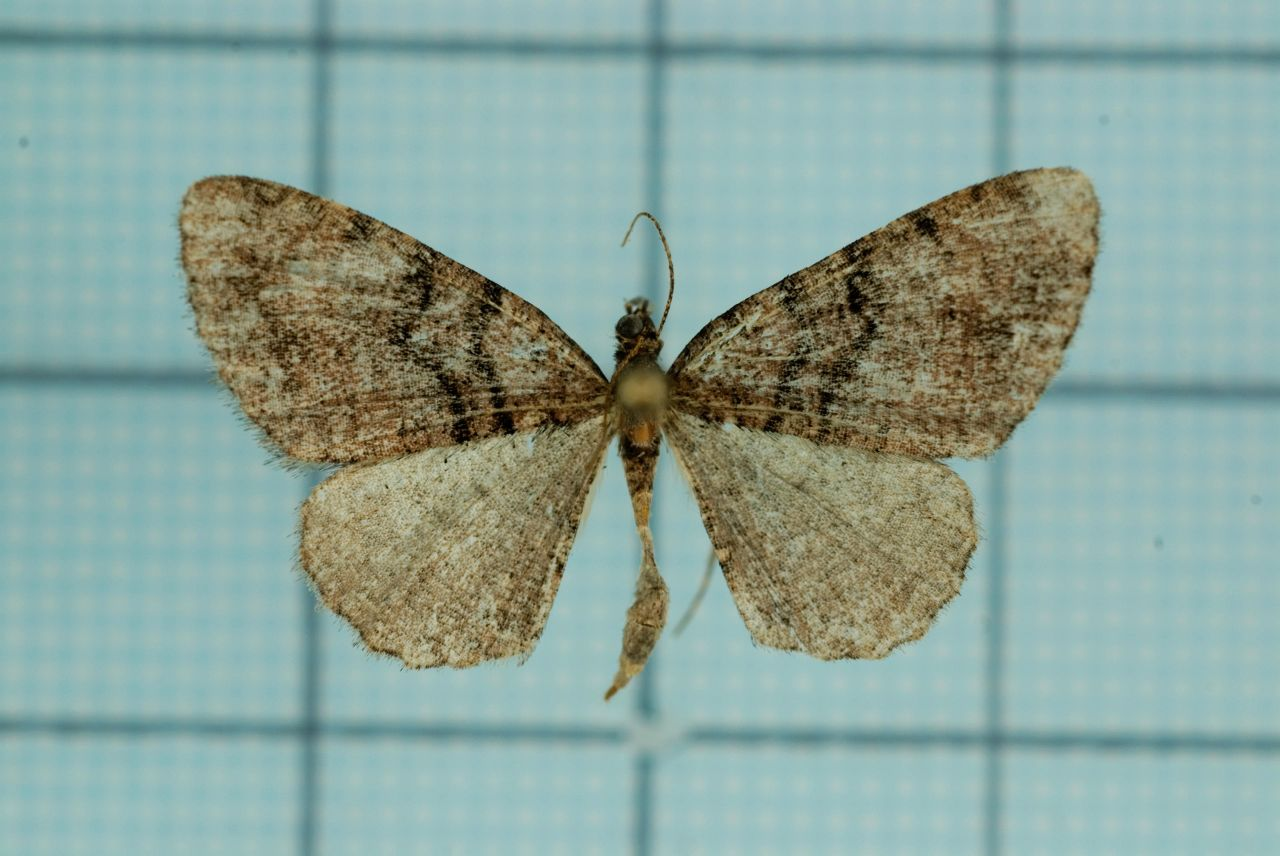
- Size: 26.2 mm

Scientific classification
- Kingdom: Animalia
- Phylum: Arthropoda
- Class: Insecta
- Order: Lepidoptera
- Family: Geometridae
- Subfamily: Ennominae
- Genus: Anectropis; Sato, 1991

= Anectropis =

Genus of geometer moths

Anectropis is a genus of moths in the family Geometridae described by Sato in 1991.

== Selected species ==
- Anectropis fumigata Sato, 1991
- Anectropis semifascia (Bastelberger, 1909)
