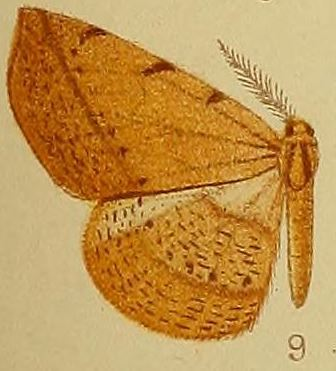
- Geolyces rufescens

Scientific classification
- Kingdom: Animalia
- Phylum: Arthropoda
- Class: Insecta
- Order: Lepidoptera
- Family: Geometridae
- Subfamily: Ennominae
- Genus: Geolyces; Warren, 1894

= Geolyces =

Genus of moths

Geolyces is a genus of moths in the family Geometridae described by Warren in 1894. This name is a replacement name for Lyces Walker, 1860.
