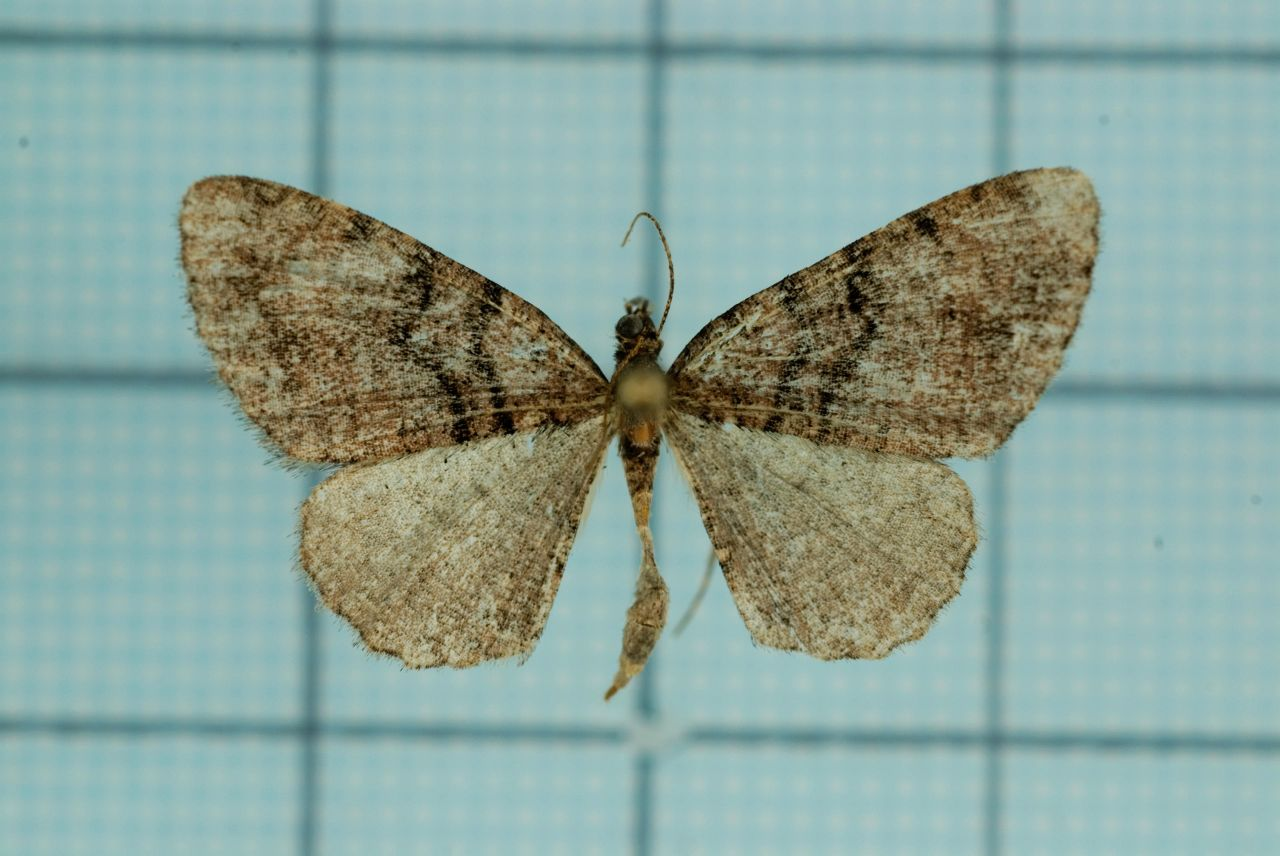

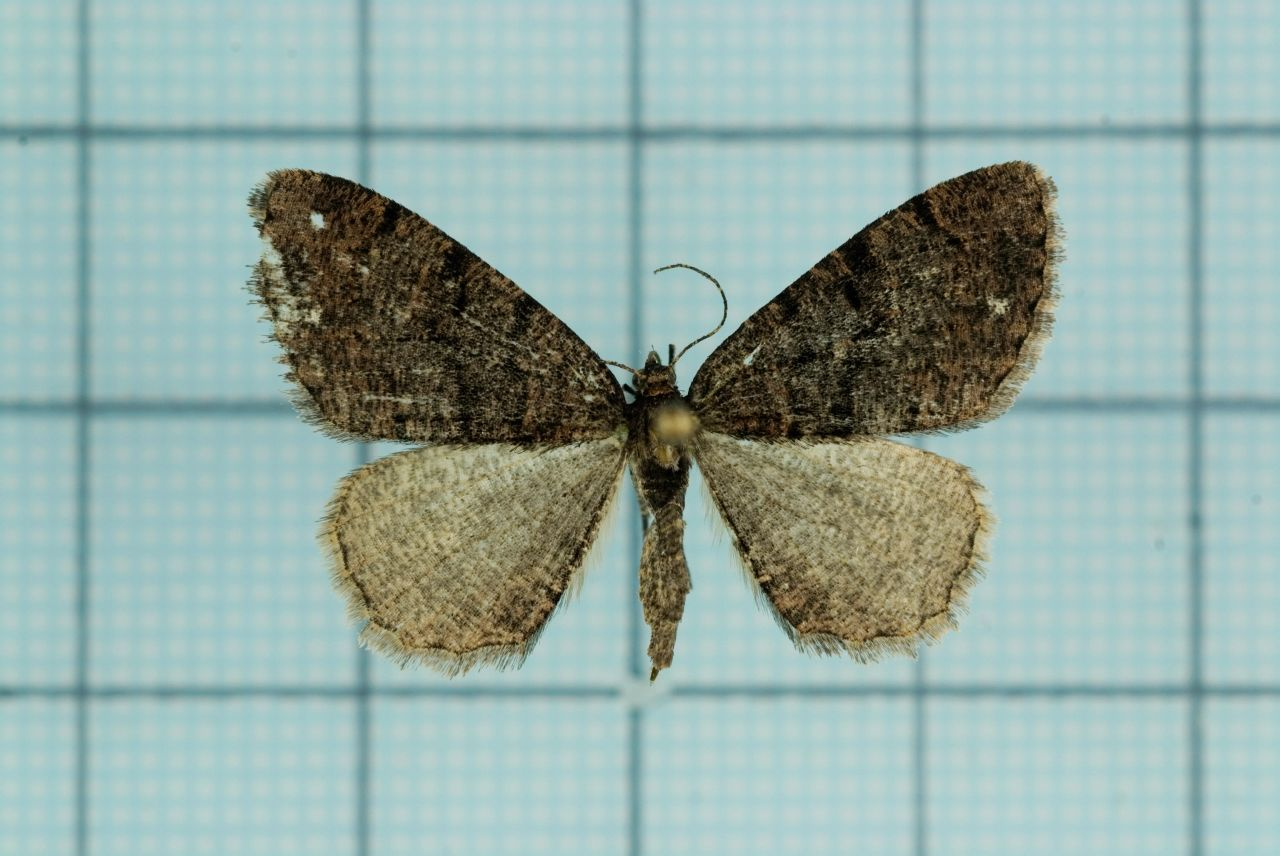

Scientific classification
- Kingdom: Animalia
- Phylum: Arthropoda
- Class: Insecta
- Order: Lepidoptera
- Family: Geometridae
- Genus: Anectropis
- Species: A. fumigata

Binomial name
- Anectropis fumigata Sato, 1991

= Anectropis fumigata =

Species of moth

Anectropis fumigata is a moth of the family Geometridae first described by Sato in 1991. It is found in Taiwan.
