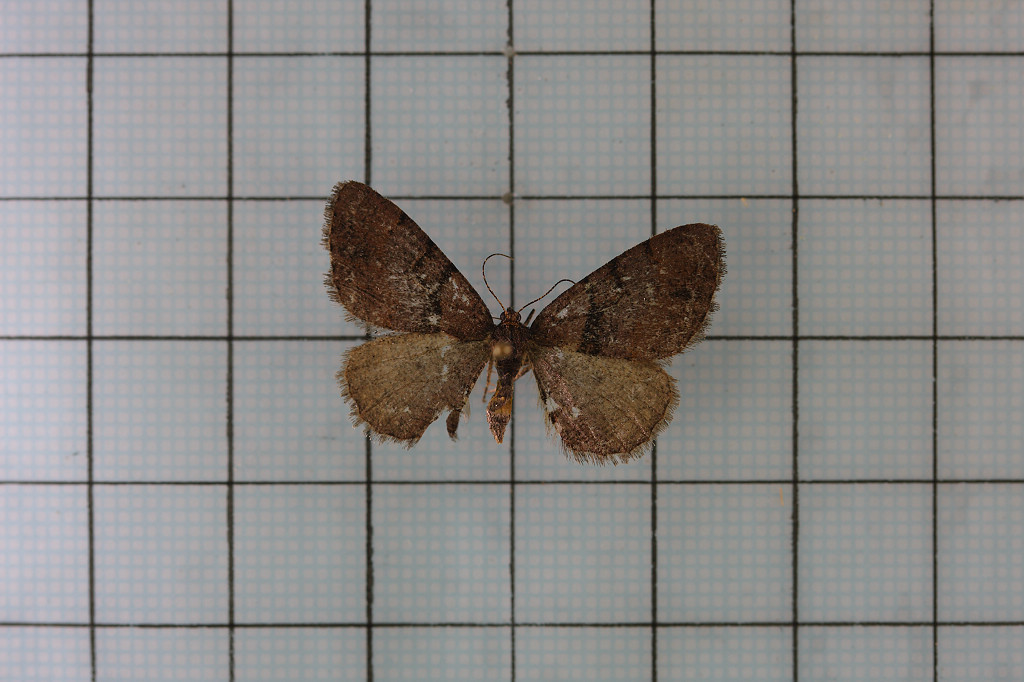

Scientific classification
- Kingdom: Animalia
- Phylum: Arthropoda
- Class: Insecta
- Order: Lepidoptera
- Family: Geometridae
- Genus: Anectropis
- Species: A. semifascia

Binomial name
- Anectropis semifascia (Bastelberger, 1909)

Synonyms
- Myrioblephara semifascia Bastelberger, 1909

= Anectropis semifascia =

Species of moth

Anectropis semifascia is a moth of the family Geometridae. It is found in Taiwan.
