= Guara rhaphis =

Scientific classification
- Kingdom: Animalia
- Phylum: Arthropoda
- Clade: Pancrustacea
- Class: Insecta
- Order: Lepidoptera
- Family: Geometridae
- Subfamily: Ennominae
- Genus: Guara; Rindge, 1986
- Species: G. rhaphis

Binomial name
- Guara rhaphis Rindge, 1986

Species of moth

Guara rhaphis is the only species in the monotypic moth genus Guara of the family Geometridae. It is found in Chile. Both the genus and species were first described by Rindge in 1986.
