= Nepterotaea furva =

Scientific classification
- Domain: Eukaryota
- Kingdom: Animalia
- Phylum: Arthropoda
- Class: Insecta
- Order: Lepidoptera
- Family: Geometridae
- Tribe: Boarmiini
- Genus: Nepterotaea
- Species: N. furva

Binomial name
- Nepterotaea furva Rindge, 1973

Species of moth

Nepterotaea furva is a species of geometrid moth in the family Geometridae. It is found in North America.

The MONA or Hodges number for Nepterotaea furva is 6526.
