= Cratoptera =

Scientific classification
- Kingdom: Animalia
- Phylum: Arthropoda
- Class: Insecta
- Order: Lepidoptera
- Family: Geometridae
- Subfamily: Ennominae
- Genus: Cratoptera; Herrich-Schäffer, [1855]

Genus of moths

Cratoptera is a genus of moths in the family Geometridae. Their faunal composition can proportionally increase in change with geographical altitude.

== Species ==
- Cratoptera apicata Warren, 1894
- Cratoptera vestianaria Herrich-Schäffer, [1855]
