= Prionomelia =

Scientific classification
- Kingdom: Animalia
- Phylum: Arthropoda
- Class: Insecta
- Order: Lepidoptera
- Family: Geometridae
- Tribe: Boarmiini
- Genus: Prionomelia

Genus of moths

Prionomelia is a genus of moths in the family Geometridae. It lives mostly in the southwestern United States, specifically Arizona, New Mexico, and Texas.

== Species ==
- Prionomelia spododea (Hulst, 1896)
