= Liodesina =

Scientific classification
- Kingdom: Animalia
- Phylum: Arthropoda
- Class: Insecta
- Order: Lepidoptera
- Family: Geometridae
- Genus: Liodesina; Wehrli, 1938

Genus of moths

Liodesina is a genus of moths in the family Geometridae first described by Wehrli in 1938.

== Species ==
- Liodesina homochromata (Mabille, 1869)
