= Entomopteryx =

Scientific classification
- Kingdom: Animalia
- Phylum: Arthropoda
- Clade: Pancrustacea
- Class: Insecta
- Order: Lepidoptera
- Family: Geometridae
- Genus: Entomopteryx; Guenée in Boisduval & Guenée, 1857

Genus of moths

Entomopteryx rubridisca

Entomopteryx is a genus of moths in the family Geometridae erected by Achille Guenée in 1857.

== Species ==
- Entomopteryx amputata Guenée, 1857
- Entomopteryx combusta (Warren, 1893)
- Entomopteryx deminuta (Warren, 1894)
- Entomopteryx statheuta (Prout, 1932)
