= Hyalinetta =

Scientific classification
- Kingdom: Animalia
- Phylum: Arthropoda
- Clade: Pancrustacea
- Class: Insecta
- Order: Lepidoptera
- Family: Geometridae
- Genus: Hyalinetta; C. Swinhoe, 1894
- Species: H. megaspila

Binomial name
- Hyalinetta megaspila (Moore, [1868])

Synonyms
- Leptesthes Warren, 1894

Monotypic genus of moths

Hyalinetta is a monotypic moth genus in the family Geometridae described by Charles Swinhoe in 1894. Its only species, Hyalinetta megaspila, was first described by Frederic Moore in 1868. It is found in the Bengal region of what was then British India.
