= Nepterotaea =

Scientific classification
- Kingdom: Animalia
- Phylum: Arthropoda
- Class: Insecta
- Order: Lepidoptera
- Family: Geometridae
- Tribe: Boarmiini
- Genus: Nepterotaea

Genus of moths

Nepterotaea is a genus of moths in the family Geometridae.

== Species ==
- Nepterotaea diagonalis
- Nepterotaea furva
