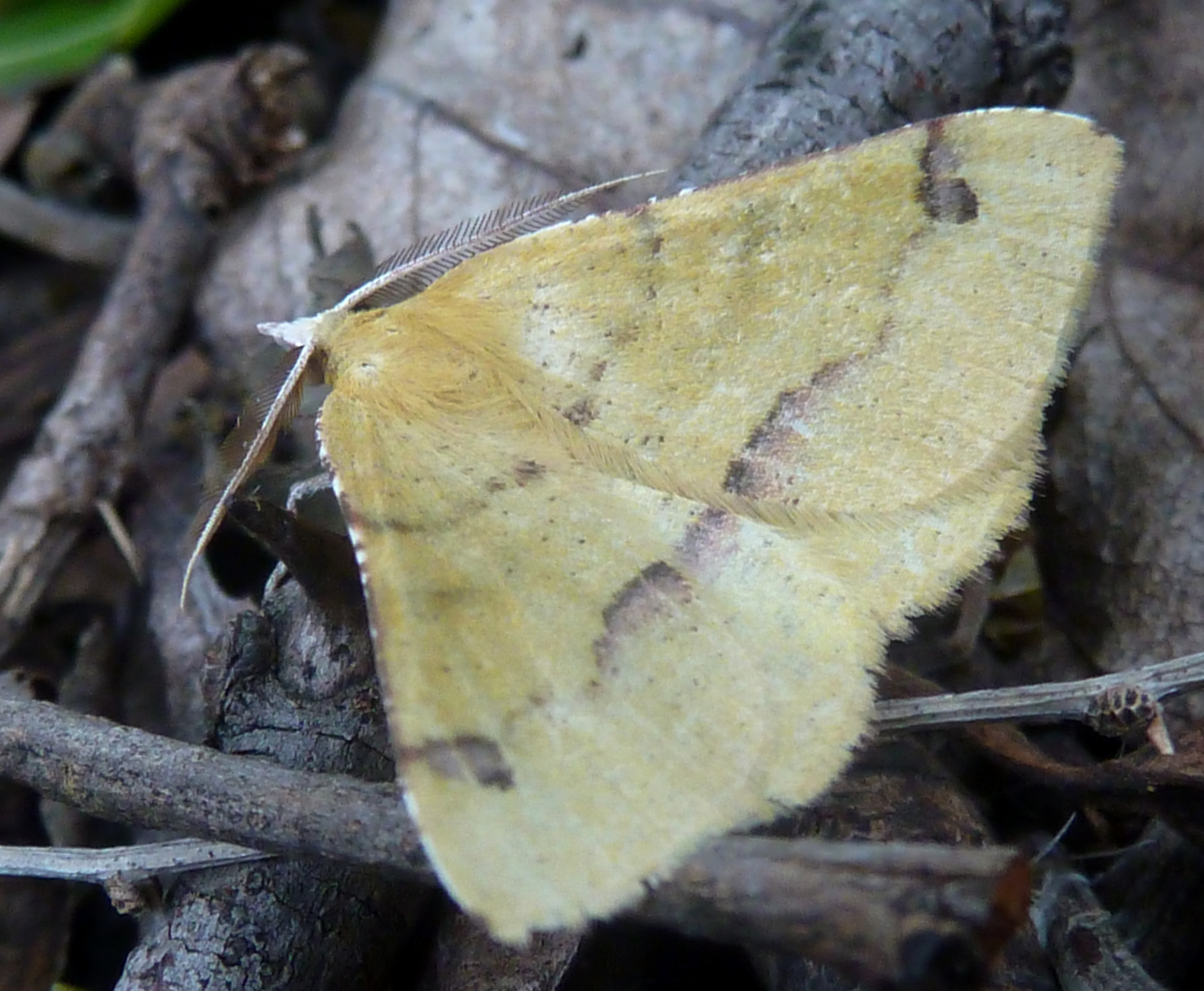
- Banded thorn (Lhommeia subapicata) in South Africa

Scientific classification
- Kingdom: Animalia
- Phylum: Arthropoda
- Clade: Pancrustacea
- Class: Insecta
- Order: Lepidoptera
- Family: Geometridae
- Genus: Lhommeia; Wehrli, 1939

= Lhommeia =

Genus of moths

Lhommeia is a genus of moths in the family Geometridae described by Wehrli in 1939.

== Species ==
- Lhommeia aediphlebia Hampson, 1899
- Lhommeia biskrara Oberthür, 1885
  - Lhommeia biskrara bleusei Thierry-Mieg, 1905
  - Lhommeia biskrara cinnamomaria Rothschild, 1914
  - Lhommeia biskrara illiturata Warren, 1897
  - Lhommeia biskrara viridaria Rothschild, 1914
- Lhommeia subapicata Warren, 1899
