= Adalbertia =

Scientific classification
- Kingdom: Animalia
- Phylum: Arthropoda
- Class: Insecta
- Order: Lepidoptera
- Family: Geometridae
- Tribe: Campaeini
- Genus: Adalbertia; Wehrli, 1931

Genus of geometer moths

Adalbertia is a genus of moths in the family Geometridae.

== Species ==
- Adalbertia castiliaria (Staudinger, 1900)
- Adalbertia cortes
- Adalbertia dumonti
- Adalbertia duponti
