= Syncirsodes =

Scientific classification
- Kingdom: Animalia
- Phylum: Arthropoda
- Clade: Pancrustacea
- Class: Insecta
- Order: Lepidoptera
- Family: Geometridae
- Genus: Syncirsodes; Butler, 1882

Genus of moths

Syncirsodes is a genus of moths in the family Geometridae erected by Arthur Gardiner Butler in 1882. Both species are found in Chile.

== Species ==
- Syncirsodes deustata (Felder & Rogenhofer, 1875)
- Syncirsodes straminea Butler, 1882
