= Lobocraspeda =

Scientific classification
- Kingdom: Animalia
- Phylum: Arthropoda
- Clade: Pancrustacea
- Class: Insecta
- Order: Lepidoptera
- Family: Geometridae
- Genus: Lobocraspeda; Warren, 1897

Genus of insects

Lobocraspeda is a genus of moths in the family Geometridae first described by Warren in 1897.

Cladogram according to the Catalogue of Life:

- Lobocraspeda
  - Lobocraspeda coeruleostriga
  - Lobocraspeda latefascia
  - Lobocraspeda stygnota
