= Hispophora =

Scientific classification
- Kingdom: Animalia
- Phylum: Arthropoda
- Clade: Pancrustacea
- Class: Insecta
- Order: Lepidoptera
- Family: Geometridae
- Genus: Hispophora; Janse, 1932

Genus of moths

Hispophora is a genus of moths in the family Geometridae described by Anthonie Johannes Theodorus Janse in 1932.

== Species ==
- Hispophora amica (Prout, 1915)
- Hispophora lechriospilota (Prout, 1922)
