= Hylemeridia =

Scientific classification
- Kingdom: Animalia
- Phylum: Arthropoda
- Clade: Pancrustacea
- Class: Insecta
- Order: Lepidoptera
- Family: Geometridae
- Genus: Hylemeridia; L. B. Prout, 1915

Genus of moths

Hylemeridia is a genus of moths in the family Geometridae erected by Louis Beethoven Prout in 1915.

== Species ==
- Hylemeridia eurymelanotes Prout, 1915
- Hylemeridia majuscula Prout, 1915
- Hylemeridia nigricosta Prout, 1915
