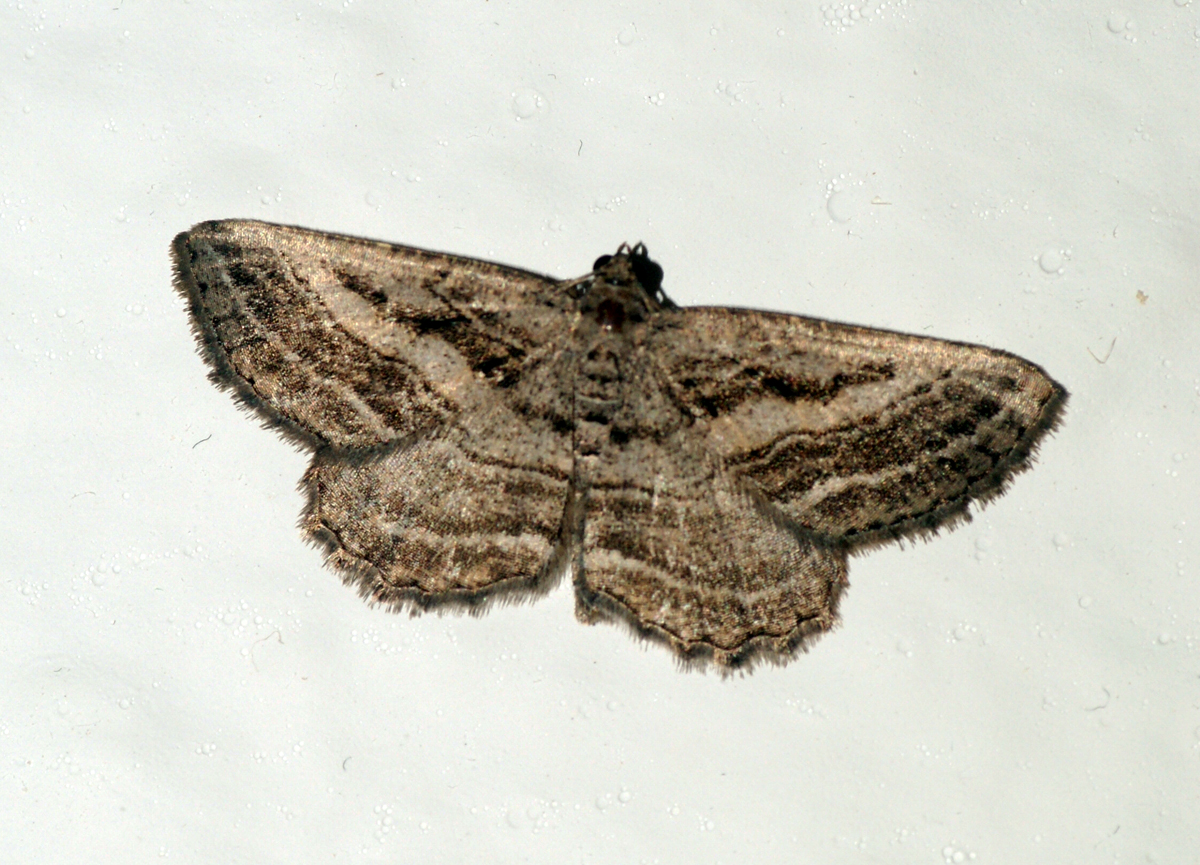

Scientific classification
- Kingdom: Animalia
- Phylum: Arthropoda
- Clade: Pancrustacea
- Class: Insecta
- Order: Lepidoptera
- Family: Geometridae
- Genus: Rhoptria; Guenée, 1857

= Rhoptria =

Genus of moths

Rhoptria is a genus of moths in the family Geometridae first described by Achille Guenée in 1857.

== Species ==
- Roptria asperaria (Hübner, 1817)
- Roptria dolosaria (Herrich-Schäffer, 1848)
