= Hyalostenele =

Scientific classification
- Kingdom: Animalia
- Phylum: Arthropoda
- Clade: Pancrustacea
- Class: Insecta
- Order: Lepidoptera
- Family: Geometridae
- Genus: Hyalostenele; Warren, 1894

Genus of moths

Hyalostenele is a genus of moths in the family Geometridae described by Warren in 1894.

== Species ==
- Hyalostenele lutescens (Butler, 1872)
- Hyalostenele oleagina (Warren, 1894)
