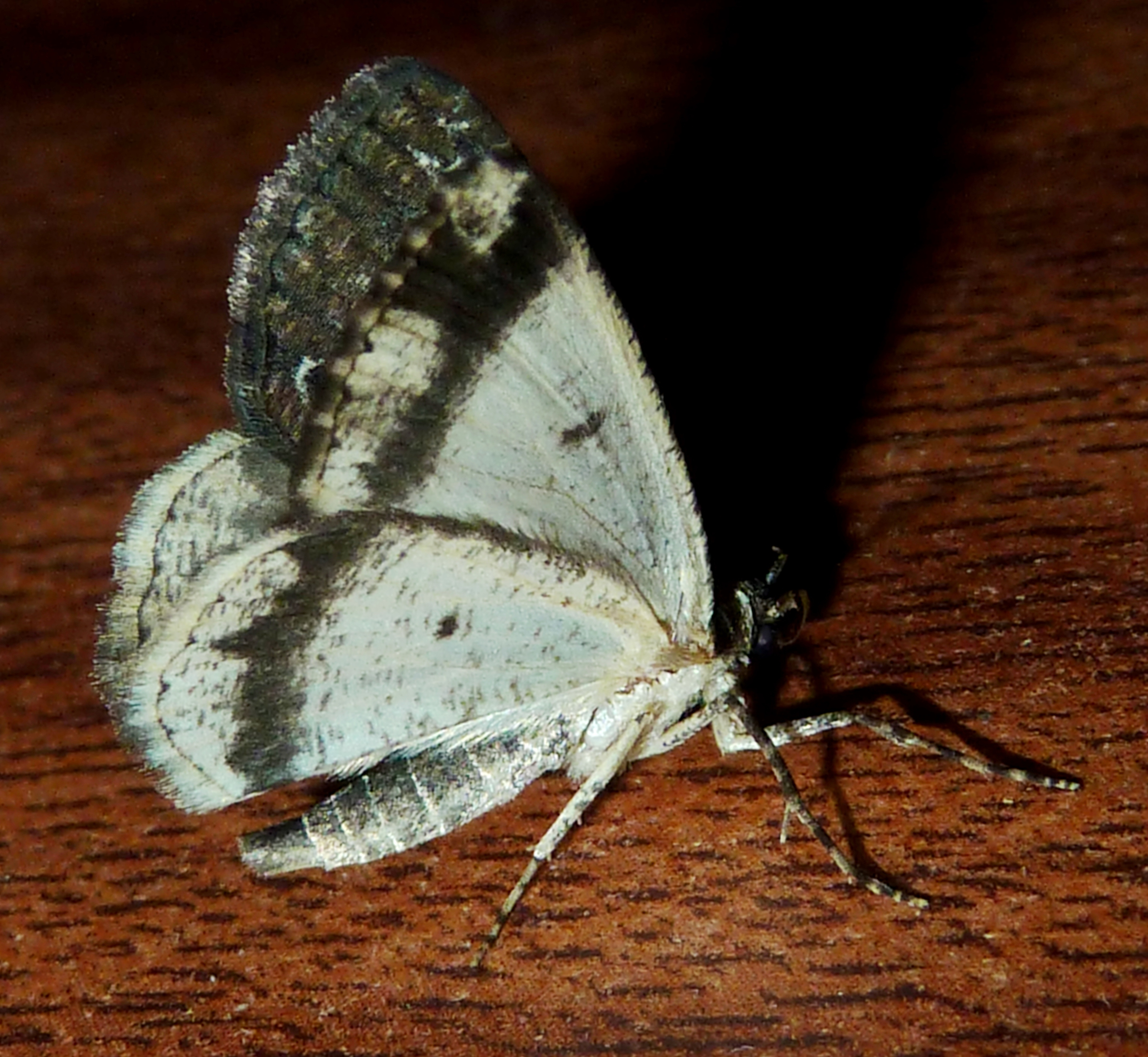
- Xylopteryx arcuata in South Africa

Scientific classification
- Kingdom: Animalia
- Phylum: Arthropoda
- Class: Insecta
- Order: Lepidoptera
- Family: Geometridae
- Genus: Xylopteryx; Guenée, 1857

= Xylopteryx =

Genus of moths

Xylopteryx is a genus of moths in the family Geometridae.
