= List of geometrid genera: R =

The very large moth family Geometridae contains genera beginning with A, B, C, D, E, F, G, H, I, J, K, L, M, N, O, P, Q, R, S, T, U, V, W, X, Y and Z.

Those beginning with R include:

- Racasta
- Rachela
- Racheolopha
- Racheospila
- Racotis
- Rambara
- Ramitia
- Ramobia
- Ratiaria
- Rectopis
- Remodes
- Rhabdotaedoeagus
- Rhadinomphax
- Rhanidopsis
- Rhaphidodemas
- Rheumaptera
- Rhinodia
- Rhinognophos
- Rhinoligia
- Rhinoprora
- Rhinura
- Rhipignophos
- Rhodesia
- Rhodochlora
- Rhodomena
- Rhodometra
- Rhodopan
- Rhodophthitus
- Rhodostrophia
- Rhombocentra
- Rhombochlora
- Rhomboptila
- Rhomborista
- Rhopalista
- Rhopalodes
- Rhopalognophos
- Rhoptria
- Rhuma
- Rhynchobapta
- Rhynchopsota
- Rikiosatoa
- Rindgenaria
- Rjabovana
- Rougeotiella
- Rucana
- Runeca
- Ruttellerona
