= Rhodesia alboviridata =

Scientific classification
- Kingdom: Animalia
- Phylum: Arthropoda
- Clade: Pancrustacea
- Class: Insecta
- Order: Lepidoptera
- Family: Geometridae
- Genus: Rhodesia
- Species: R. alboviridata

Binomial name
- Rhodesia alboviridata (Saalmüller, 1880)

Synonyms
- Comibaena alboviridata Saalmüller, 1880

Species of moth

Rhodesia alboviridata, the frosted emerald, is a species of moth of the family Geometridae first described by Max Saalmüller in 1880. It is found in southern Africa and Madagascar.

Known food plants of this species are Carissa edulis and Bauhinia variegata.
