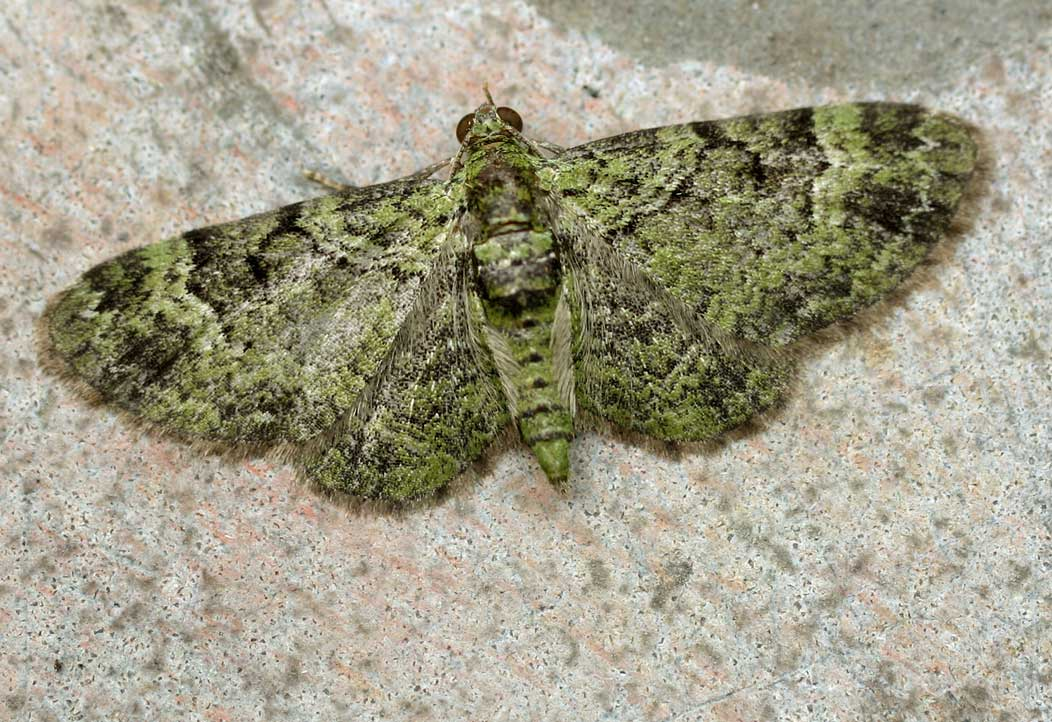

Scientific classification
- Kingdom: Animalia
- Phylum: Arthropoda
- Class: Insecta
- Order: Lepidoptera
- Family: Geometridae
- Genus: Pasiphila
- Species: P. rectangulata

Binomial name
- Pasiphila rectangulata (Linnaeus, 1758)

Synonyms
- Phalaena rectangulata Linnaeus, 1758; Rhinoprora rectangulata; Chloroclystis rectangulata; Geometra bischoffaria Geyer, 1838; Eupithecia griseata Staudinger, 1897; Pyralis mediana Panzer, 1804; Phalaena nigrosericeata Haworth, 1809; Eupithecia rectangularia Boisduval, 1840; Phalaena sericeata Haworth, 1809; Geometra subaerata Hubner, 1817; Phalaena viridulata Hufnagel, 1767

= Green pug =

Species of moth

The green pug (Pasiphila rectangulata) is a moth of the family Geometridae. It is sometimes placed in the genus Chloroclystis or Rhinoprora. It is common throughout the Palearctic region (from Ireland to Japan) and the Near East, but also appears in North America.

Typically this species has green wings with distinct dark bars but it can be quite variable and is often mostly dark brown with little green. The green coloration also fades over time. "Green, more or less dulled with black, the lines black, the postmedian forming sharper angles than in the two following (C. debiliata, C. agitata). Underside very sharply marked. - In ab. subaerata Hbn. the black markings are reduced, only the antemedian and the postmedian line developed. -In ab. cydoniata Bkh. the black is increased, particularly in the median area. - ab. cydoniata is entirely or almost entirely black."

It flies at night in June and July and is attracted to light.

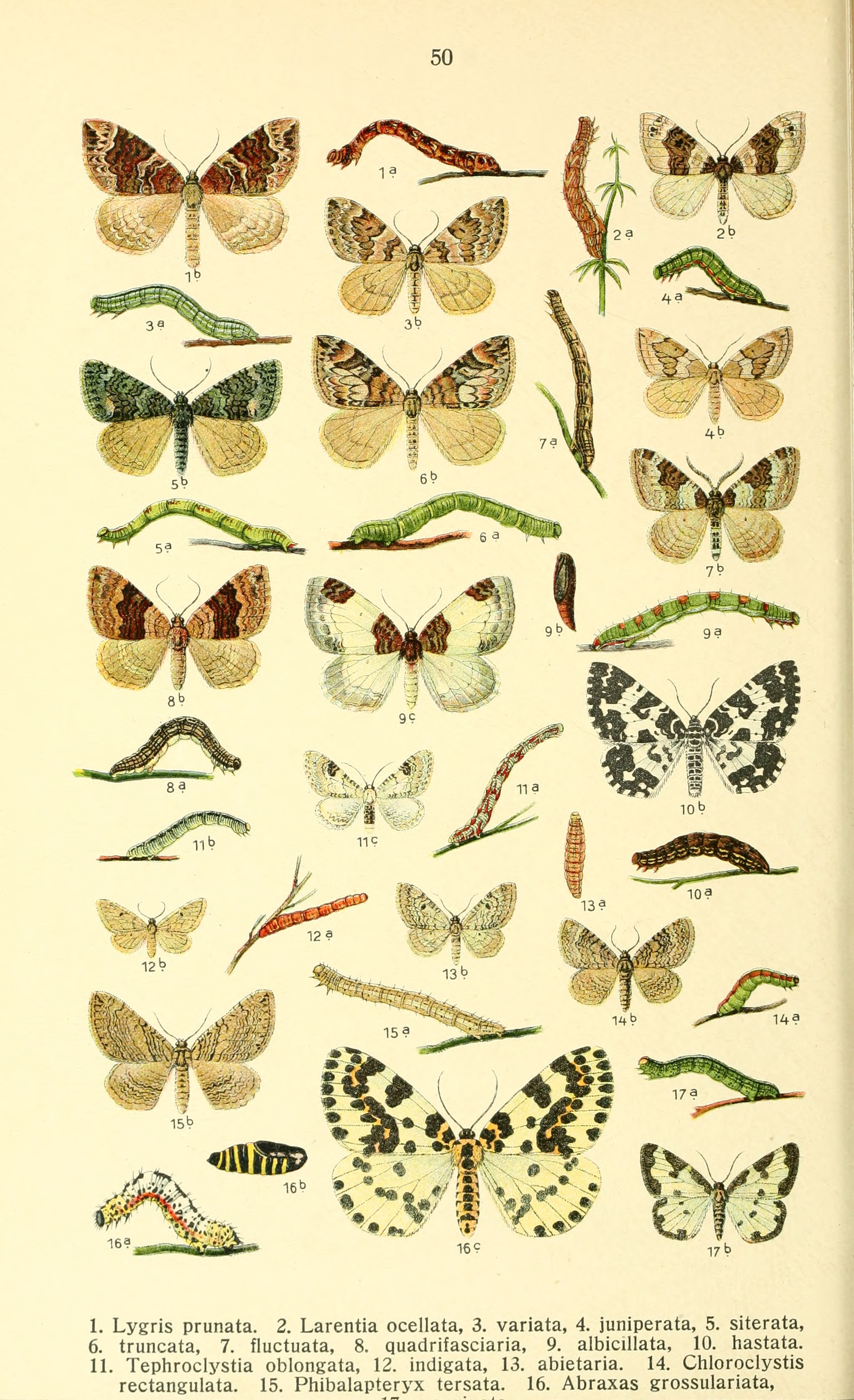
Plate from Eckstein Die Schmetterlinge Deutschlands depicting imago and larva figures 14, 14a

The stout larva is green with a reddish stripe and feeds on the flowers of various Rosaceae including apple, blackthorn, cherry, hawthorn, pear and quince. The species overwinters as an egg.
