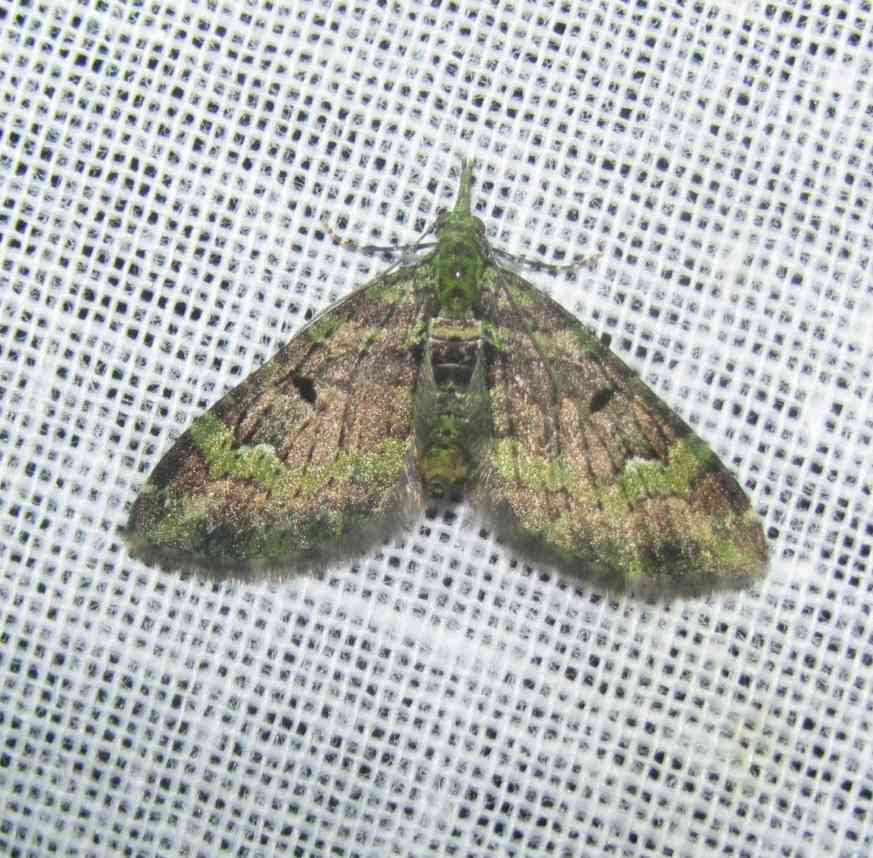

Scientific classification
- Kingdom: Animalia
- Phylum: Arthropoda
- Class: Insecta
- Order: Lepidoptera
- Family: Geometridae
- Genus: Rhinoprora
- Species: R. palpata

Binomial name
- Rhinoprora palpata (Walker, 1862)

Synonyms
- Cidaria palpata Walker, 1862; Pasiphila palpata; Eupithecia variegata Moore, 1887; Eupithecia virescens Moore, 1887; Chlorocystis palpata diechusa Prout, 1958; Chlorocystis palpata javana Prout, 1958; Chloroclystis palpata wongi Holloway, 1976

= Rhinoprora palpata =

Species of moth

Rhinoprora palpata is a moth in the family Geometridae. It is found in the Indian subregion, Sri Lanka and western China, as well as on Java, Borneo and Taiwan. The habitat consists of mountainous areas.

== Description ==
Its wingspan is about 24 mm. Palpi with second joint reaching far beyond the frontal tuft. Hindwings with vein 3 from before angle of cell. Hindwings lack tufts or fovea below lower angle of cell. Body grass green with black irrorations and more or less vinous reddish suffusion. Abdomen with black second segment. Forewings with veins speckled with black. A sub-basal line and an antemedial vinous and black band found with a line beyond it. The medial area vinous and black, with a black cell-spot and edged by black lines, the outer edge angled at veins 6 and 4 and with white between those points. There is a postmedial black specks series and a submarginal vinous band found with a black line on it and black inner edge, which outwardly edged by a crenulate white line. Cilia greenish and black. Hindwings with pale fuscous or whitish colored with traces of waved lines on outer area.

== Subspecies ==
- Rhinoprora palpata palpata nominate(India, Sri Lanka, western China)
- Rhinoprora palpata diechusa Prout, 1958
- Rhinoprora palpata javana Prout, 1958 (Java)
- Rhinoprora palpata wongi Holloway, 1976 (Borneo)
