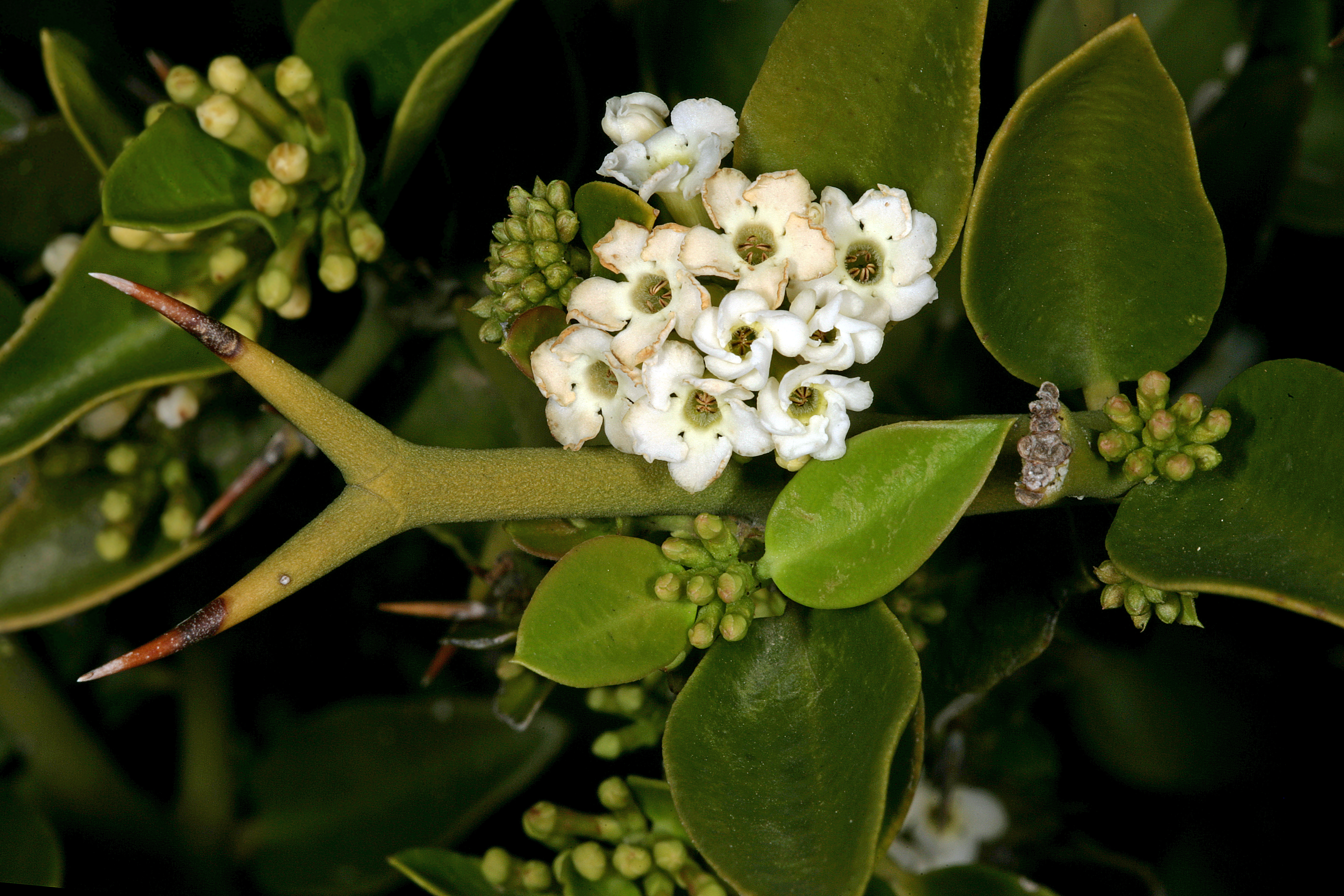

Scientific classification
- Kingdom: Plantae
- Clade: Tracheophytes
- Clade: Angiosperms
- Clade: Eudicots
- Clade: Asterids
- Order: Gentianales
- Family: Apocynaceae
- Genus: Carissa
- Species: C. haematocarpa

Binomial name
- Carissa haematocarpa (Eckl.) A.DC.

Synonyms
- Arduina ferox E.Mey.; Arduina haematocarpa Eckl.; Carissa ferox (E.Mey.) A.DC.; Jasminonerium ferox Kuntzel; Jasminonerium haematocarpum (Eckl.) Kuntzel

= Carissa haematocarpa =

Species of flowering plant

Carissa haematocarpa is a plant species in the form of a densely branched, spiny shrub or small tree, commonly known as Karoo num-num or Karoo noem-noem. This species is endemic to the dry savanna regions of southern Africa, including southern Namibia and the Cape Provinces of South Africa.

== Description ==
=== General morphology ===
Carissa haematocarpa typically grows to about 3 meters tall and may reach 4 meters under optimal conditions. The plant is densely branched, with widely spreading branches and strong spines that fork once or twice, forming a Y-thorn. These spines usually measure 2–5 cm in length, are green when young and turn woody brown with age. They occur in pairs at the tips of shoots and are long-lasting.Young stems are covered with trichome, while older bark is greenish and wrinkled. All parts of the plant exude a white latex when injured.

=== Leaves ===
The leaves of C. haematocarpa are opposite, shortly petiolate, and elliptic to ovate-elliptic in shape. Leaves measure approximately 1–4 cm in length. The upper surface is glossy dark green, while the underside is paler. The leaf texture is relatively thick and coarse, with an acute tip and a tapering base.

=== Flowers ===
The flowers of Carissa haematocarpa are small, white, and sweetly fragrant. They are arranged in small clusters known as cymes at the ends of branches and are usually nearly sessile. Their fragrance is often compared to gardenia or jasmine.Flowering mainly occurs from spring to summer in the Southern Hemisphere, approximately between October and March.

=== Fruit ===
The fruit of C. haematocarpa is a globose to subglobose berry, relatively small, about 5–10 mm in diameter. When ripe, the fruit is dark purple to black; the specific epithet haematocarpa means "blood-fruited" in Greek, referring to the characteristic reddish coloration before darkening. Unripe fruits contain latex and are inedible, but fully ripe fruits are edible with a sweet–sour taste. The ripe fruits serve as a food source for birds and small animals. Each fruit typically contains 1–2 irregularly elliptical seeds with a rough and hard seed coat.

== Distribution and habitat ==
This species occurs in southern Africa, from southern Namibia to the Western and Eastern Cape of South Africa, including the arid Karoo and semi-Karoo regions. Its primary habitats include:

- Dry shrublands (Karoo shrubland and Nama-Karoo)
- Semi-desert and arid areas
- Rocky slopes, sandy soils, and various soil types with pH 6–8

Like other species of the genus Carissa, Carissa haematocarpa is highly tolerant of drought, strong winds, and nutrient-poor soils, making it well adapted to extreme conditions in dry biomes.

== Propagation ==
Carissa haematocarpa can be propagated generatively by seed or vegetatively through stem cuttings. Growth is relatively slow; seed-grown plants typically require several years before flowering and fruiting. The species is highly tolerant of drought and unfavorable environmental conditions. Due to its dense growth and strong spines, it is often used as a natural living fence in dry regions.

== Chemical constituents ==
Like other species of the genus Carissa, C. haematocarpa contains various bioactive compounds, including terpenoid (such as pentacyclic triterpenoid), flavonoid, lignan, sterol, and latex rich in cardenolide.

== Traditional uses ==
Ripe fruits are eaten fresh by local communities or processed into food products (though they may stain teeth). The plant is used as an ornamental species, living hedge, soil stabilizer in dry areas, and as a forage source for wildlife during drought periods.

== Ecology ==
The flowers attract pollinator insects such as bees, butterflies, and other insects due to their fragrance. Ripe fruits are an important food source for birds and small mammals, which contribute to seed dispersal.

== Etymology ==
The name Carissa haematocarpa is composed of the genus name Carissa and the specific epithet haematocarpa.

- The genus Carissa etymologically derives from a plant name used in early botanical literature, likely originating from a local term applied to certain Carissa species in India, particularly in reference to Carissa carandas as the original source of the name. The term was later formally adopted for the entire genus of flowering plants.
- The specific epithet haematocarpa comes from Greek, where "haemato-" derives from the word αἷμα (haima) which means "blood" or "blood-colored," and "-carpa" from καρπός (karpos) which means "fruit." In literal, haematocarpa means "blood-fruited" or "red-fruited," referring to the characteristic coloration of the fruit produced by this species.
