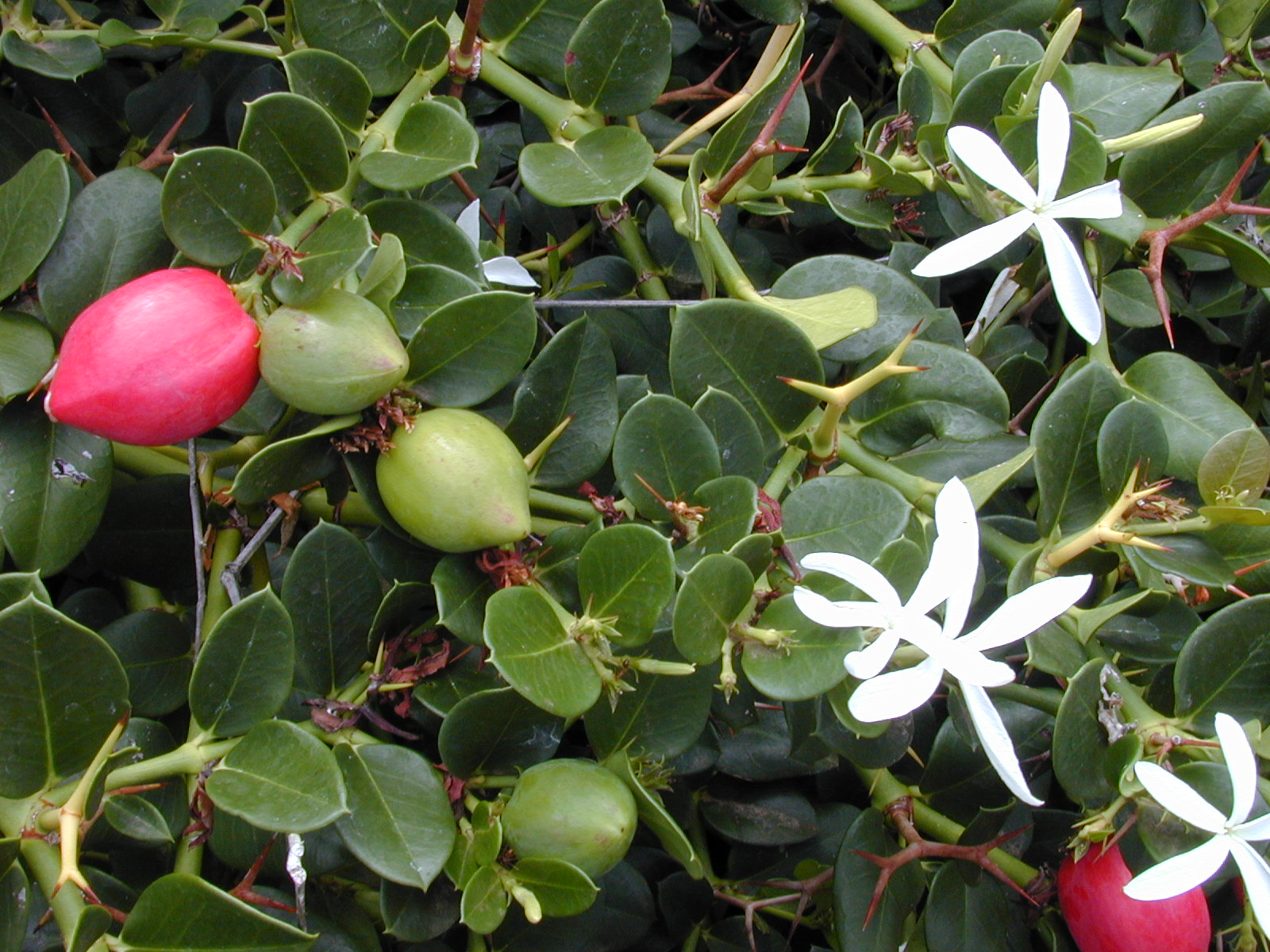
- Natal Plum (C. macrocarpa)

Scientific classification
- Kingdom: Plantae
- Clade: Tracheophytes
- Clade: Angiosperms
- Clade: Eudicots
- Clade: Asterids
- Order: Gentianales
- Family: Apocynaceae
- Tribe: Carisseae
- Genus: Carissa; L.

Synonyms
- Antura Forssk.; Arduina Mill.; Carandas Rumph. ex Adans.; Jasminonerium Wolf; Leioclusia Baill.

= Carissa =

Genus of plants

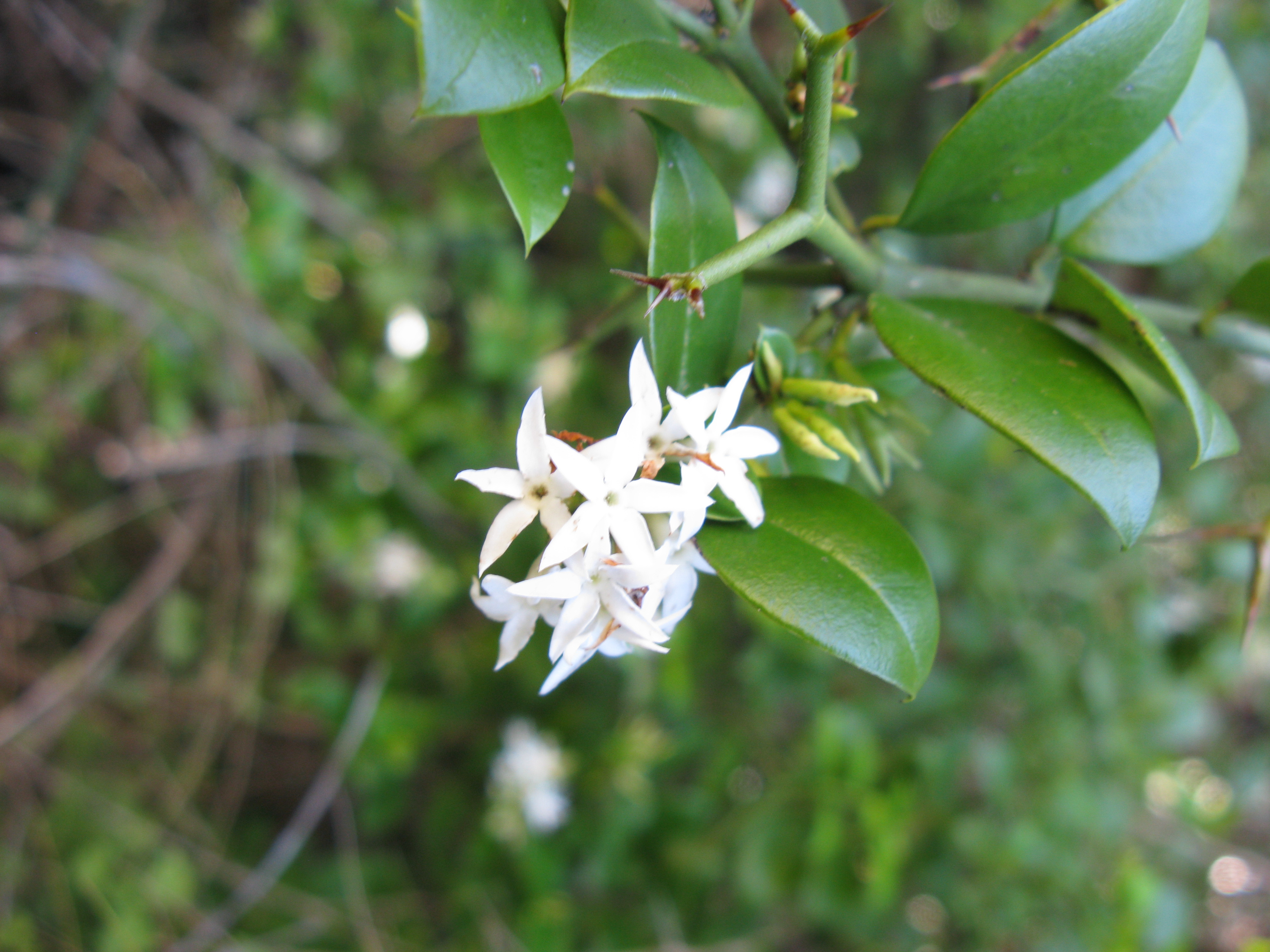
Carissa bispinosa, thorns and flowers

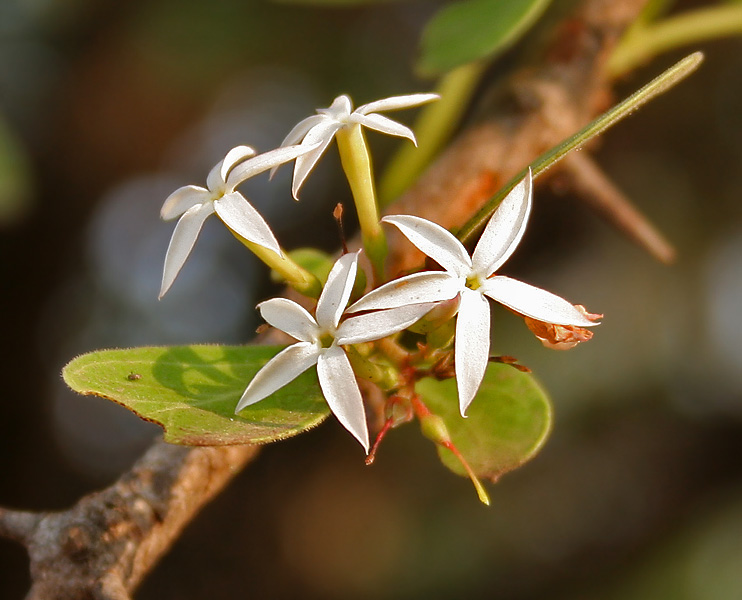
Conkerberry (C. spinarum) flowers in Shamirpet, Rangareddy district, Andhra Pradesh, India.

Carissa is a genus of shrubs or small trees native to tropical and subtropical regions of Africa, Australia and Asia. Until recently about 100 species were listed, but most of them have been relegated to the status of synonyms or assigned to other genera, such as Acokanthera.

== Description ==
Different species of Carissa grow as shrubs or trees, attaining respective heights of 2 to 10 m tall. They bear smooth, sharp thorns that often are formidable; they are true botanical thorns, being modified branches, morphologically speaking. The thorns may be simple, as in Carissa spinarum, dichotomously forked as in Carissa bispinosa, or dichotomously branched as in Carissa macrocarpa.

The leaves are a rich, glossy, waxy green, smooth, simple, entire and elliptic to ovate or nearly lanceolate. They are 2–8 cm long, partly depending on the species, and generally are thick and leathery. In suitable climates some species flower through most of the year. The flowers are nearly sessile, 1–5 cm diameter, with a five-lobed white or pink-tinged corolla. They may be solitary or borne in clusters in an umbel or corymb. The flowers of some species some have a fragrance reminiscent of Gardenia, which adds to their popularity as garden plants. The fruit is a plum-like berry in the shape of a prolate spheroid, like that of a rugby ball. In colour they vary according to species. In some species they are red when ripe, whereas others turn a glossy purple-black. Typically they are 1.5–6 cm in length, and usually contain 1-4 flat brown seeds, but up to 16 in some species.

== Fruit ==
The fruit of the carissa is an oblong berry which contains numerous small seeds. The green fruit is poisonous, sometimes dangerously so, as is the entire plant; however, the ripe fruits are edible (though possibly tart), with some species having fruity flavors and overtones of strawberry or apple. One single fruit contains around 52 mg of potassium, 7 mg vitamin C, 2.2 mg calcium, 3.2 mg magnesium and 1.4 mg phosphorus. In its native range, the ripened fruits of C. macrocarpa are especially relished by local peoples, eaten raw or used to make jelly, sweets or candies. Numerous species of birds and mammals, and some herbivorous reptiles, are drawn to the vivid red Carissa fruits, consuming them and distributing the seed.

Carissa carandas is cultivated in several Asiatic countries for its fruit, which is variously used in cooking, confectionaries and in folk medicine (see article).

== Horticulture ==
Carissa species generally respond well to gardening and are valued in topiary and in forming strong, dense, decorative, thorny, flowering hedges. Some sprawling varieties are useful as ground covers. Carissa species are grown from seed or cuttings and tolerate slight frost.

== Species ==
The following species are recognised.

1. Carissa bispinosa (L.) Desf. ex Brenan - widespread in E + S Africa from Kenya to Cape Province
2. Carissa boiviniana (Baill.) Leeuwenb. - Madagascar
3. Carissa carandas L. - India, Bangladesh; naturalized in S China, Mauritius, Nepal, Pakistan, Indochina, Java, Philippines, West Indies
4. Carissa haematocarpa (Eckl.) A.DC. - Namibia, Cape Province of South Africa
5. Carissa macrocarpa (Eckl.) A.DC. - Kenya + Zaire south to Cape Province; naturalized in S China, Ascension Island, Hawaii, Florida, Texas, Mexico, Central America, West Indies
6. Carissa pichoniana Leeuwenb. - Madagascar
7. Carissa spinarum L. - Africa, Arabian Peninsula, Indian Subcontinent, Indochina, New Guinea, New Caledonia, Australia
8. Carissa tetramera (Sacleux) Stapf - E + S Africa from Kenya to KwaZulu-Natal
9. Carissa andamanensis L.J.Singh & Murugan - S Andaman Islands
10. Carissa kopilii Barbhuiya, J.Sarma & S.Dey - Assam, NE India
11. Carissa lanceolata R.Br. - Northern Territory, Queensland, South Australia, Western Australia
12. Carissa laxiflora Benth. - New Guinea, Queensland
13. Carissa ovata R.Br. - New Caledonia, New Guinea, New South Wales, Northern Territory, Queensland, Western Australia
14. Carissa scabra R.Br. - Queensland
15. Carissa sebrabergensis van Jaarsv. & Swanepoel

Formerly included

- Acokanthera oblongifolia (Hochst.) Codd (as C. oblongifolia Hochst.)
- Acokanthera schimperi (A.DC.) Benth. & Hook.f. ex Schweinf. (as C. schimperi A.DC.)
