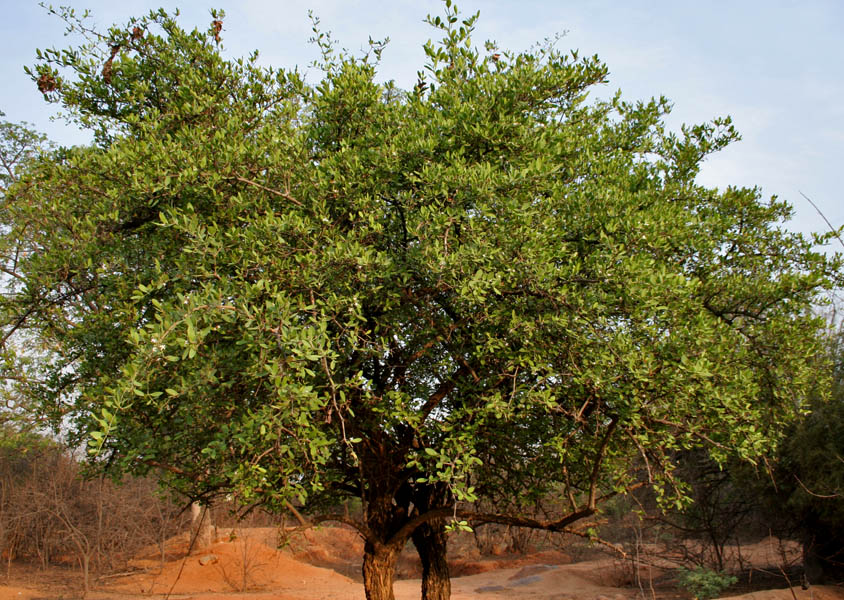

Conservation status
- Least Concern (IUCN 3.1)

Scientific classification
- Kingdom: Plantae
- Clade: Tracheophytes
- Clade: Angiosperms
- Clade: Eudicots
- Clade: Asterids
- Order: Gentianales
- Family: Apocynaceae
- Genus: Carissa
- Species: C. spinarum

Binomial name
- Carissa spinarum L.

Synonyms
- Numerous, see text

= Carissa spinarum =

Species of shrub

Carissa spinarum, the conkerberry or bush plum, is a large shrub of the dogbane family (Apocynaceae), widely distributed in tropical regions of Africa, Southern Asia, Australia, and various islands of the Indian Ocean. It is most well known in Australia, where it is also called currant bush or, more ambiguously, native currant or even black currant. It is, however, neither closely related to plums (Prunus) nor to true currants (Ribes), which belong to entirely different lineages of eudicots. In India, it is also called wild karanda/wild karavanda, referring to the related karanda (C. carandas). Carissa spinarum is often discussed under its many obsolete synonyms (see below).

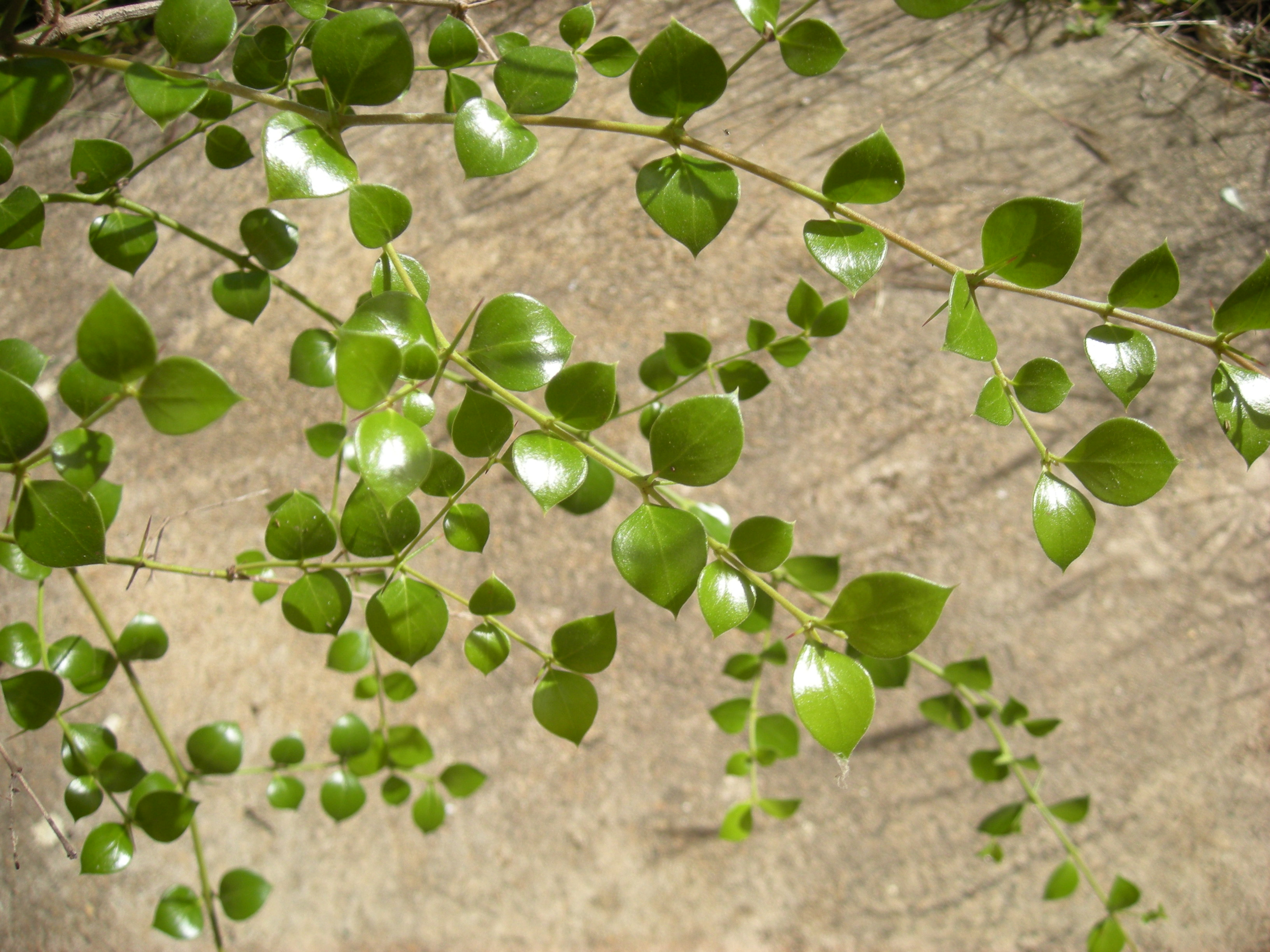
Foliage of the small-leaved "ovata" type

It grows as a multi-stemmed shrub, 0.5 to 3 m (1.6 to 9.8 ft) in height. The leaves are glossy green, opposite, narrow ovate to lanceolate and 1–5 cm (0.4–2.0 in) in length. The branches bear thorns of 1–3 cm (0.4–1.2 in) length. White, star-shaped flowers about 1 cm (0.4 in) across are followed by ovate green berries, 1–2 cm (0.4–0.8 in) in length, which turn black or dark purple when ripe.

== Ecology ==
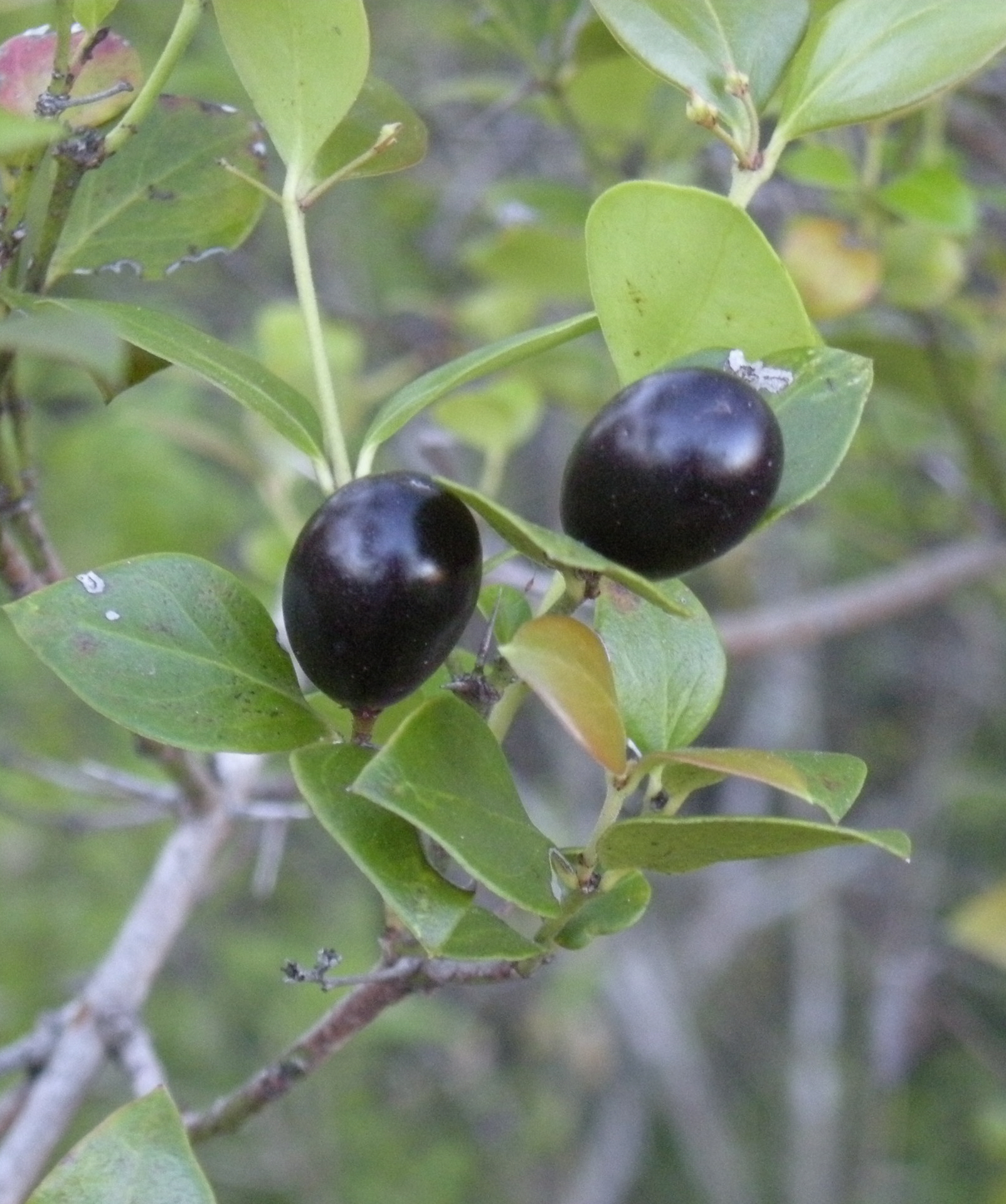
Ripe fruit

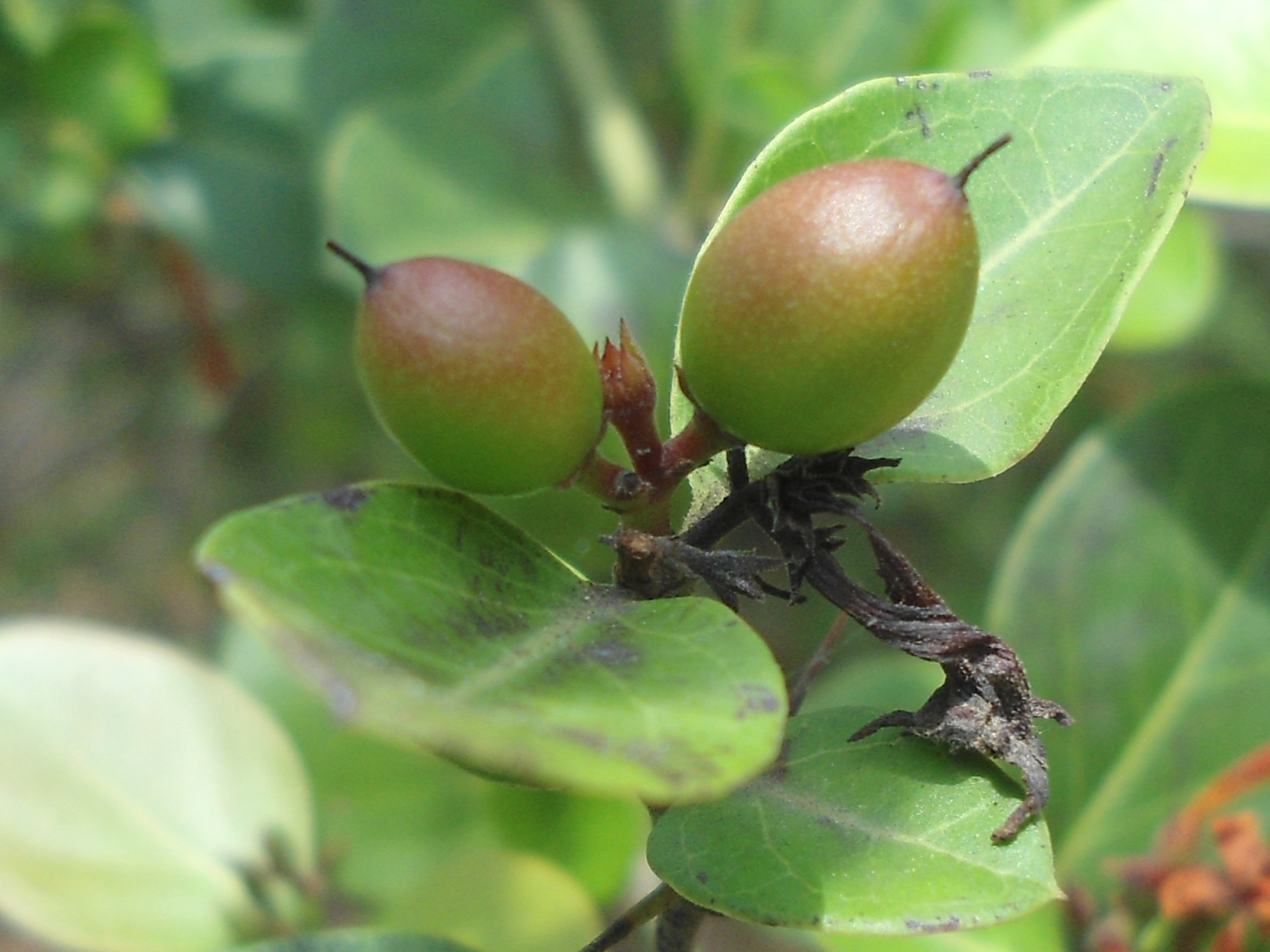
Unripe fruit

Carissa spinarum is most often found in semiarid coastal regions on fine-textured soils such as clays and clay-loams; in more arid regions the plant tends to be confined to areas of higher moisture such as at the base of hills or floodout areas. But it has a high ecological tolerance and can live in a wide range of habitats. In Australia for example, it is often found in association with Eucalyptus brownii, poplar box (E. populnea), gidgee (Acacia cambagei) or brigalow (A. harpophylla), in coastal rainforest, gallery forest and vine thickets in regions receiving in excess of 900 mm (35 in) annual rainfall, as well as softwood scrubs and open eucalypt savannas receiving less than 700 mm (28 in) annual rainfall.

Conkerberries are edible, but only when fully ripe; they have a sweet flavour, but the milky sap of this plant – and its unripe fruit – is poisonous, as typical for the Apocynaceae. They are a popular bush tucker food for Australian Aborigines in Central Australia. The fruit is known as merne arrankweye in the Arrernte language, anwekety in Anmatyerr and nganango in Pintupi. The fruits are also a popular food for the Australian bustard, emu and many other birds in its range. Its leaves provide food for butterflies (e.g. Australian crow, Euploea core) and moths (e.g. some hawkmoths)

Carissa spinarum is frequently a weed in grazing land in northern Australia, choking out grasses, reducing the ability of livestock to feed, interfering with stock handling and providing a refuge for vermin. The plant is capable of reproducing rapidly by layering and is difficult to control mechanically and expensive to manage with herbicides. On the other hand, it has been used in attempts to restore small-bird habitat in disturbed dry rainforest in Queensland, Australia.

Parts of the plant are used medicinally for joint and muscle pain by the Maasai people of Kenya.

Fruit extracts from the plant have shown antioxidant and also antidiabetic properties.

== Synonyms ==
Well known for its fruit to locals and quite variable across its wide range and diverse habitat types, the conkerberry has been described time and again by botanists under a number of names. Robert Brown alone described it no less than four times under different names, and R.H. Beddome not only described it twice as a "new species" of Carissa, but believed two other growth-forms of it to be mere varieties of Karonda (C. carandas). The 1889 book 'The Useful Native Plants of Australia records the plant under the name Carissa Ovata and says "This little bush produces a very pleasant fruit, which is both agreeable and wholesome. It is like a sloe, egg-shaped, and about half-an-inch long. It exudes a viscid milky juice and contains a few woody seeds. "I can testify that the fruit is both agreeable and wholesome, and I never knew an instance of any evil consequences, even when they were partaken of most abundantly." (Tenison-Woods, Vol. vii., 571., Proc. Lirin. Soc. N.S.W.)".

But in fact, C. spinarum was already named by Carl Linnaeus in his 1771 Mantissa Plantarum, and thus all subsequent names are treated as junior synonyms. In Myanmar, it is known as Burmese: ခံစပ်, MLCTS: hkang sap.

The following list gives the names under which the conkerberry has been placed in Carissa. Apart from that, it has also been assigned, under various names, to Antura and Arduina (both now synonymized with Carissa), as well as Azima, Cabucala, Chapelieria, Damnacanthus, Strychnos, Carandas, and Jasminonerium.

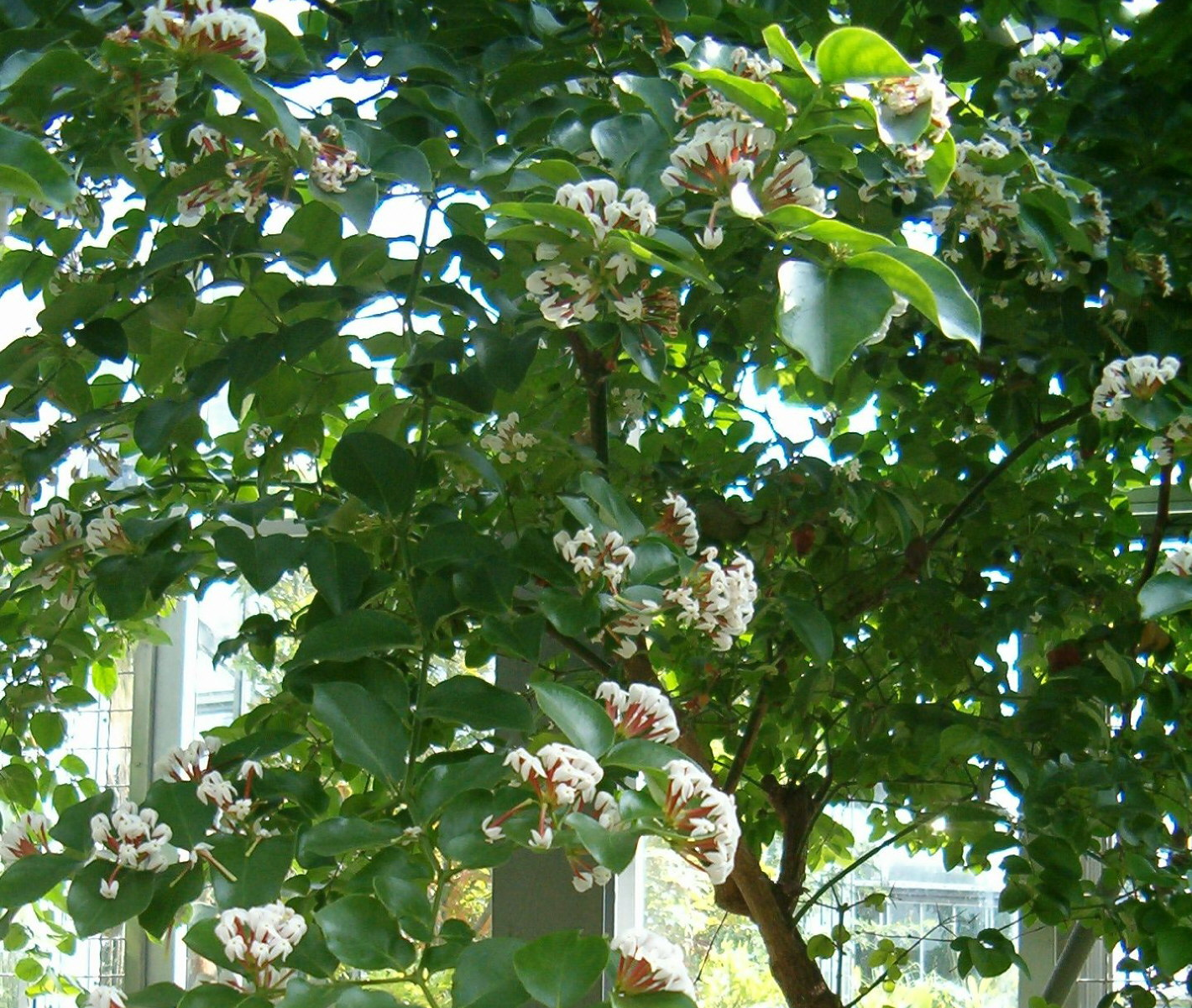
"Edulis"-type habitus

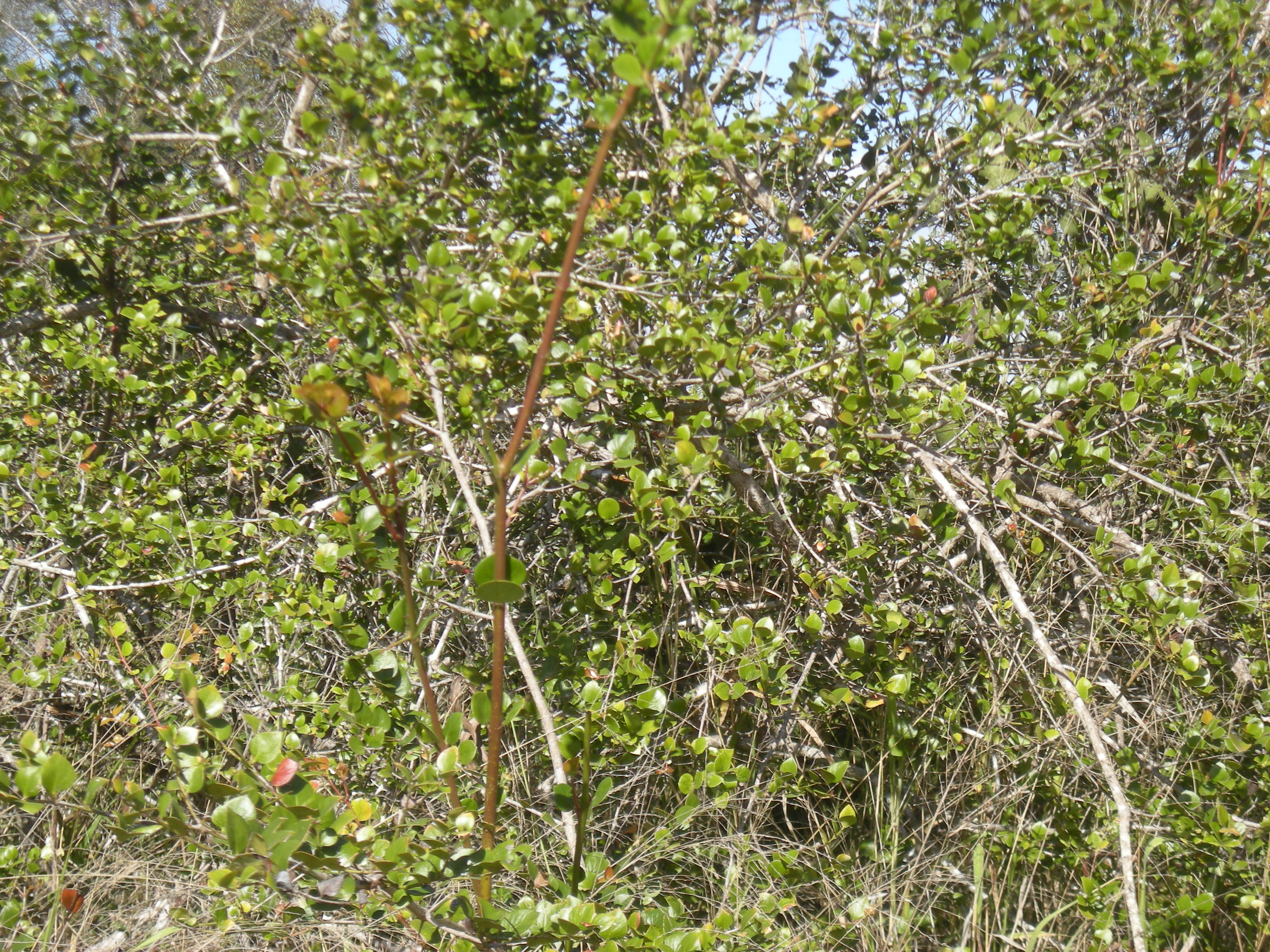
"Ovata"-type habitus

- Carissa abyssinica R.Br.
- Carissa africana A.DC.
- Carissa axillaris Roxb.
- Carissa brownii F.Muell.
- Carissa campenonii (Drake) Palacky
- Carissa candolleana Jaub. & Spach
- Carissa carandas var. congesta (Wight) Bedd.
- Carissa carandas var. paucinervia (A.DC.) Bedd.
- Carissa cochinchinensis Pierre ex Pit.
- Carissa comorensis (Pichon) Markgr.
- Carissa congesta Wight
- Carissa coriacea Wall.
- Carissa cornifolia Jaub. & Spach
- Carissa dalzellii Bedd.
- Carissa densiflora Baker
- Carissa diffusa Roxb.
- Carissa dulcis Schumach. & Thonn.
- Carissa edulis (Forssk.) Vahl

C. edulis var. septentrionalis is probably a valid species, Carissa septentrionalis

- Carissa hirsuta Roth
- Carissa horrida Pichon
- Carissa inermis Vahl
- Carissa lanceolata R.Br.
- Carissa laxiflora Benth.
- Carissa macrophylla Wall.
- Carissa madagascariensis Thouars ex Poir.
- Carissa obovata Markgr.
- Carissa oleoides Markgr.
- Carissa ovata R.Br.
- Carissa paucinervia A.DC.
- Carissa pilosa Schinz
- Carissa pubescens A.DC.
- Carissa revoluta Scott-Elliot
- Carissa richardiana Jaub. & Spach
- Carissa scabra R.Br.
- Carissa sechellensis Baker
- Carissa suavissima Bedd. ex Hook.f.
- Carissa tomentosa A.Rich.
- Carissa villosa Roxb.
- Carissa xylopicron Thouars
- Carissa yunnanensis Tsiang & P.T.Li
