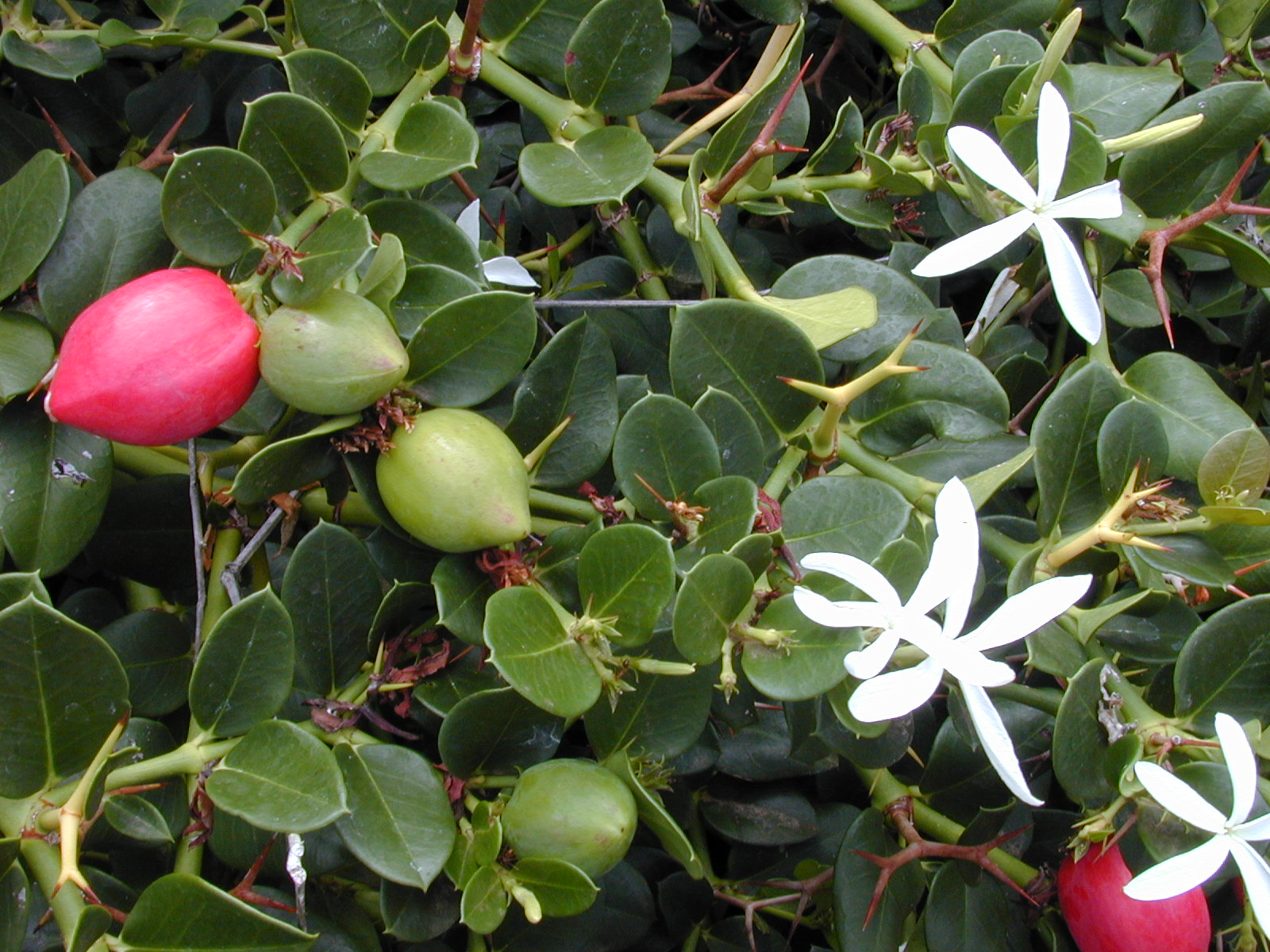

Conservation status
- Least Concern (IUCN 3.1)

Scientific classification
- Kingdom: Plantae
- Clade: Tracheophytes
- Clade: Angiosperms
- Clade: Eudicots
- Clade: Asterids
- Order: Gentianales
- Family: Apocynaceae
- Genus: Carissa
- Species: C. macrocarpa

Binomial name
- Carissa macrocarpa (Eckl.) A.DC.

Synonyms
- Carissa grandiflora (E.Mey.) A.DC.

= Carissa macrocarpa =

Species of shrub

Carissa, (natal-plum), raw
Nutritional value per 100 g (3.5 oz)
- Energy: 259 kJ (62 kcal)
- Carbohydrates: 13.63 g
- Fat: 1.3 g
- Protein: 0.5 g
Vitamins and minerals
Vitamins	Quantity %DV^{†}
Thiamine (B1)	3% 0.04 mg
Riboflavin (B2)	5% 0.06 mg
Niacin (B3)	1% 0.2 mg
Vitamin C	42% 38 mg
Minerals	Quantity %DV^{†}
Calcium	1% 11 mg
Iron	7% 1.31 mg
Magnesium	4% 16 mg
Phosphorus	1% 7 mg
Potassium	9% 260 mg
Sodium	0% 3 mg
- Other constituents: Quantity
- Water: 84.17 g
- Link to USDA Database entry
- ^{†}Percentages estimated using US recommendations for adults, except for potassium, which is estimated based on expert recommendation from the National Academies.

Carissa macrocarpa is a shrub native to tropical and southern Africa. It is commonly known as the Natal plum, amathungulu, big num-num or large num-num.

Carissa macrocarpa deals well with salt-laden winds, making it a good choice for coastal areas. It is commonly found in the coastal bush of the Eastern Cape and Natal. It produces shiny, deep green leaves and snowy white flowers whose perfumed scent intensifies at night. Like other Carissa species, C. macrocarpa is a spiny, evergreen shrub containing latex. They bloom for months at a time. The ornamental plump, round, crimson fruit appears in summer and fall (autumn) at the same time as the blooms. In moderate, coastal areas the fruits appear through the year. The fruit can be eaten out of hand or made into pies, jams, jellies, and sauces. Some claim that other than the fruit, the plant is poisonous. However, this claim is a myth, possibly based on similarities to other plants with milky sap. The College of Agricultural and Environmental Sciences at University of California, Davis rates the plant as mildly toxic. It appears in the South African National tree list as number 640.3.

A traditional food plant in Africa, this fruit is said to have the potential of improving nutrition, boosting food security, fostering rural development and supporting sustainable landcare.

== Taxonomy ==
Danish naturalist Christian Friedrich Ecklon described the Natal plum.

== Distribution ==
Carissa macrocarpa grows mainly in coastal areas of South Africa. It can be found on sand dunes and on the edges of coastal forests in the Eastern Cape and northwards to Natal and Mozambique. The species also occurs in Zambia and Zimbabwe and further north in the Democratic Republic of the Congo and Kenya. Today the plant is also grown commonly in southern Florida and is cultivated in southern California and used widely as an ornamental in Hawaii, Central America and the Caribbean.

== Horticultural aspects ==
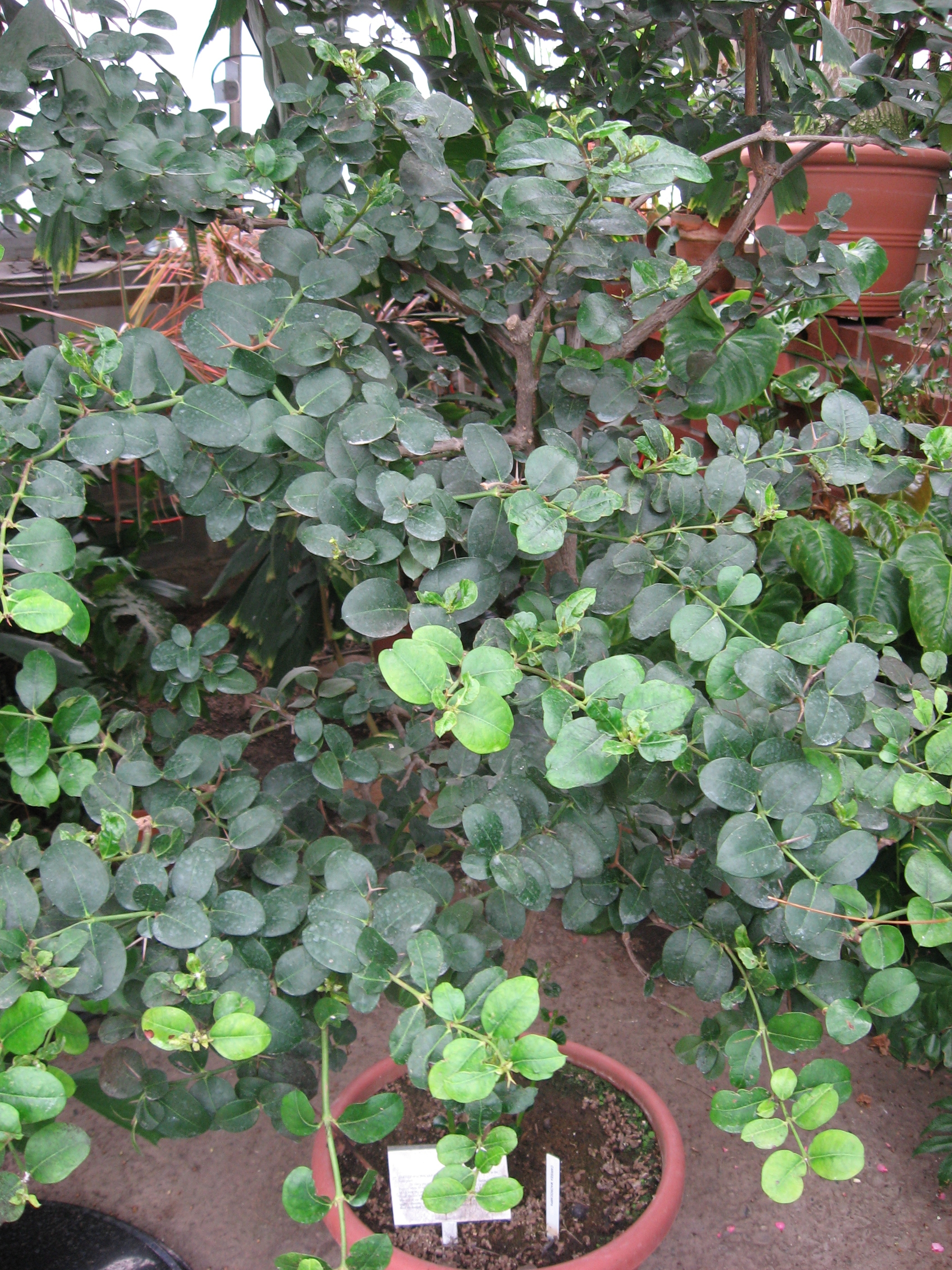
Natal plum shrub

=== Propagation ===
Carissa macrocarpa is quite easy to grow. Its seeds germinate two to four weeks after sowing. The development of the seedlings is very slow at first. Plants cultivated from seeds bear fruits within the first two years. A vegetative propagation is possible and preferred. The most efficient method consists of notching young branchlets by cutting them halfway through. Then they are bent downwards and allowed to hang limply. After the young branchlets have built a callus, in approximately two months, the cutting has to be removed from the parent and planted in sand under moderate shade. Roots form within one month. Carissa macrocarpa will produce fruit within two years of applying this reproduction method.

=== Fertilizing ===
The maintenance of Carissa macrocarpa is simple. The plant is indigenous to South Africa and does not need fertilizer.

=== Pollination ===
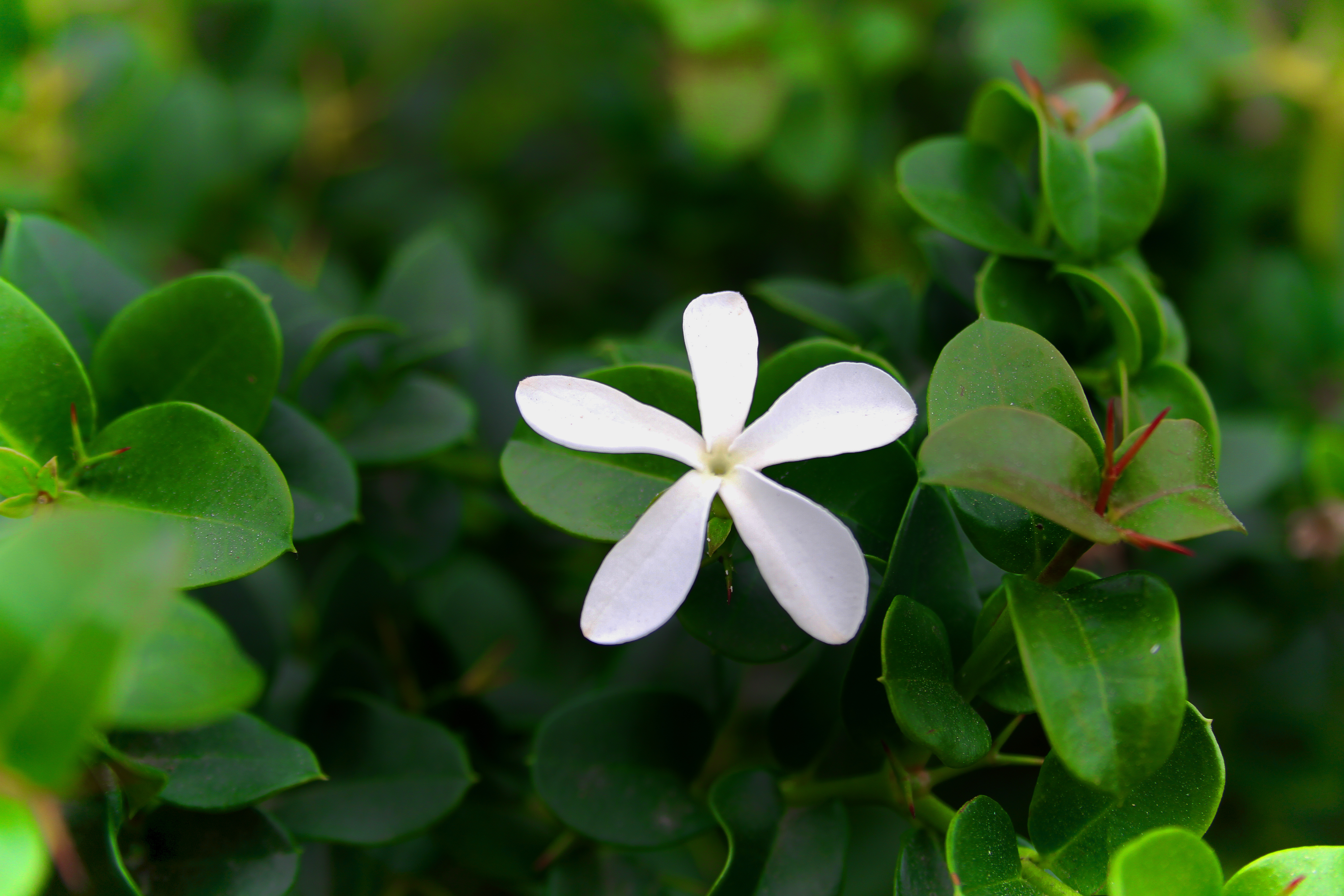
Close-up of flower

In the homeland of Carissa macrocarpa night-flying insects pollinates the white, bisexual flowers. Out of its origin area unfruitfulness has been attributed to inadequate pollination. However, hand pollination is possible and in future poor pollination could be avoided by cultivation of floral structures that are highly favourable for self-fertilization.

=== Orchard design ===
Narrow hedges are recommended as orchard design for Carissa macrocarpa due to its prickles. Like this the access to the fruits which are growing on the top of the bush is much simpler. Pruning the plant is beneficial because it induces the development of more fruiting tips. Beyond cutting, little pruning work has to be done to restrain the bush from massive growth. This results in an increasing amount of fruits per plant.

=== Harvesting ===
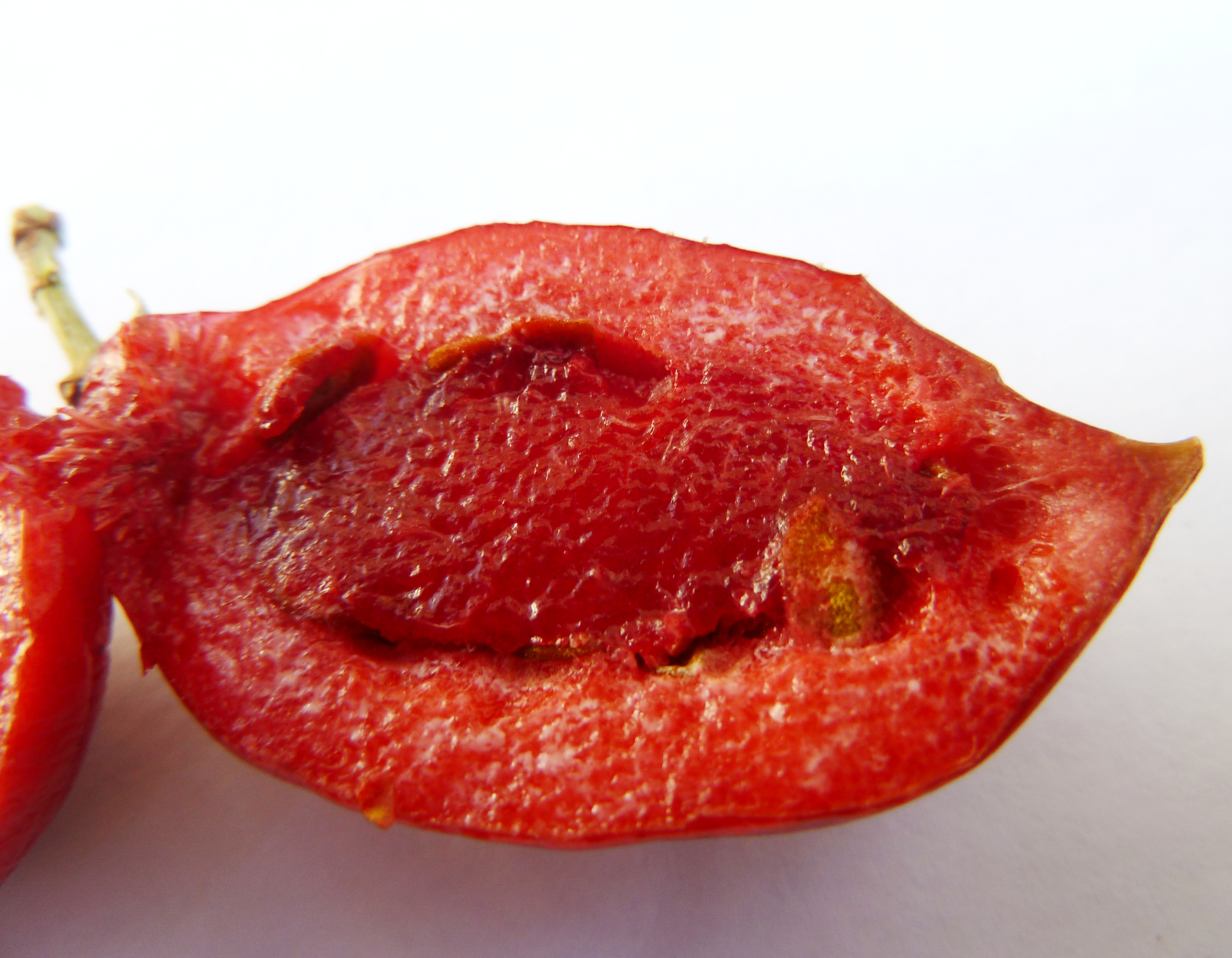
Longitudinal section of a ripe fruit

With a minimal yield of 3 tons per hectare under commercial production in South Africa, the productivity is considered as high. The main fruit production is in summer with slightly varying ripening times. So each fruit must be picked when it is ripe. Under good growing conditions the plant also produces many fruits during the off-season. During the harvest attention must be paid to the ripe fruits' skin as it can be easily bruised and is highly perishable.

=== Cultivars for crop production ===
Horticultural scientists in South Africa and the USA (Florida and California) have selected and named several Carissa types that tend to produce fruits more reliably. The fruits are larger, have a good texture and contain fewer seeds. In California they selected Fancy (many large fruits with few seeds), Torrey Pines (good crop production and abundant pollen), Frank (good pollen supplier but low yield), Chelsey and Serena. In Florida Gifford is one of the best fruit bearers. In Africa C. haematocarpa is defined suitable for drier areas and C. bispinosa for higher altitudes.

== Environmental requirements ==
Carissa macrocarpa requires warm, moist subtropical climate. It tolerates different exposures as full sun and fairly heavy shade. As a coastal plant it can deal very well with salty ocean spray.

Factor	Description
Rainfall	Up to 1000 mm/a
Drought	Drought-resistant and no watering requirements during summer rainfall areas
Altitude	1000 m a.s.l. (Eswatini); likely up to 1500 m.
Cold	Cold-tolerant to -5 °C; young plants needs protection
Warmth	Up to 32 °C in the shade (Pretoria); best growth in full sun exposure
Soil	Any (limestone, heavy clay, sand) if it drains well
Salinity	Salt-tolerant (5000 ppm)
