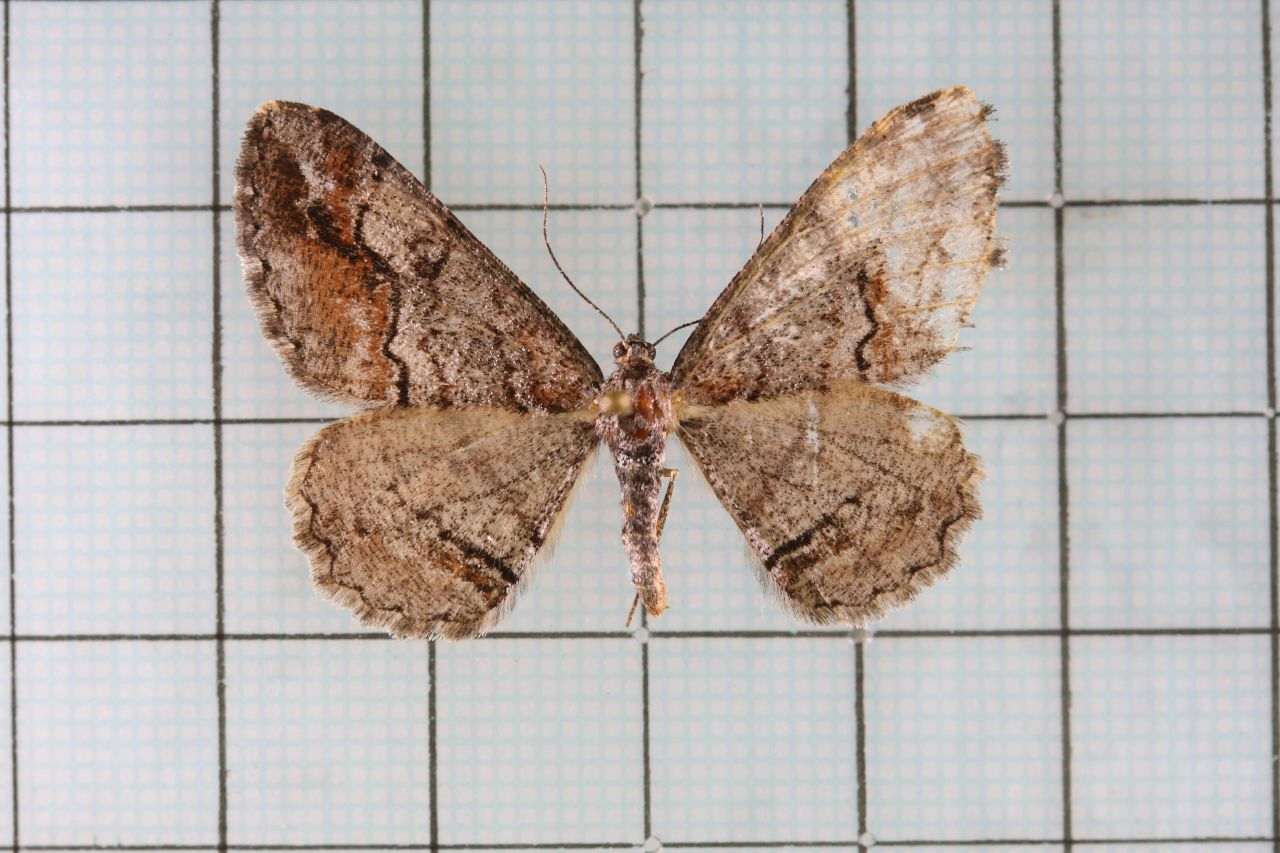
- Female
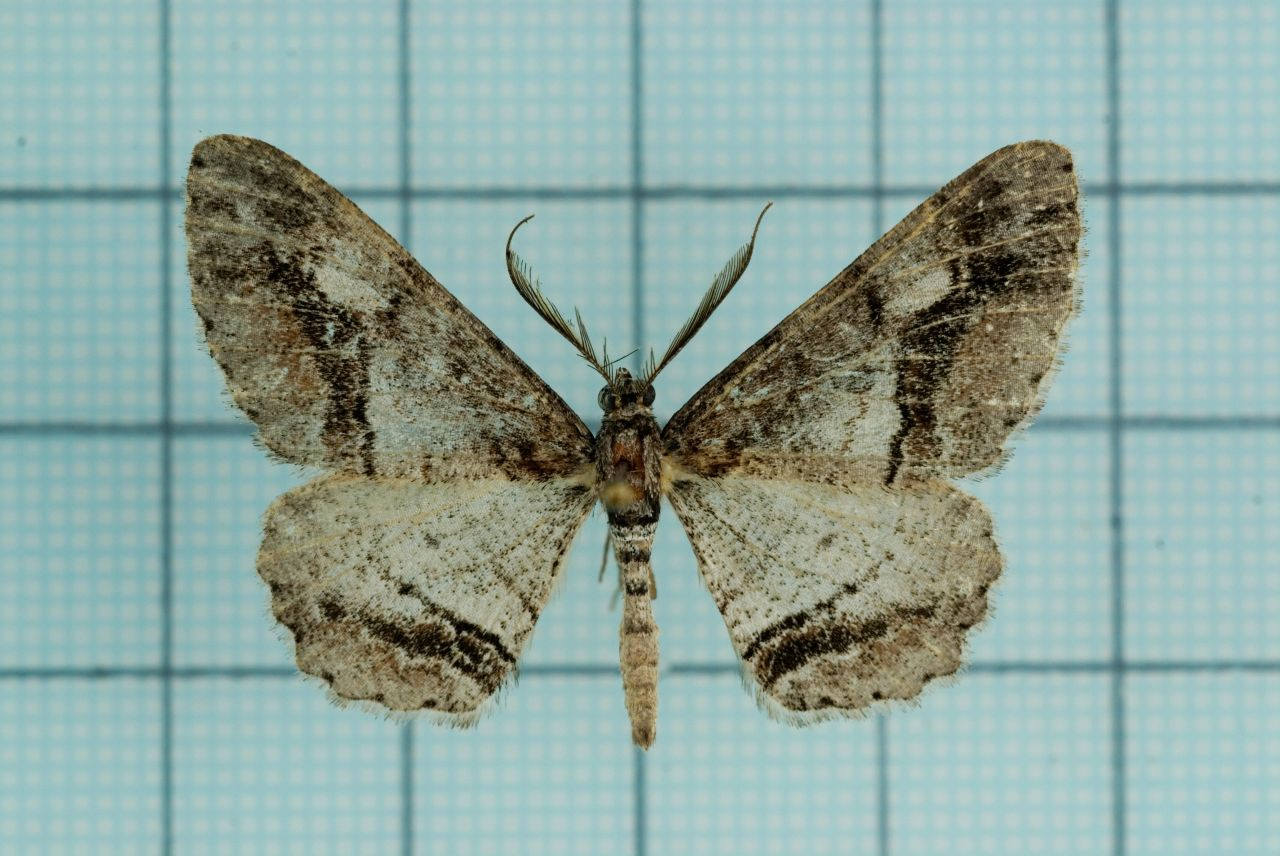
- Male

Scientific classification
- Kingdom: Animalia
- Phylum: Arthropoda
- Class: Insecta
- Order: Lepidoptera
- Family: Geometridae
- Genus: Rikiosatoa
- Species: R. fucataria

Binomial name
- Rikiosatoa fucataria (Wileman, 1911)

Synonyms
- Alcis fucataria Wileman, 1911; Boarmia aperta Bastelberger, 1911

= Rikiosatoa fucataria =

Species of moth

Rikiosatoa fucataria is a species of moth of the family Geometridae first described by Wileman in 1911. It is found in Taiwan.

The wingspan is 38–43 mm.
