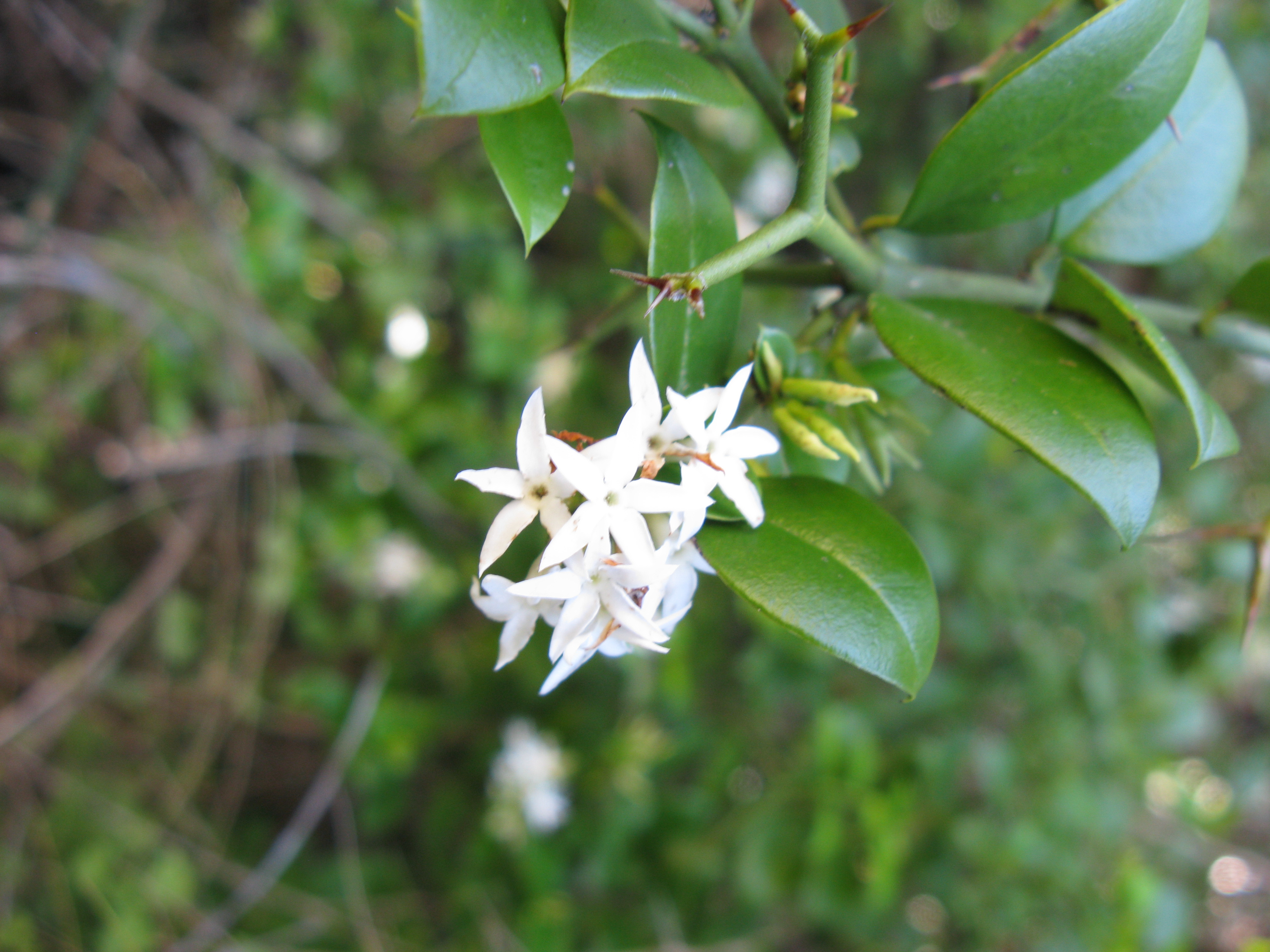

Conservation status
- Least Concern (IUCN 3.1)

Scientific classification
- Kingdom: Plantae
- Clade: Embryophytes
- Clade: Tracheophytes
- Clade: Spermatophytes
- Clade: Angiosperms
- Clade: Eudicots
- Clade: Asterids
- Order: Gentianales
- Family: Apocynaceae
- Genus: Carissa
- Species: C. bispinosa

Binomial name
- Carissa bispinosa (L.) Desf. ex Brenan

Synonyms
- List: Arduina bispinosa L.; Jasminonerium bispinosum (L.) Kuntze; Arduina acuminata E.Mey.; Arduina erythrocarpa Eckl.; Arduina megaphylla Gand.; Carissa acuminata (E.Mey.) A.DC.; Carissa cordata Dinter; Carissa erythrocarpa (Eckl.) A.DC.; Carissa myrtoides Desf.; Carissa sessiliflora Brongn. ex Pichon; Carissa wyliei N.E.Br.; Jasminonerium acuminatum (E.Mey.) Kuntze; Jasminonerium erythrocarpum (Eckl.) Kuntze; Lycium cordatum Mill.

= Carissa bispinosa =

Species of plant

Carissa bispinosa grows as a shrub or small tree up to 5 metres (16 ft) tall. Its fragrant flowers feature a white corolla. The fruit is red when ripe. Its habitat is woodland and forest from 1,080 m (3,540 ft) to 1,630 m (5,350 ft) elevation. Vernacular names for the plant include forest num-num and Y-thorned carissa. Carissa bispinosa is native to an area from Uganda to South Africa.
