= Rhinoprora oribates =

Scientific classification
- Kingdom: Animalia
- Phylum: Arthropoda
- Clade: Pancrustacea
- Class: Insecta
- Order: Lepidoptera
- Family: Geometridae
- Genus: Rhinoprora
- Species: R. oribates

Binomial name
- Rhinoprora oribates Prout, 1925

Synonyms
- Pasiphilodes oribates; Chloroclystis oribates; Pasiphila oribates

Species of moth

Rhinoprora oribates is a moth in the family Geometridae. It is found on Java.

The wingspan is about 26 mm.
