= Rhodophthitus tricoloraria =

Scientific classification
- Kingdom: Animalia
- Phylum: Arthropoda
- Clade: Pancrustacea
- Class: Insecta
- Order: Lepidoptera
- Family: Geometridae
- Genus: Rhodophthitus
- Species: R. tricoloraria

Binomial name
- Rhodophthitus tricoloraria (Mabille, 1890)

Synonyms
- Rhodophthitus imperialis Bastelberger, 1907

Species of moth

Rhodophthitus tricoloraria is a moth of the family Geometridae. It is found in the Democratic Republic of the Congo, Malawi, Namibia, Rwanda, Tanzania and Uganda.

The forewings of this species are yellowish white with black, parallel dashed lines. Hindwings are light-ochreous yellow with black central cell spot. The female has a wingspan of 54 mm.
