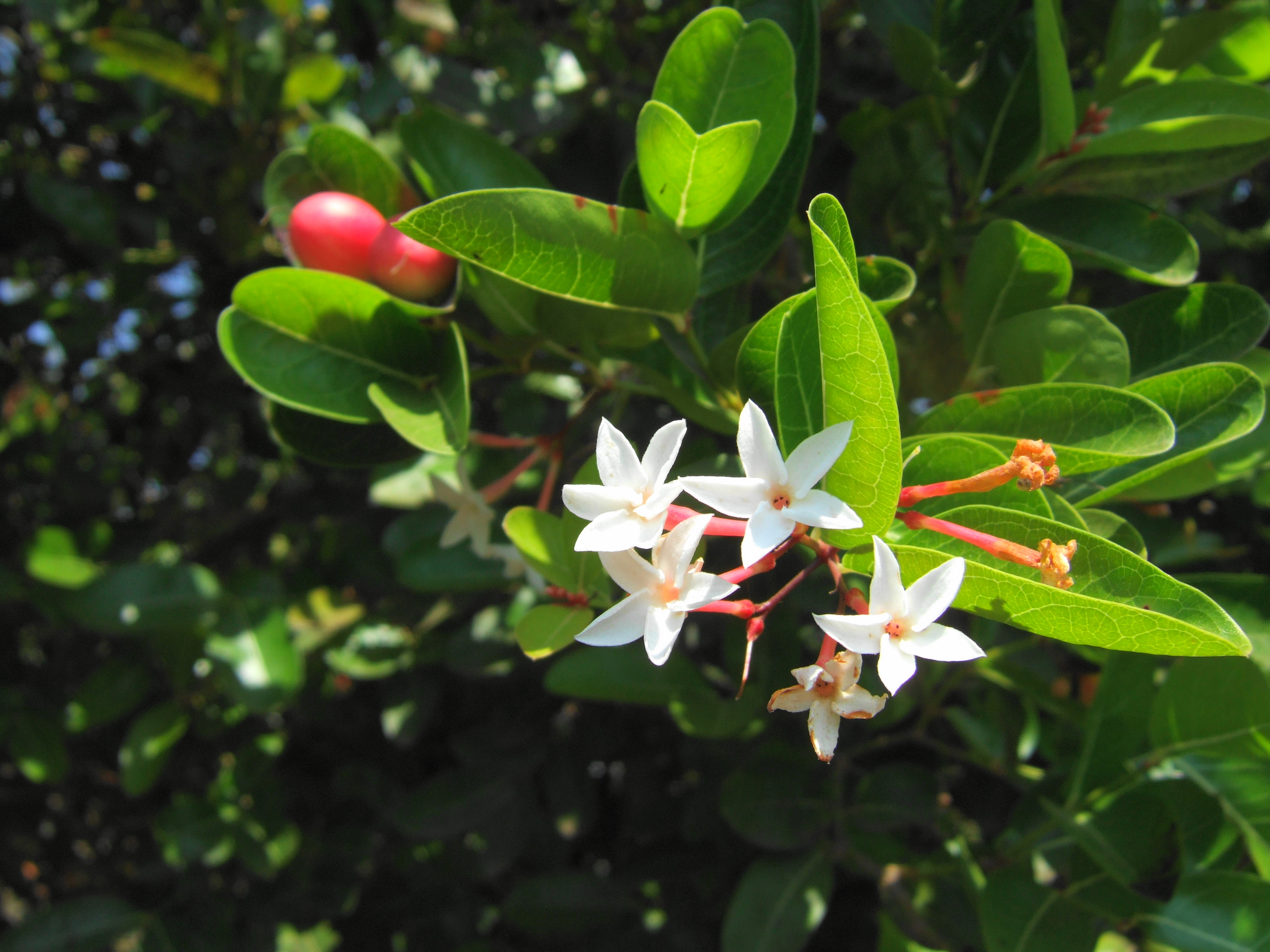

Scientific classification
- Kingdom: Plantae
- Clade: Tracheophytes
- Clade: Angiosperms
- Clade: Eudicots
- Clade: Asterids
- Order: Gentianales
- Family: Apocynaceae
- Genus: Carissa
- Species: C. carandas

Binomial name
- Carissa carandas L.

Synonyms
- Arduina carandas (L.) Baill.; Capparis carandas (L.) Burm.f.; Carissa salicina Lam.; Echites spinosus Burm.f.; Jasminonerium carandas (L.) Kuntze; Jasminonerium salicinum (Lam.) Kuntze

= Carissa carandas =

Species of flowering plant

Carissa carandas is a species of flowering shrub in the family Apocynaceae. It produces berry-sized fruits that are commonly used as a condiment in Indian pickles and spices. The fruit is black and tastes sweet or sour depending on the plant. It is a hardy, drought-tolerant plant that thrives well in a wide range of soils. Common names in English include Bengal currant, Carandas plum and karanda.

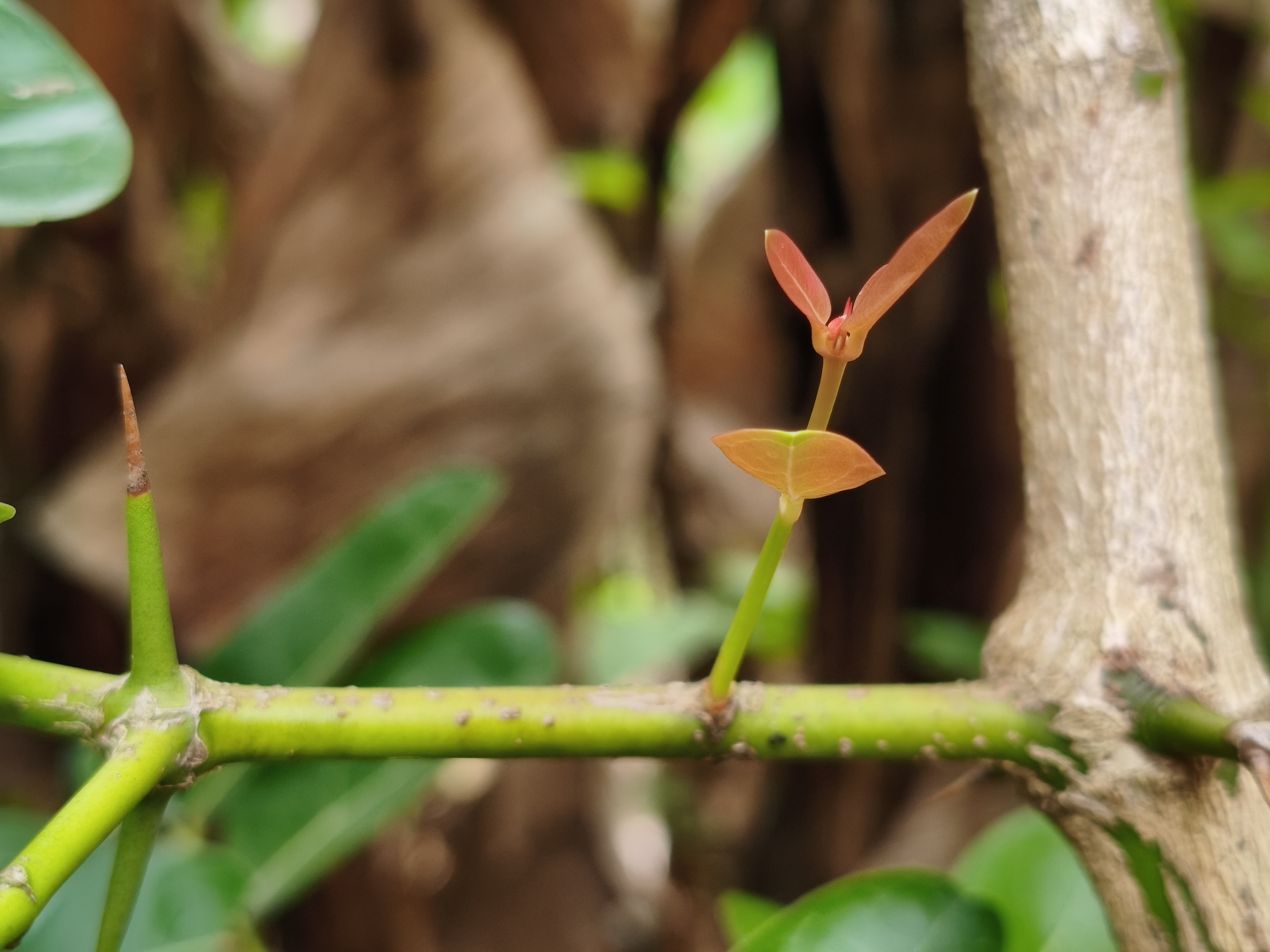
Thorn and fresh shoot on Bengal Currant

The supposed varieties congesta and paucinervia refer to the related conkerberry (C. spinarum).

== Distribution ==
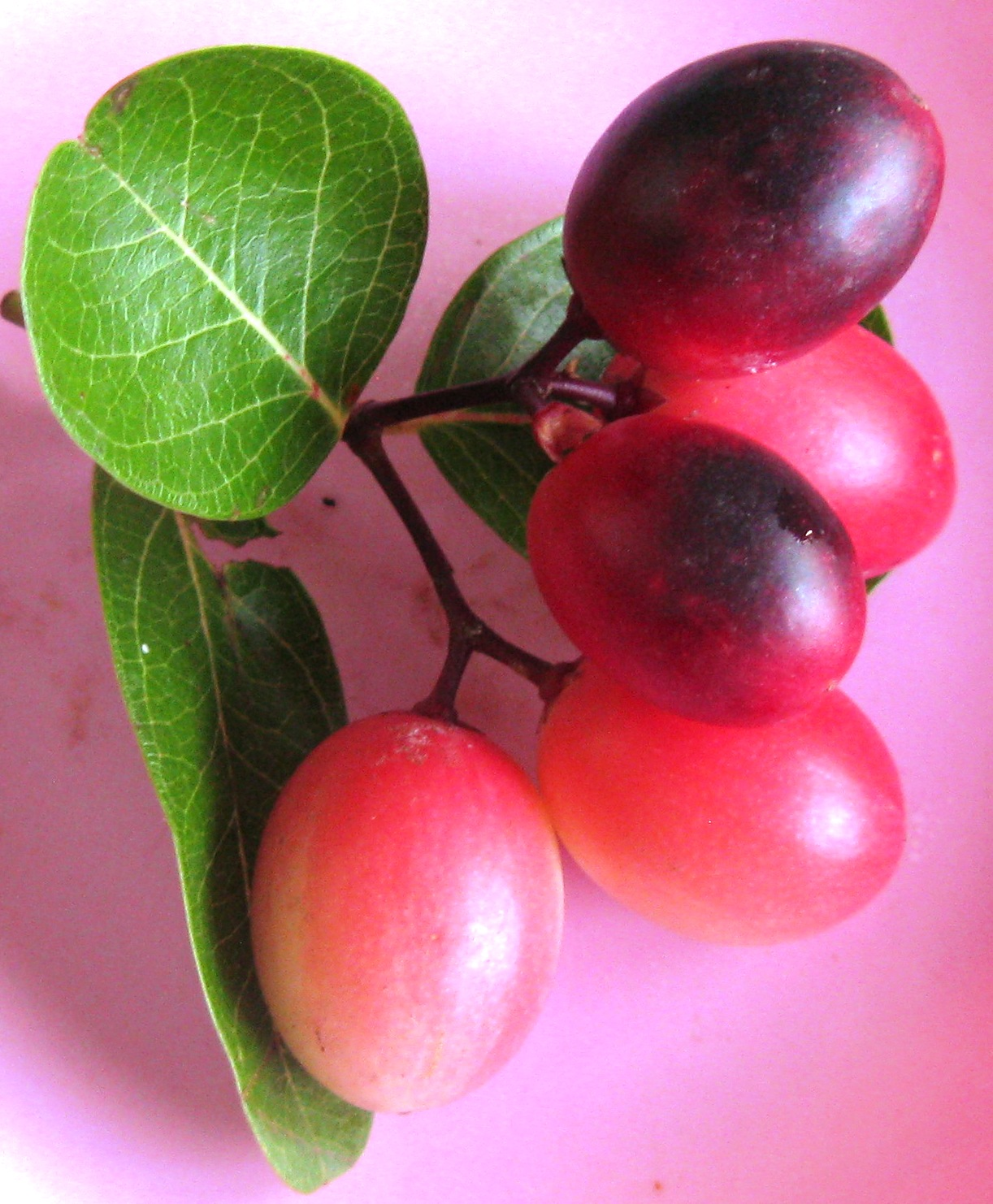
Fruit

The plant flourishes in regions with high temperatures, and it is abundant in the Western Ghats of the Konkan region in India, particularly in the states of Maharashtra, Goa, Karnataka and also in some regions of Andhra Pradesh. It is also grown in the temperate conditions of the Himalayan Siwalik Hills of India and Nepal at elevations of 30 to 1,800 metres (98 to 5,906 ft). In other parts of India, it is grown on a limited scale in Rajasthan, Odisha, Gujarat, Bihar, West Bengal and Uttar Pradesh. It is also found in other South Asian countries like in the lowland rain forests of Sri Lanka, and in Pakistan, Nepal, Afghanistan, and Bangladesh. It is an introduced species in the Americas and other parts of Asia.

== Propagation ==
The plant is grown from seed sown in August and September. The first monsoon shower is planting time. Plants raised from seed start bearing two years after planting. Vegetative propagation is practiced in the form of budding and inarching. Cuttings may also succeed. Flowering starts in March and in Northern India the fruit ripens from July to September.

== Chemistry ==
Isolation of many terpenoids has been reported. In particular mixture of sesquiterpenes namely carissone and carindone as a novel type of C31 terpenoid have been reported. Another ingredient is pentacyclic triterpenoid carissin.

== Uses ==
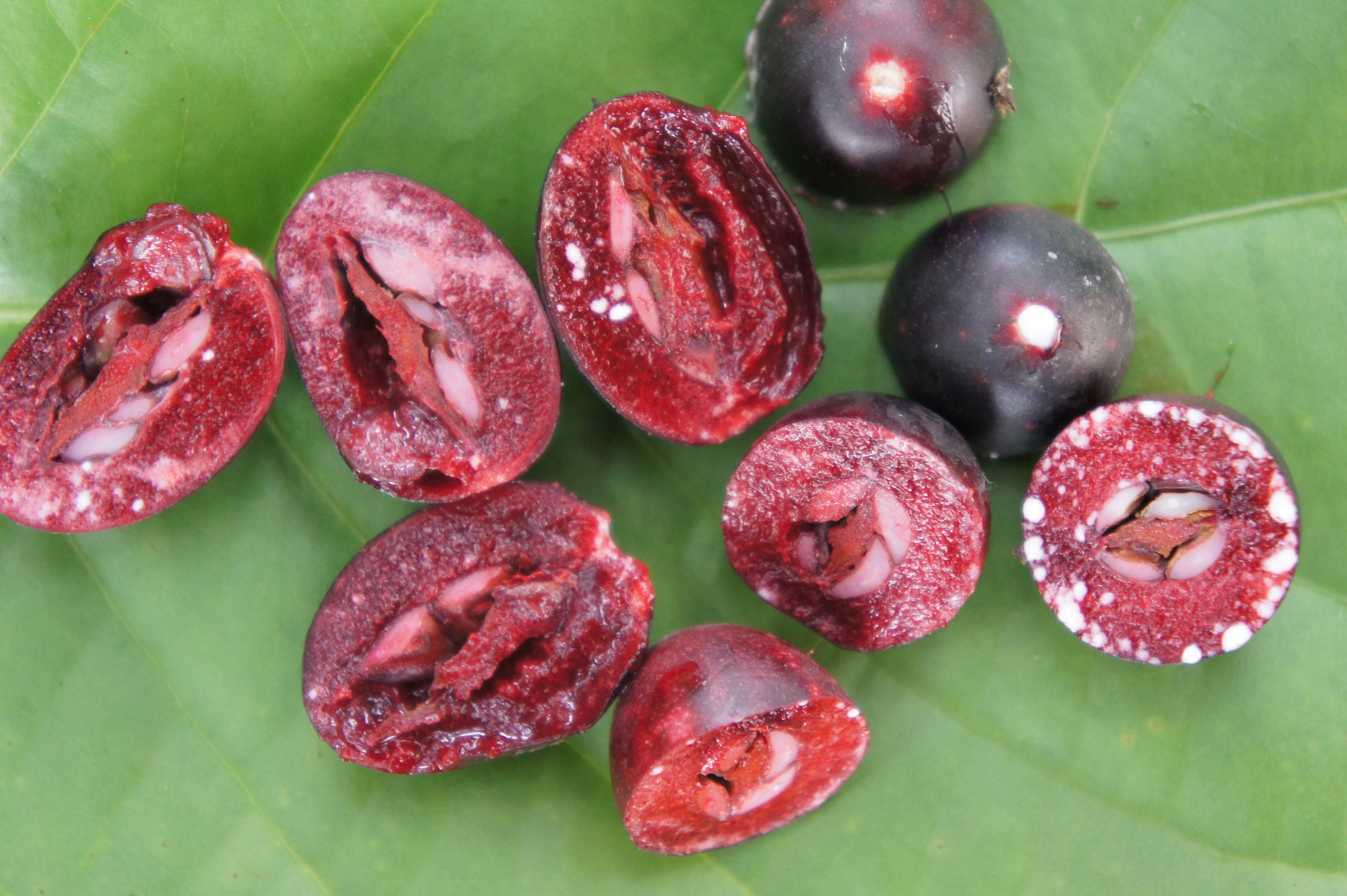
Fruit ready for consumption

=== Medicine and food ===
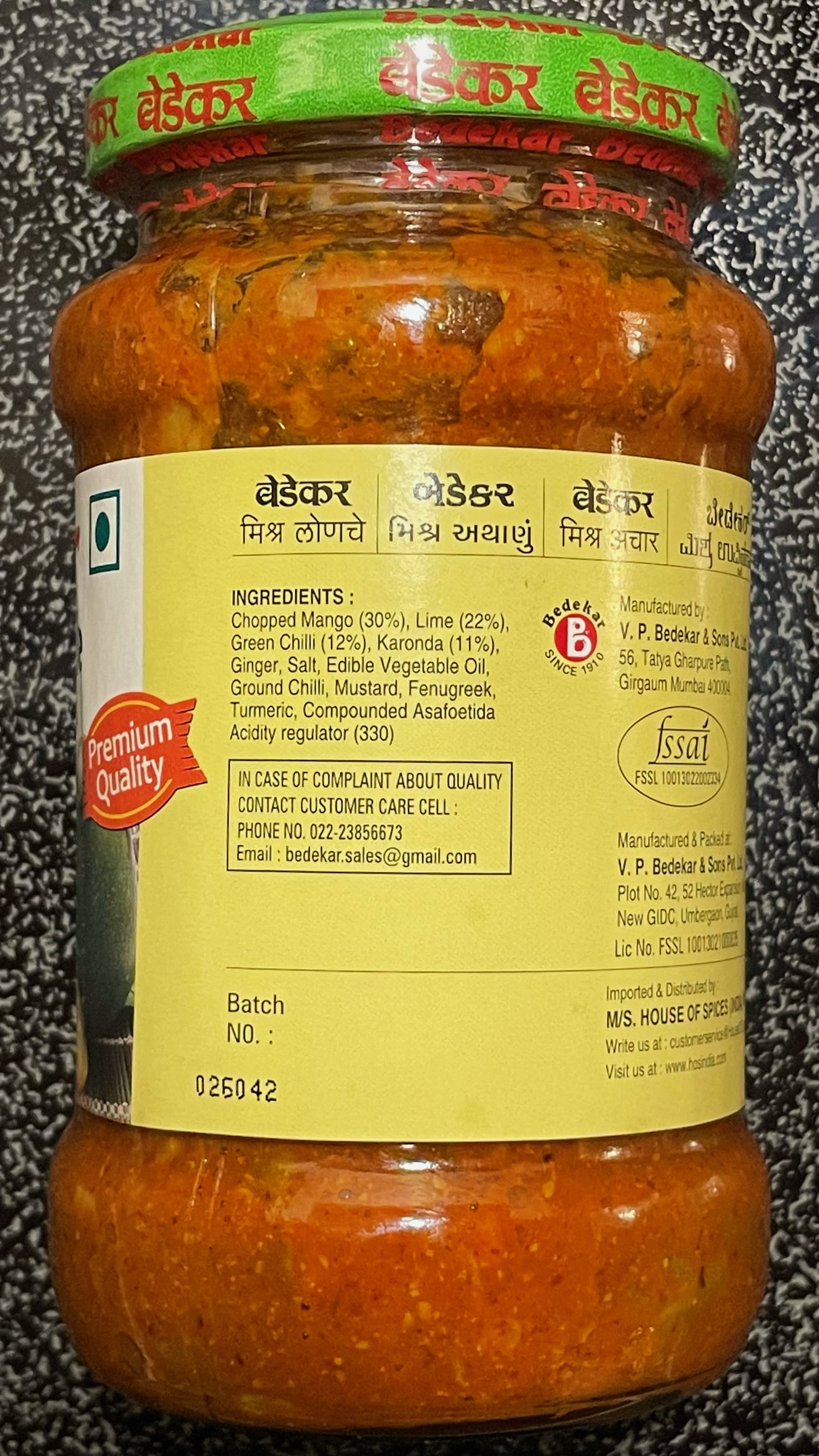
Karonda (11%) in mixed pickle

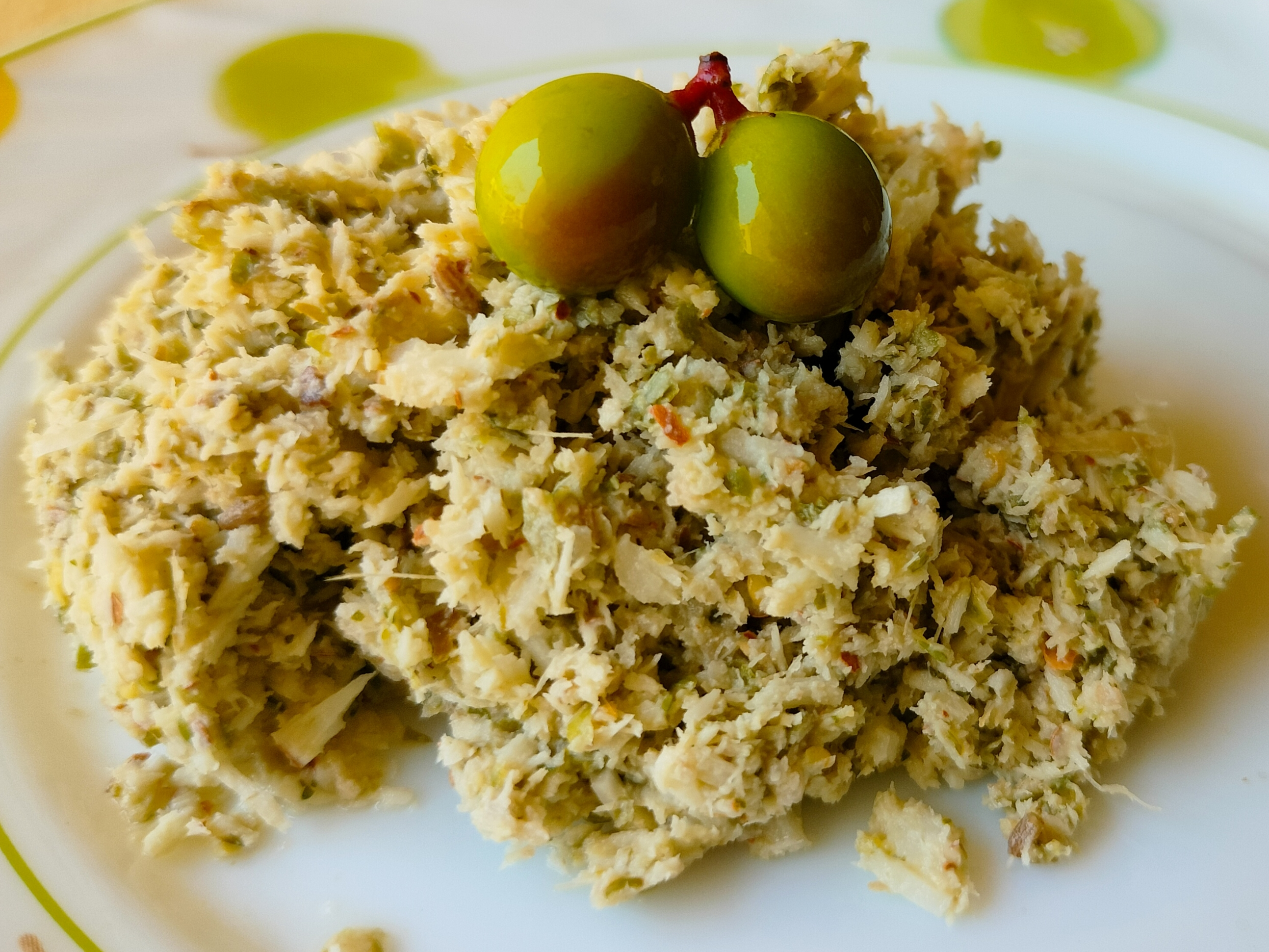
Karonda Chutney

Carissa carandas is rich in iron, vitamin C, vitamins A, calcium and phosphorus. Its fruit is used in the ancient Indian herbal system of medicine, Ayurvedic, to treat acidity, indigestion, fresh and infected wounds, skin diseases, urinary disorders and diabetic ulcers, as well as biliousness, stomach pain, constipation, anemia, skin conditions, anorexia and insanity. Leaf decoction is used to treat fever, diarrhea, and earache. The roots serve as a stomachic, an anthelmintic medicine for itches and also as insect repellents.

In India, the mature fruit is harvested for Indian pickles, వాక్కాయ పచ్చడి. It contains pectin and accordingly is a useful ingredient in chutney. Ripe fruits exude a white latex when severed from the branch.

The biggest use of this fruit is as a faux cherry in cakes, puddings and other preparations. It is easily available in the market in bottled form as pitted cherries after processing it like traditional candied murabba.

Colonial British in India also made jelly, jams and syrups from it.

=== Other uses ===
It was used in the Great Hedge of India (1803-1879 CE) because it is easy to grow, drought resistant, is a sturdy shrub that grows in a variety of soils, and also ideal for hedges as it grows rapidly, densely and needs little attention.
