= Rhodophthitus =

Scientific classification
- Kingdom: Animalia
- Phylum: Arthropoda
- Clade: Pancrustacea
- Class: Insecta
- Order: Lepidoptera
- Family: Geometridae
- Subfamily: Ennominae
- Genus: Rhodophthitus; Butler, 1880

Type species
- Rhodophthitus formosus Butler, 1880

Synonyms
- Hameopis Butler, 1898; Nothabraxas Warren, 1897; Rhodopan Oberthür, 1916

Genus of moths

Rhodophthitus is a genus of moths in the family Geometridae described by Arthur Gardiner Butler in 1880.

== Species ==
Some species of this genus are:

- Rhodophthitus anamesa (Prout, 1915)
- Rhodophthitus arichanaria D. S. Fletcher, 1978
- Rhodophthitus atacta Prout, 1922
- Rhodophthitus atricoloraria (Mabille, 1890)
- Rhodophthitus barlowi (Prout, 1922)
- Rhodophthitus betsileanus Herbulot, 1965
- Rhodophthitus castus Warren, 1904
- Rhodophthitus commaculata (Warren, 1897)
- Rhodophthitus formosus Butler, 1880
- Rhodophthitus myriostictus Prout, 1915
- Rhodophthitus procellosa Warren, 1905
- Rhodophthitus pseudabraxas Carcasson, 1964
- Rhodophthitus roseovittata (Butler, 1895)
- Rhodophthitus rudicornis (Butler, 1898)
- Rhodophthitus simplex Warren, 1897
- Rhodophthitus thapsinus Prout, 1931
- Rhodophthitus tricoloraria (Mabille, 1890)
- Rhodophthitus unca (Le Cerf, 1922)
