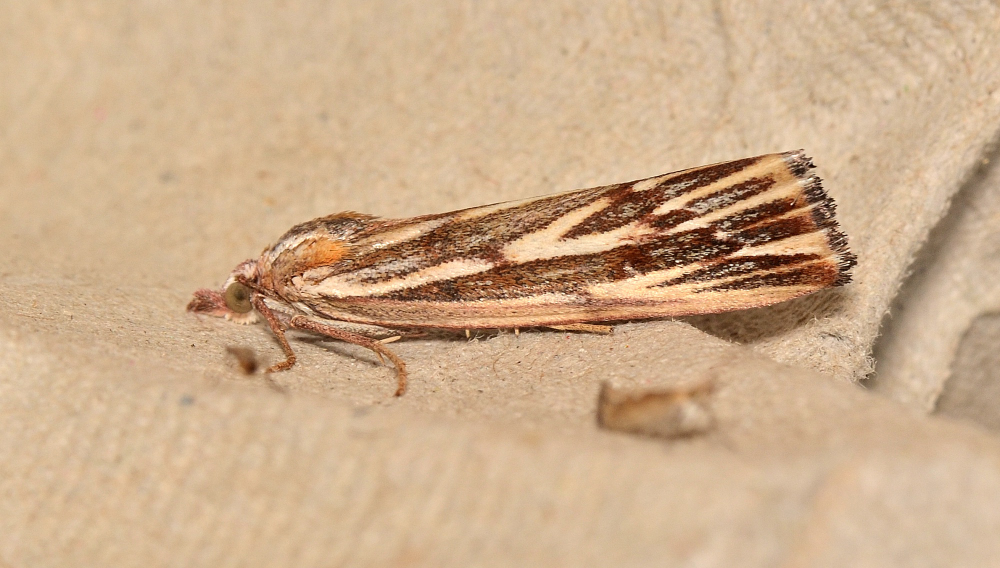
- Rhynchopsota delogramma

Scientific classification
- Kingdom: Animalia
- Phylum: Arthropoda
- Class: Insecta
- Order: Lepidoptera
- Family: Geometridae
- Genus: Rhynchopsota; Lower, 1903

= Rhynchopsota =

Genus of moths

Rhynchopsota is a genus of moths in the family Geometridae.
