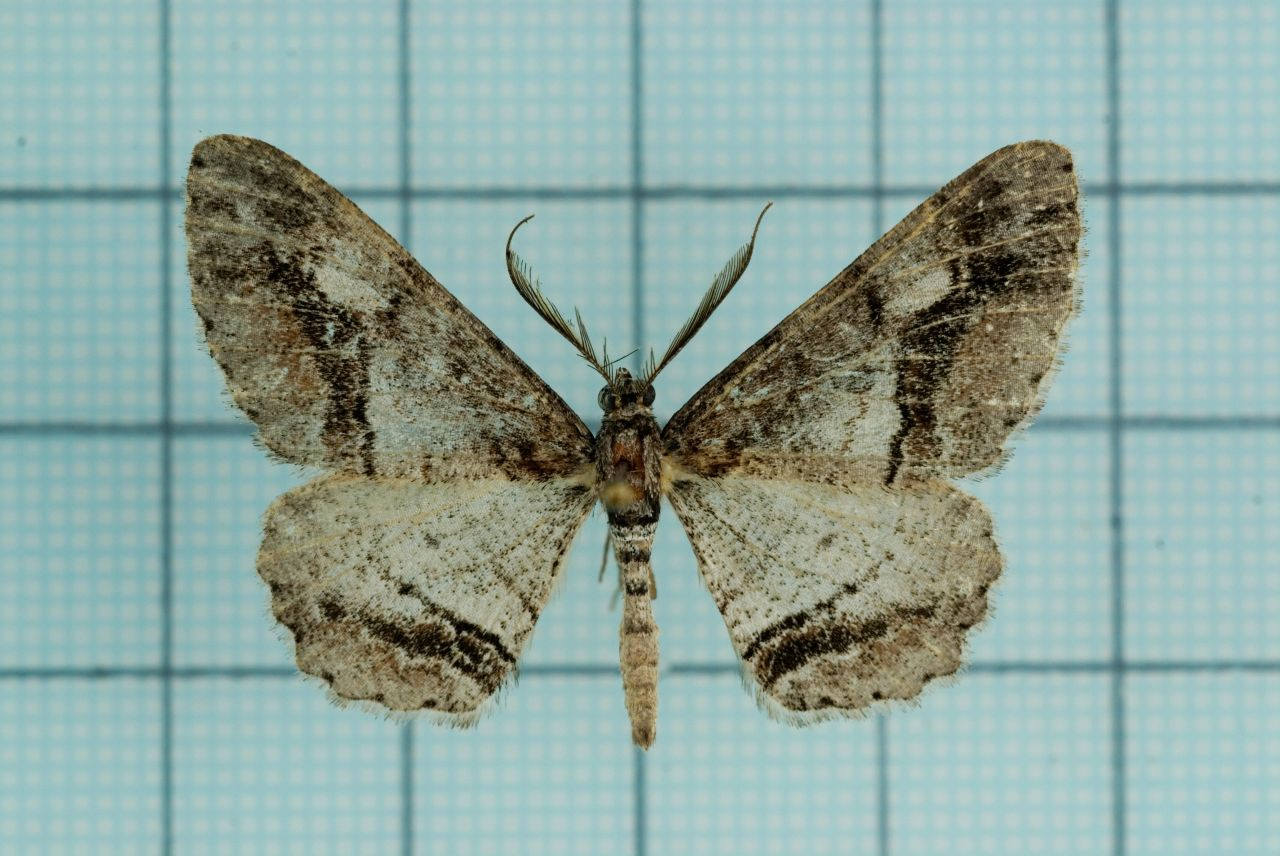
- Rikiosatoa fucataria

Scientific classification
- Kingdom: Animalia
- Phylum: Arthropoda
- Class: Insecta
- Order: Lepidoptera
- Family: Geometridae
- Tribe: Boarmiini
- Genus: Rikiosatoa; Inoue, 1982

= Rikiosatoa =

Genus of moths

Rikiosatoa is a genus of moths in the family Geometridae described by Inoue in 1982.

== Species ==
- Rikiosatoa bhutanica Inoue, 1992
- Rikiosatoa euphiles (Prout, 1916)
- Rikiosatoa fucataria (Wileman, 1911)
- Rikiosatoa fucatariodes Sato, 1992
- Rikiosatoa grisea (Butler, 1878)
- Rikiosatoa hoenensis (Wehrli, 1943)
- Rikiosatoa mavi (Prout, 1915)
- Rikiosatoa transversa Inoue, 1998
- Rikiosatoa vandervoordeni (Prout, 1923)
