= Rhodesia (moth) =

Scientific classification
- Kingdom: Animalia
- Phylum: Arthropoda
- Class: Insecta
- Order: Lepidoptera
- Family: Geometridae
- Subfamily: Geometrinae
- Genus: Rhodesia; Warren, 1905

Type species
- Rhodesia viridalbata Warren, 1905

Genus of moths

Rhodesia is a genus of moths in the family Geometridae described by William Warren in 1905.

== Species ==
Species in this genus are:

- Rhodesia alboviridata (Saalmüller, 1880)
- Rhodesia depompata Prout, 1913
- Rhodesia viridalbata Warren, 1905
