= Chapelieria =

Conservation status
- Least Concern (IUCN 3.1)

Scientific classification
- Kingdom: Plantae
- Clade: Tracheophytes
- Clade: Angiosperms
- Clade: Eudicots
- Clade: Asterids
- Order: Gentianales
- Family: Rubiaceae
- Genus: Chapelieria; A.Rich. ex DC.
- Species: C. madagascariensis

Binomial name
- Chapelieria madagascariensis A.Rich. ex DC.

Synonyms
- Genus: Tamatavia Hook.f.; Species: Chapelieria melleri (Hook.f.) K.Schum.; Tamatavia melleri Hook.f.

Genus of plants

Chapelieria is a monotypic genus of flowering plants in the family Rubiaceae. The genus contains only one species, viz. Chapelieria madagascariensis, which is endemic to Madagascar.

== Description ==
Chapelieria madagascariensis is a shrub growing 1.5 to 3 meters high, or a small tree growing from 5 to 8 meters high.

== Range and habitat ==
Chapelieria madagascariensis is native to Madagascar's eastern coast in Antsiranana, Toamasina, and Fianarantsoa provinces. Its estimated extent of occurrence (EOO) is 23,707 km^{2}, and estimated and the area of occupancy (AOO) is 132 km^{2}. The AOO may be under-estimated due to under-sampling.

It is native to coastal (littoral, sub- or supra-littoral) humid evergreen forest between sea level and 50 meters elevation, where it is found in primary, degraded, and very degraded forests on white or brown sands or clay-sand.
