= Rucana =

Scientific classification
- Kingdom: Animalia
- Phylum: Arthropoda
- Class: Insecta
- Order: Lepidoptera
- Family: Geometridae
- Genus: Rucana; Rindge, 1983

Genus of moths

Rucana is a genus of moths in the family Geometridae.
