= Rhinoprora =

Scientific classification
- Domain: Eukaryota
- Kingdom: Animalia
- Phylum: Arthropoda
- Class: Insecta
- Order: Lepidoptera
- Family: Geometridae
- Tribe: Eupitheciini
- Genus: Rhinoprora; Warren, 1895

Genus of moths

Rhinoprora is a genus of moths in the family Geometridae first described by Warren in 1895. The Global Lepidoptera Names Index lists this genus as a junior subjective synonym of Pasiphila Meyrick, 1883.

== Species ==
- Rhinoprora oribates
- Rhinoprora palpata
