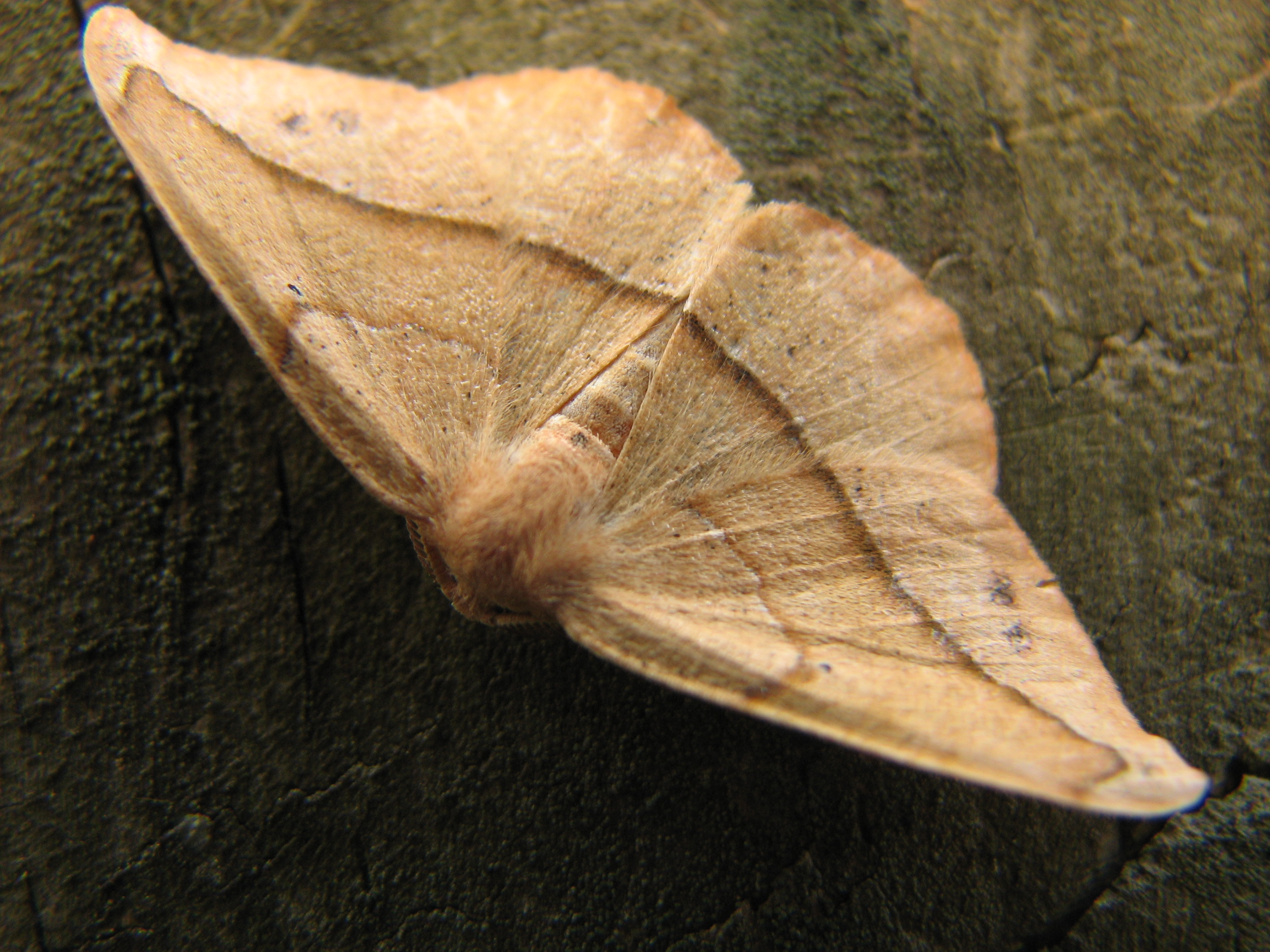
- Patalene olyzonaria

Scientific classification
- Kingdom: Animalia
- Phylum: Arthropoda
- Class: Insecta
- Order: Lepidoptera
- Family: Geometridae
- Genus: Patalene
- Species: P. olyzonaria

Binomial name
- Patalene olyzonaria (Walker, 1860)

Synonyms
- Syssaura olyzonaria Walker, 1860; Drepanodes syzygiaria Hulst, 1886; Drepanodes sesquilinea Grote, 1870; Patalene olyzonaria puber (Grote & Robinson, 1867); Patalene varus (Grote & Robinson, 1867); Patalene aquosus (Grote & Robinson, 1867); Patalene juniperaria (Packard, 1871); Patalene hortularia (Hulst, 1886); Patalene perizomaria (Hulst, 1886)

= Patalene olyzonaria =

Species of moth

Patalene olyzonaria, the juniper-twig geometer, is a moth of the family Geometridae. It is found from Quebec and New Hampshire to Florida, west to Texas, north to Wisconsin.

The wingspan is 21–25 mm. Adults are on wing from April to November. There are two to three generations per year.

The larvae feed on Juniperus species and at times Thuja occidentalis and possibly Pinus.
