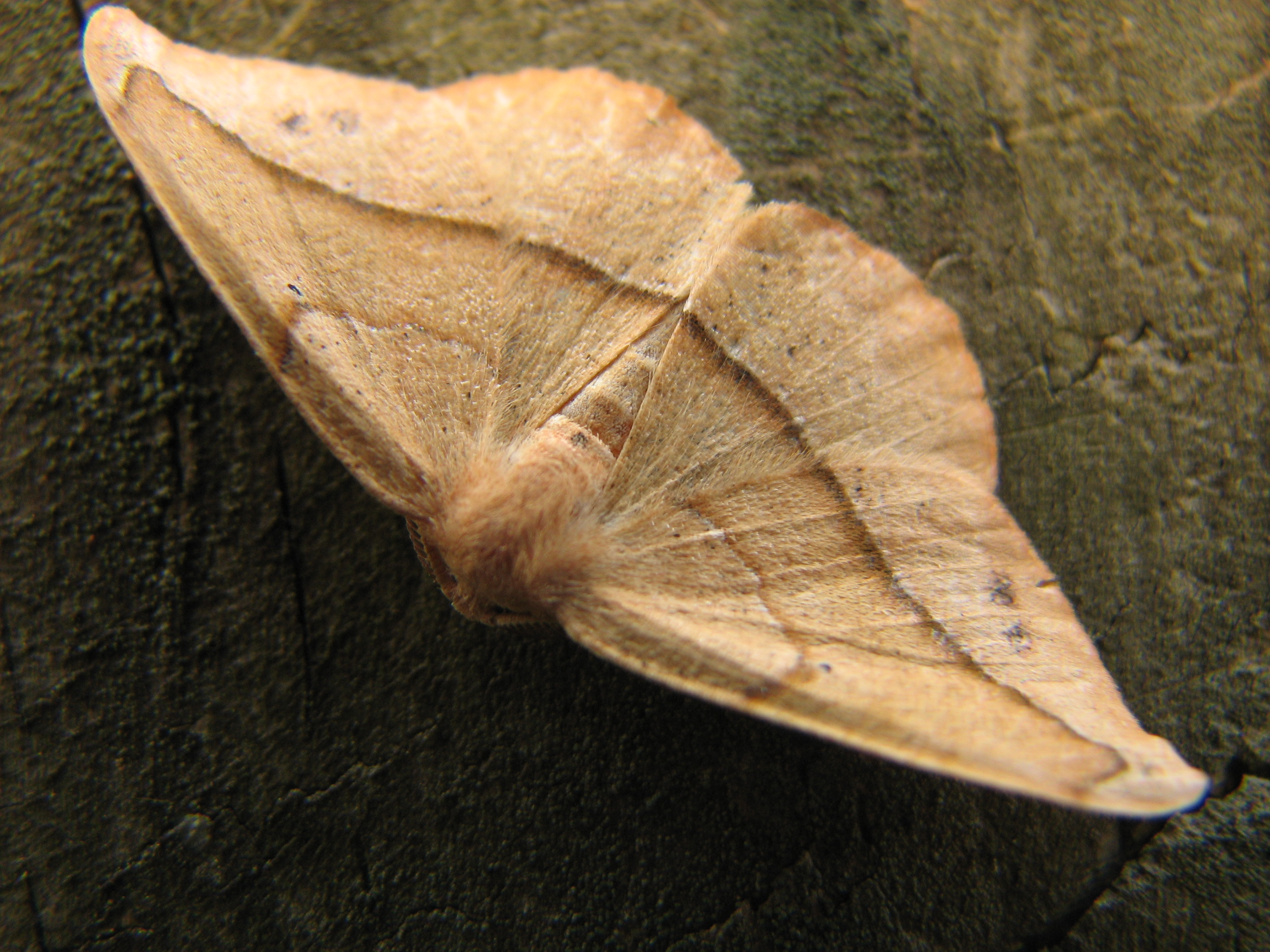
- Patalene olyzonaria

Scientific classification
- Domain: Eukaryota
- Kingdom: Animalia
- Phylum: Arthropoda
- Class: Insecta
- Order: Lepidoptera
- Family: Geometridae
- Tribe: Ourapterygini
- Genus: Patalene; Herrich-Schäffer, [1854]

= Patalene (moth) =

Genus of moths

Patalene is a genus of moths in the family Geometridae erected by Gottlieb August Wilhelm Herrich-Schäffer in 1854.

== Species ==
- Patalene asychisaria (Walker, 1860)
- Patalene chaonia (Druce, 1887)
- Patalene dissimilis (Schaus, 1901)
- Patalene ephyrata (Guenée, [1858])
- Patalene epionata Guenée, 1857)
- Patalene falcularia Herrich-Schäffer, [1854]
- Patalene luciata (Stoll, [1790])
- Patalene olyzonaria (Walker, 1860)
- Patalene nicoaria (Walker, 1860)
- Patalene quatuormaculata (Verloren, 1837)
- Patalene trogonaria (Herrich-Schäffer, [1856])
- Patalene virgultaria (Felder & Rogenhofer, 1875)
