= List of geometrid genera: S =

The very large moth family Geometridae contains genera beginning with A, B, C, D, E, F, G, H, I, J, K, L, M, N, O, P, Q, R, S, T, U, V, W, X, Y and Z.

Those beginning with S include:

- Sabaria
- Sabulodes
- Sacrognophos
- Salasaca
- Salpis
- Samana
- Sangala
- Sangalopsis
- Sarcinodes
- Sardocyrnia
- Sarisa
- Sarobeia
- Sarracena
- Sathrosia
- Satoblephara
- Satoracotis
- Satraparchis
- Sauris
- Scardamia
- Scardostrenia
- Sceleuthrix
- Scelidacantha
- Scelolophia
- Schematorhages
- Schistocolpia
- Schistophyle
- Schistostege
- Sciadia
- Sciagraphia
- Scinneria
- Scintillithex
- Scioglyptis
- Scionomia
- Scodiomima
- Scodionista
- Scopula
- Scopuloides
- Scordylia
- Scordyliodes
- Scoriopsis
- Scotocoremia
- Scotocyma
- Scotopteryx
- Scotorythra
- Sebastosema
- Segalenara
- Selenia
- Seleniopsis
- Selidosema
- Semaeopus
- Semiaspilates
- Semiothisa
- Sericanaphe
- Sericoptera
- Sericosema
- Serraca
- Serratophyga
- Sesquialtera
- Sesquiptera
- Sestra
- Shangrilana
- Sibatania
- Sicya
- Sicyodes
- Sicyopsis
- Sigmathyris
- Silabraxas
- Sillophora
- Silvaspica
- Simena
- Simopteryx
- Simotricha
- Sinameda
- Singidava
- Sinope
- Siona
- Siopla
- Siosta
- Sirinopteryx
- Sisyrophyta
- Skorpisthes
- Slossonia
- Smicropus
- Smileuma
- Smyriodes
- Snowia
- Solitanea
- Solomonophila
- Somatina
- Somatinopsis
- Somatolophia
- Songarica
- Spaniocentra
- Spargania
- Sparta
- Spartopteryx
- Spectrobasis
- Speluncaris
- Speranza
- Spermo
- Sperrya
- Sphacelodes
- Sphagnodela
- Sphingomima
- Spilocraspeda
- Spiloctenia
- Spilopera
- Spinuncus
- Spiralisigna
- Spododes
- Spodolepis
- Stalagmia
- Stamnoctenis
- Stamnodes
- Stathmonyma
- Stegania
- Steganolophia
- Steganomima
- Stegotheca
- Steirophora
- Stenalcidia
- Stenaspilates
- Stenaspilatodes
- Stenele
- Stenista
- Stenocharis
- Stenocharta
- Stenodonta
- Stenoleuca
- Stenopla
- Stenoporpia
- Stenoptilotis
- Stenorrhoe
- Stenorumia
- Stenoteras
- Stergamataea
- Sterictopsis
- Sterrha
- Sterrhochaeta
- Sthanelia
- Stibaractis
- Stibaroma
- Stibarostoma
- Stigma
- Stinoptila
- Stratocleis
- Streblopoda
- Strepsichlora
- Strepsizuga
- Streptopteron
- Strophoptila
- Stueningia
- Stygomorpha
- Subdischidesia
- Sucra
- Sundadoxa
- Sundagrapha
- Sundascelia
- Swannia
- Sybarites
- Syllexis
- Symmacra
- Symmetresia
- Symmetroctena
- Symmiges
- Symmimetis
- Symphylistis
- Synaxis
- Synchlora
- Syncirsodes
- Synclysmus
- Syncollesis
- Syncosmia
- Syncrenis
- Syndetodes
- Syndromodes
- Synecta
- Synegia
- Synegiodes
- Synelys
- Syneora
- Synglochis
- Syngonorthus
- Synneuria
- Synneurodes
- Synnomos
- Synomila
- Synopsia
- Synopsidia
- Synpelurga
- Syntaracta
- Synthalia
- Synzeuxis
- Syrrheuma
- Syrrhizodes
- Syrrhodia
- Syrtodes
- Sysstema
- Systatica
- Syzeuxis
- Syzyx
