= Stenoporpia polygrammaria =

Scientific classification
- Kingdom: Animalia
- Phylum: Arthropoda
- Clade: Pancrustacea
- Class: Insecta
- Order: Lepidoptera
- Family: Geometridae
- Tribe: Boarmiini
- Genus: Stenoporpia
- Species: S. polygrammaria

Binomial name
- Stenoporpia polygrammaria (Packard, 1876)

Species of moth

Stenoporpia polygrammaria, known generally as the faded gray or faded gray geometer, is a species of geometrid moth in the family Geometridae. It is found in North America.

The MONA or Hodges number for Stenoporpia polygrammaria is 6459.
