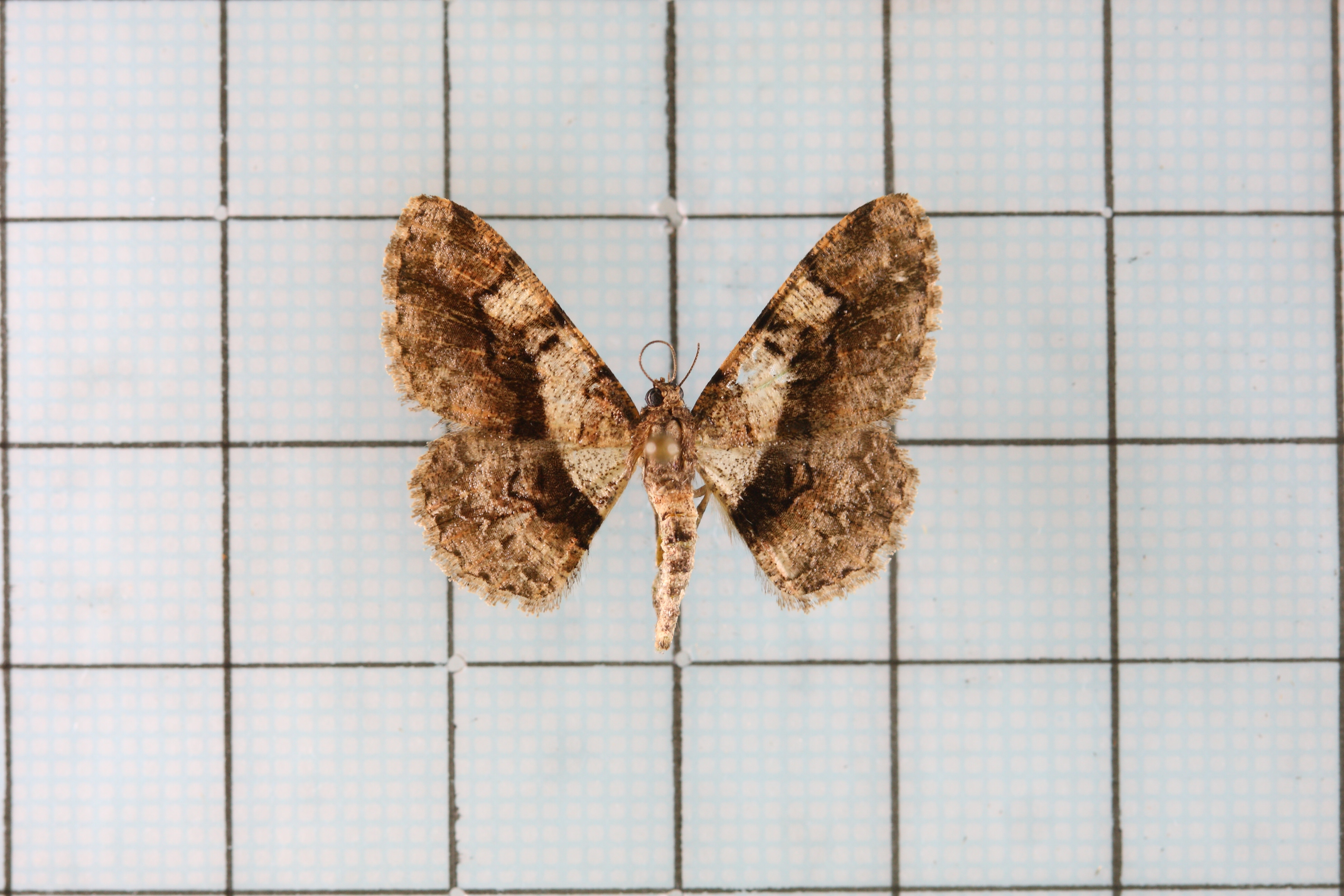

Scientific classification
- Kingdom: Animalia
- Phylum: Arthropoda
- Class: Insecta
- Order: Lepidoptera
- Family: Geometridae
- Genus: Satoblephara
- Species: S. owadai

Binomial name
- Satoblephara owadai (Inoue, 1978)

Synonyms
- Diplurodes owadai Inoue, 1978

= Satoblephara owadai =

Species of moth

Satoblephara owadai is a species of moth of the family Geometridae. It is found in Taiwan.

The wingspan is about 32 mm (1.3 in).

== Taxonomy ==
It was formerly treated as a subspecies of Satoblephara parvalaria.
