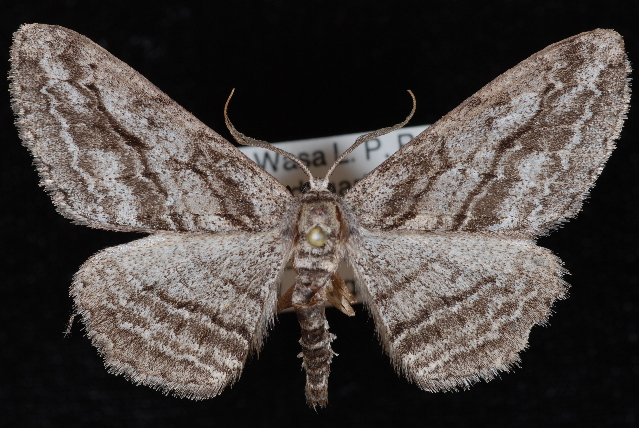

Scientific classification
- Domain: Eukaryota
- Kingdom: Animalia
- Phylum: Arthropoda
- Class: Insecta
- Order: Lepidoptera
- Family: Geometridae
- Genus: Stenoporpia
- Species: S. excelsaria

Binomial name
- Stenoporpia excelsaria (Strecker, 1899)

= Stenoporpia excelsaria =

Species of moth

Stenoporpia excelsaria is a species of geometrid moth in the family Geometridae. It is found in North America.

The MONA or Hodges number for Stenoporpia excelsaria is 6474.

== Subspecies ==
These two subspecies belong to the species Stenoporpia excelsaria:

- Stenoporpia excelsaria excelsaria
- Stenoporpia excelsaria pullata Rindge, 1968
