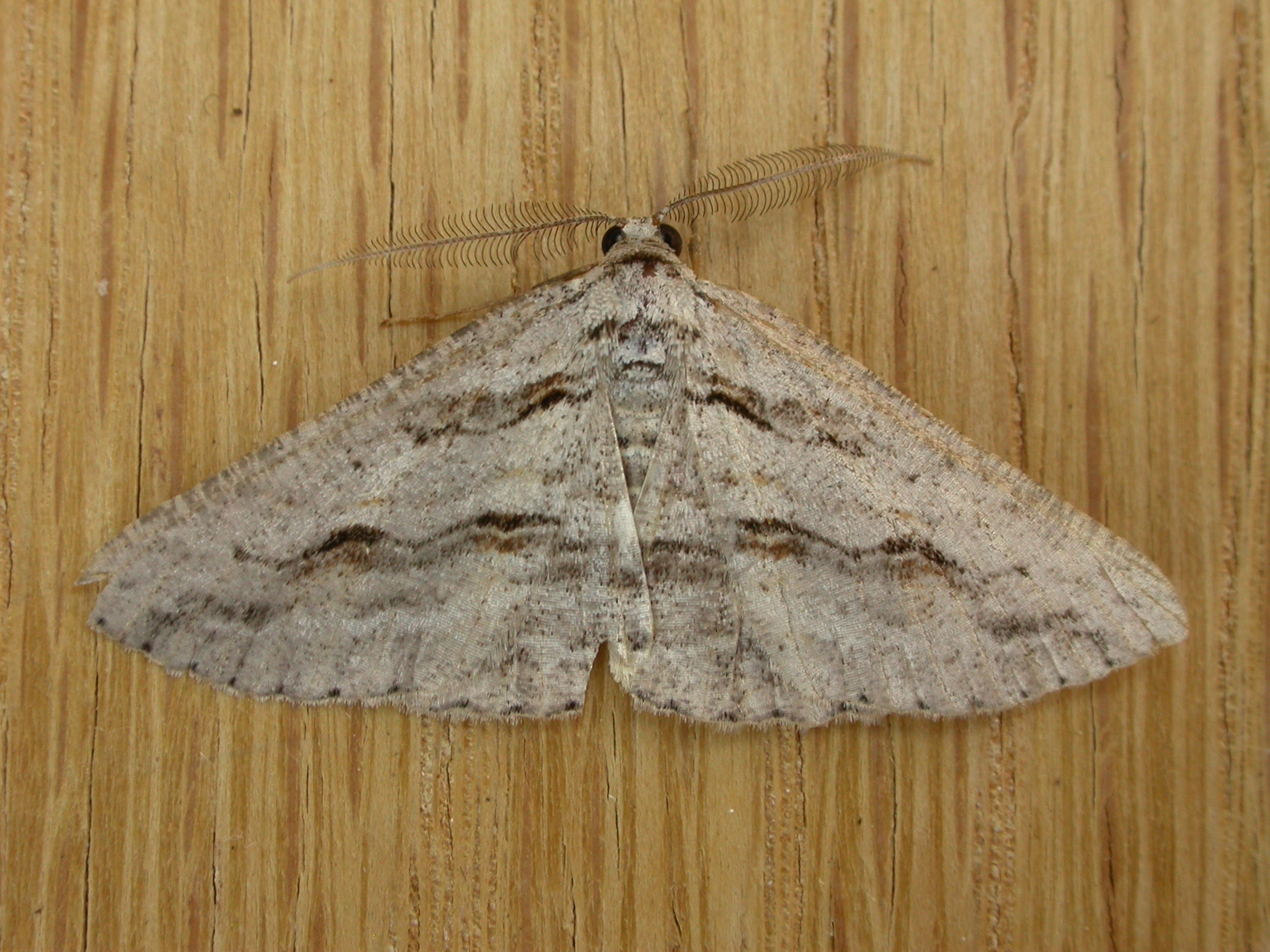

Scientific classification
- Kingdom: Animalia
- Phylum: Arthropoda
- Class: Insecta
- Order: Lepidoptera
- Family: Geometridae
- Genus: Syneora
- Species: S. mundifera

Binomial name
- Syneora mundifera Walker, 1860

Synonyms
- Boarmia tephroleuca

= Syneora mundifera =

Species of moth

Syneora mundifera, the forest bark moth, is a moth of the family Geometridae first described by Francis Walker in 1860. It is found in Australia.

The wingspan is about 40 mm.
