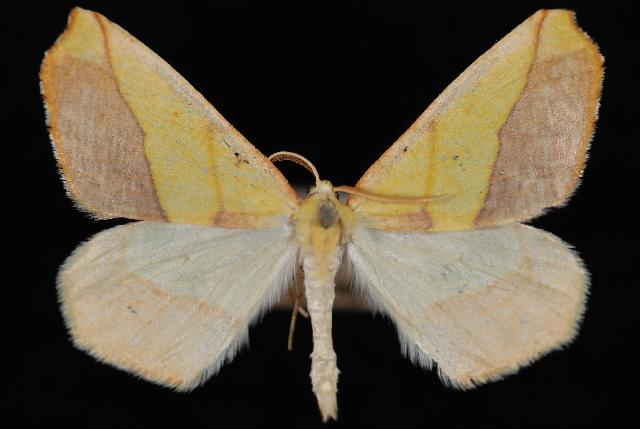

Scientific classification
- Domain: Eukaryota
- Kingdom: Animalia
- Phylum: Arthropoda
- Class: Insecta
- Order: Lepidoptera
- Family: Geometridae
- Tribe: Ourapterygini
- Genus: Sicya
- Species: S. macularia

Binomial name
- Sicya macularia (Harris in Agassiz & Cabot, 1850)

= Sicya macularia =

Species of moth

Sicya macularia, known generally as sharp-lined yellow, is a species of geometrid moth in the family Geometridae. Other common names include the pink-bordered yellow and two-pronged looper. It is found in North America.

The MONA or Hodges number for Sicya macularia is 6912.

== Subspecies ==
These three subspecies belong to the species Sicya macularia:

- Sicya macularia cruzensis Dyar
- Sicya macularia laetula Barnes & McDunnough
- Sicya macularia macularia
