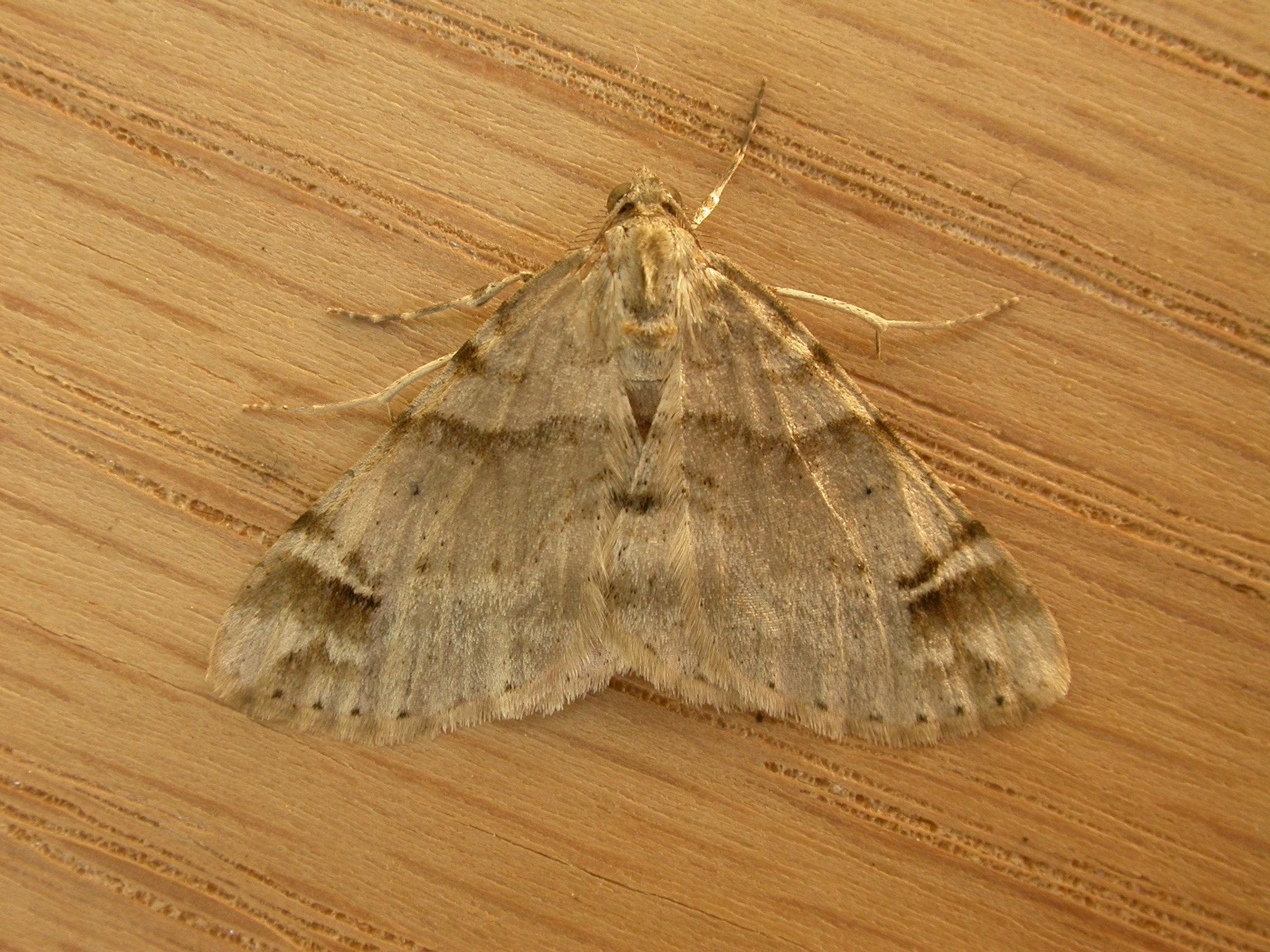

Scientific classification
- Kingdom: Animalia
- Phylum: Arthropoda
- Class: Insecta
- Order: Lepidoptera
- Family: Geometridae
- Genus: Syneora
- Species: S. hemeropa

Binomial name
- Syneora hemeropa Meyrick, 1892

= Syneora hemeropa =

Species of moth

Syneora hemeropa, the ring-tipped bark moth, is a moth of the family Geometridae first described by Edward Meyrick in 1892. It occurs in eastern Australia from Queensland down to Tasmania.

== Description ==
Adults of this species have a wingspan of approximately 3 cm. They are brown with dark markings on the wings.
