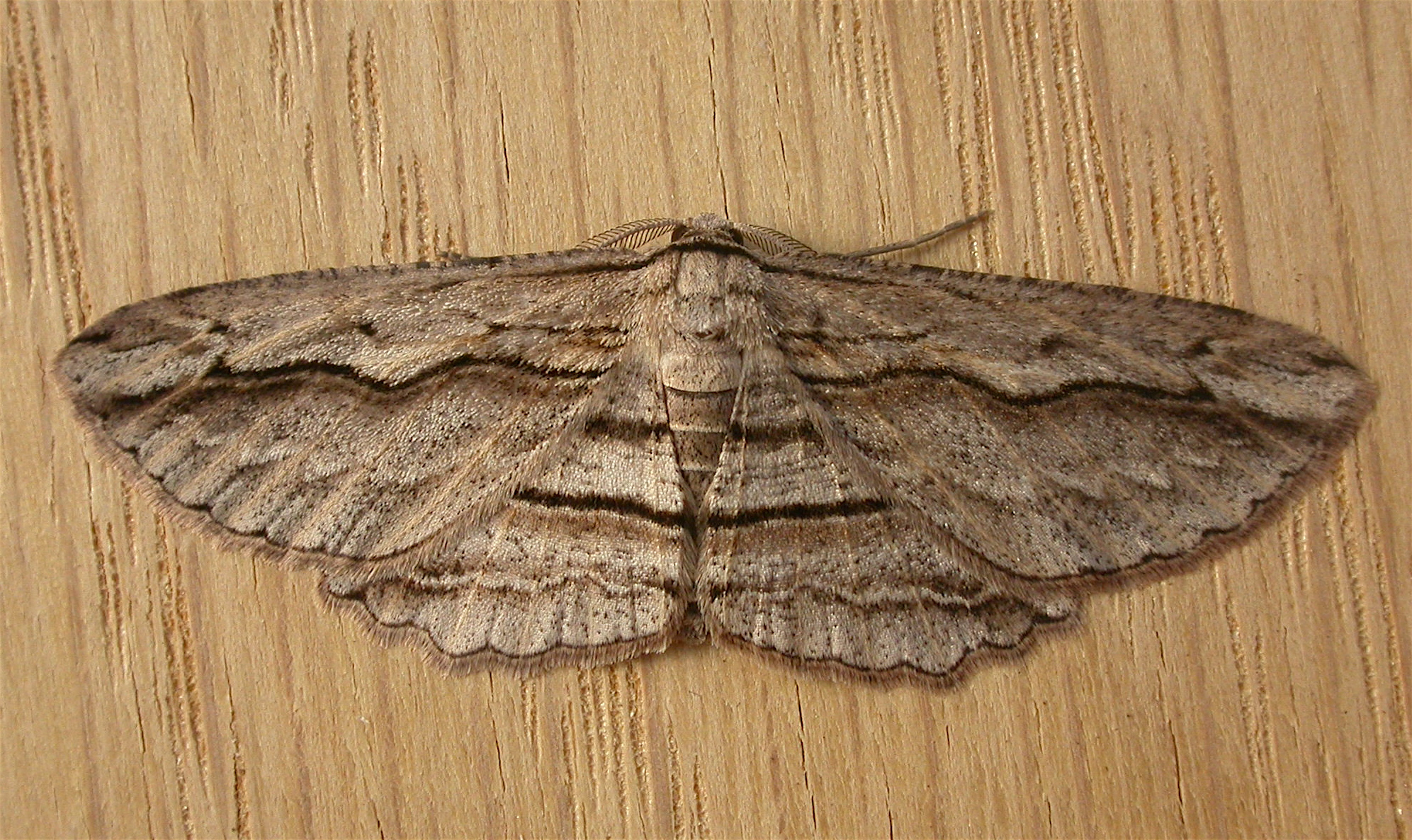

Scientific classification
- Domain: Eukaryota
- Kingdom: Animalia
- Phylum: Arthropoda
- Class: Insecta
- Order: Lepidoptera
- Family: Geometridae
- Genus: Scioglyptis
- Species: S. loxographa

Binomial name
- Scioglyptis loxographa Turner, 1917

= Scioglyptis loxographa =

Species of moth

Scioglyptis loxographa is a species of moth of the family Geometridae. It is found in Australia, including Tasmania.
