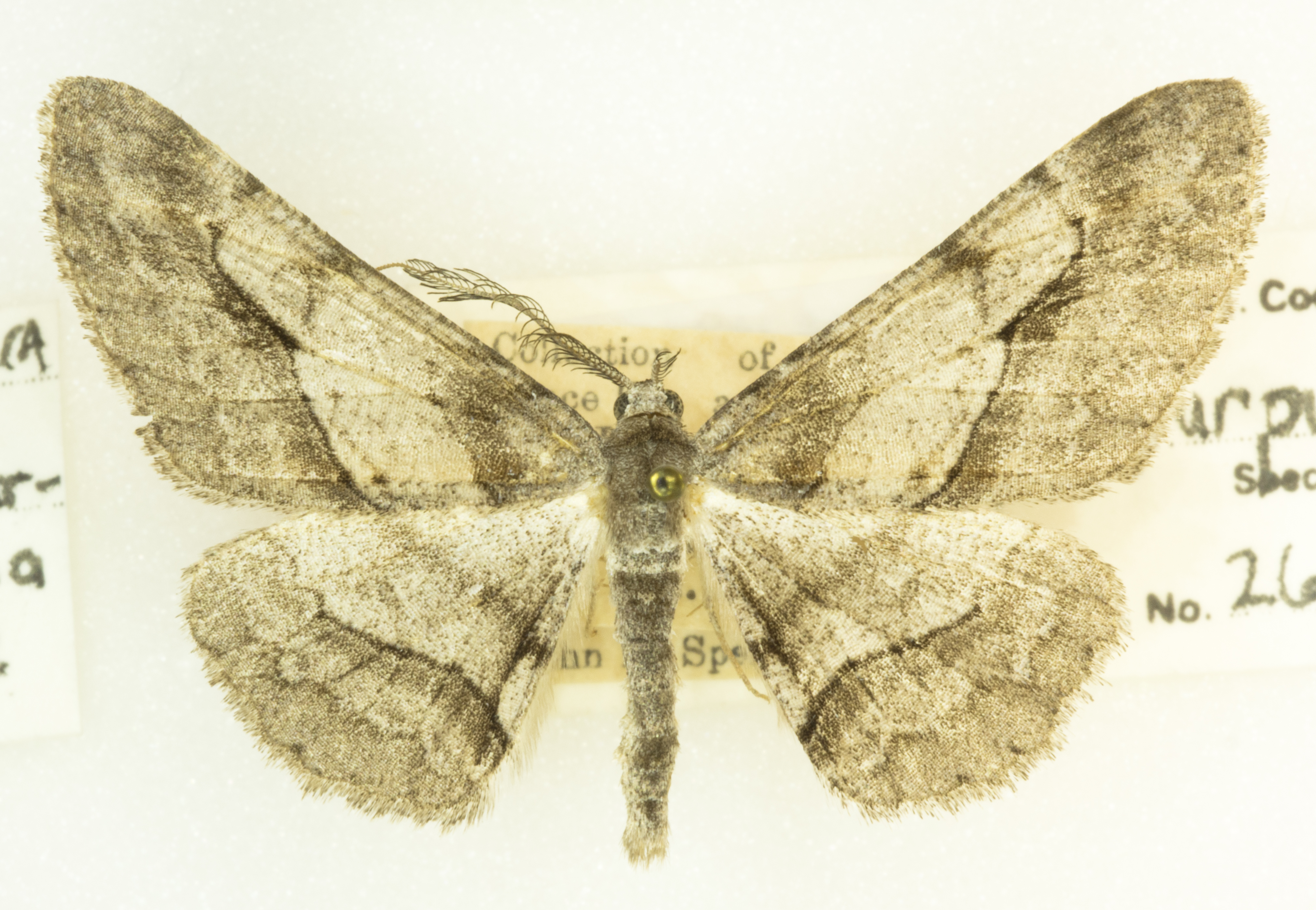

Scientific classification
- Domain: Eukaryota
- Kingdom: Animalia
- Phylum: Arthropoda
- Class: Insecta
- Order: Lepidoptera
- Family: Geometridae
- Genus: Stenoporpia
- Species: S. purpuraria

Binomial name
- Stenoporpia purpuraria (Barnes & McDunnough, 1913)

= Stenoporpia purpuraria =

Species of moth

Stenoporpia purpuraria is a species of moth in the family Geometridae first described by William Barnes and James Halliday McDunnough in 1913. It is found in North America.

The MONA or Hodges number for Stenoporpia purpuraria is 6464.
