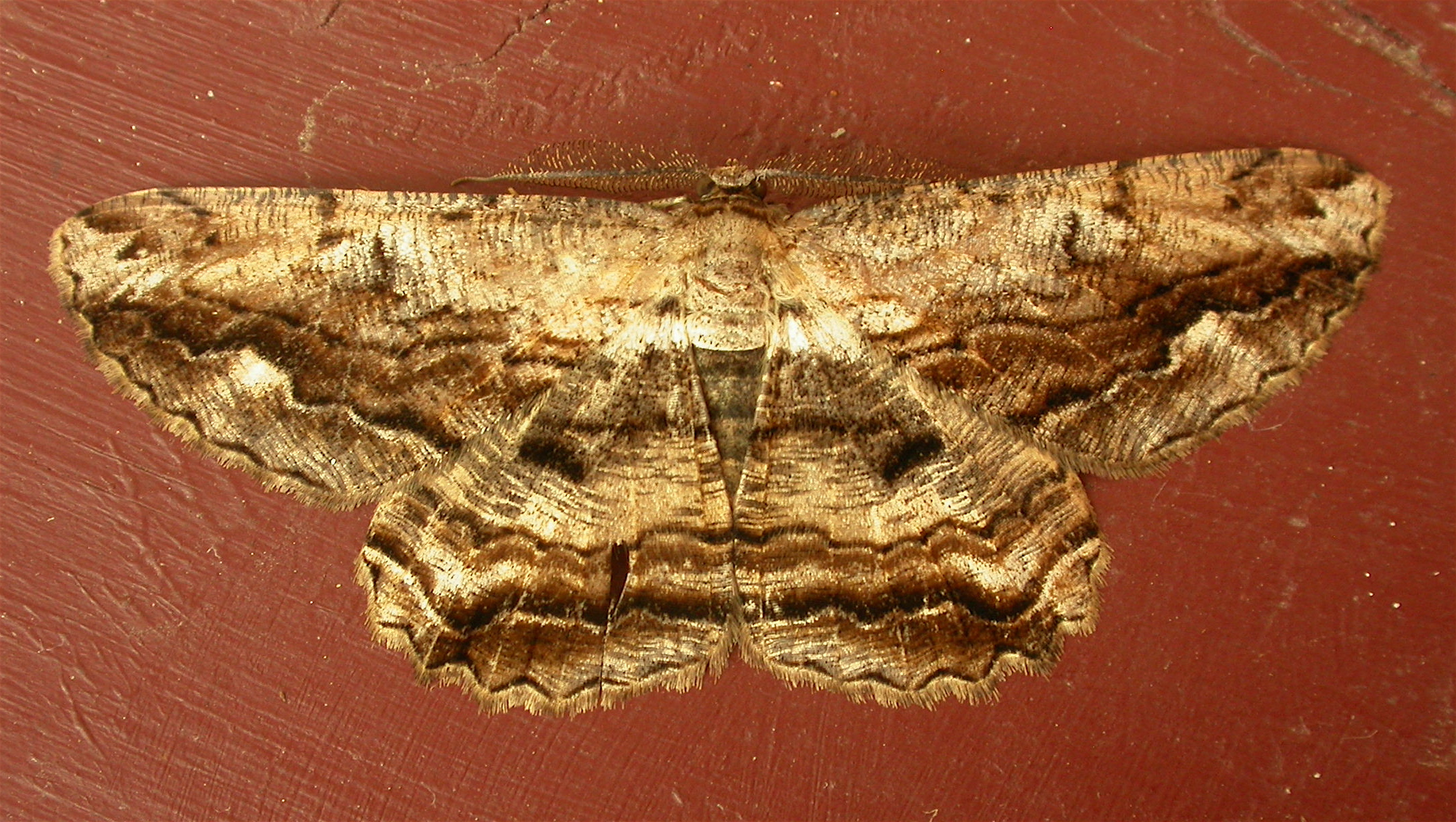

Scientific classification
- Kingdom: Animalia
- Phylum: Arthropoda
- Clade: Pancrustacea
- Class: Insecta
- Order: Lepidoptera
- Family: Geometridae
- Genus: Scioglyptis
- Species: S. lyciaria

Binomial name
- Scioglyptis lyciaria (Guenée, 1857)

Synonyms
- Parathemis poecilaria; Boarmia lyciaria Guenée, 1857; Boarmia poecilaria Guenée, 1857; Boarmia semitata Walker, 1860

= Scioglyptis lyciaria =

Species of moth

Scioglyptis lyciaria, the white-patch bark moth, is a moth of the family Geometridae that occurs in Australia. The species was first described by Achille Guenée in 1857.

== Description ==
=== Caterpillar ===
At its last instar the larvae will be around 50 mm. Like most other members of Geometridae the larvae has a twig-like appearance being mostly brown with small knob like horns, these horns are small and red. The head is slightly higher than the rest of the body to form two forward pointing knobs.

=== Adult ===
The adult's wingspan is 40 mm. The termen of the forewings and hindwings have a wavy edge with a black bordering subterminal line. The moth varies from light brown to dark brown and the underside is lighter with a dark brown terminal border and a dark brown spot in the outer edge of each wing.

== Life cycle ==
Eggs are laid in the crevices of the host plant in April. The egg colouration differs between the females, when first laid they are closer to cream but as they age they go through yellows, greens and later browns. They are oval and have microscopic crenulated ribs. The larvae then feed for two to three months before pupating in a soil cell. After two months of staying in this soil chamber the adult will emerge.

== Larval foods ==
- Acacia mearnsii
- Persoonia falcata
- Exocarpus cupressiformis
- Eucalyptus
