= Stenoporpia vernata =

Scientific classification
- Kingdom: Animalia
- Phylum: Arthropoda
- Class: Insecta
- Order: Lepidoptera
- Family: Geometridae
- Genus: Stenoporpia
- Species: S. vernata

Binomial name
- Stenoporpia vernata (Barnes & McDunnough, 1917)

Species of moth

Stenoporpia vernata is a species of moth in the family Geometridae. It was described by William Barnes and James Halliday McDunnough in 1910 and is found in North America.

The MONA or Hodges number for Stenoporpia vernata is 6465.
