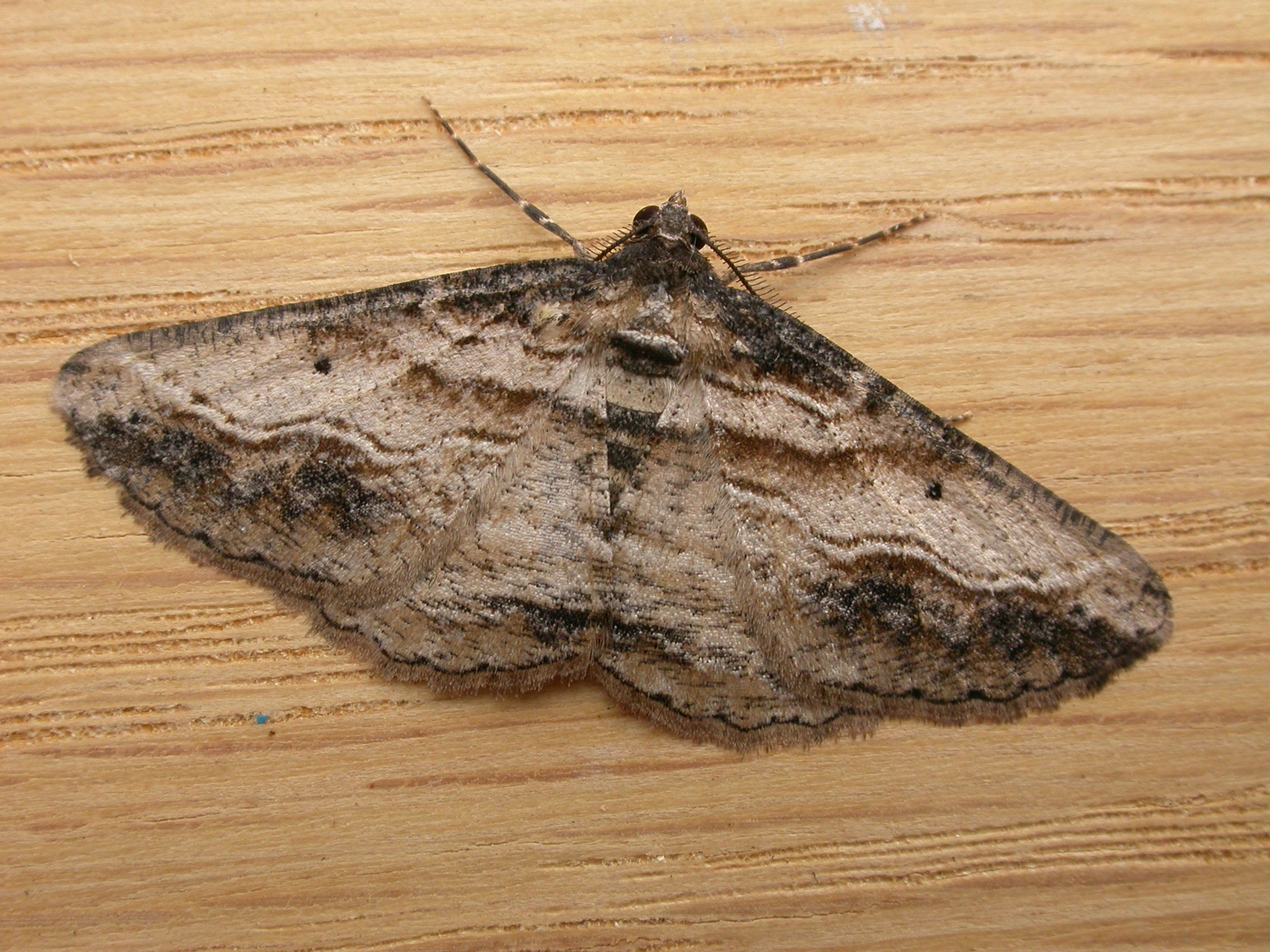

Scientific classification
- Kingdom: Animalia
- Phylum: Arthropoda
- Class: Insecta
- Order: Lepidoptera
- Family: Geometridae
- Genus: Syneora
- Species: S. euboliaria

Binomial name
- Syneora euboliaria Walker, 1860

= Syneora euboliaria =

Species of moth

Syneora euboliaria is a moth of the family Geometridae first described by Francis Walker in 1860. It is found in Australia.

The adult moths of this species are brown with a number of darker zigzag lines on each wing. The wingspan is about 3.5 cms.

The males have feathery antennae, and the females have thread-like antennae.
