= Stenoporpia insipidaria =

Scientific classification
- Domain: Eukaryota
- Kingdom: Animalia
- Phylum: Arthropoda
- Class: Insecta
- Order: Lepidoptera
- Family: Geometridae
- Tribe: Boarmiini
- Genus: Stenoporpia
- Species: S. insipidaria

Binomial name
- Stenoporpia insipidaria McDunnough, 1945

Species of moth

Stenoporpia insipidaria is a species of geometrid moth in the family Geometridae. It is found in North America.

The MONA or Hodges number for Stenoporpia insipidaria is 6467.
