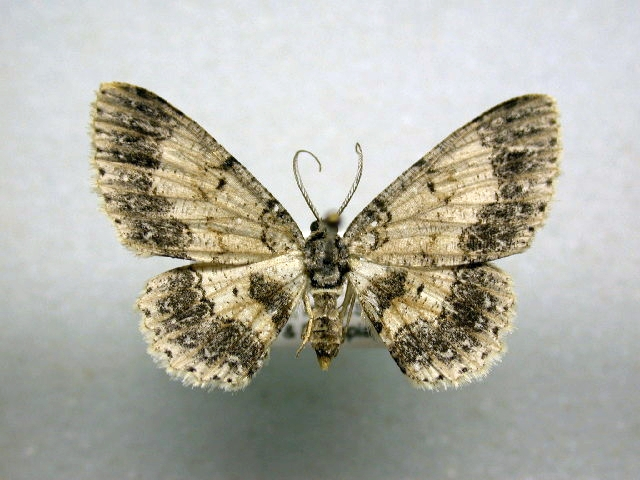

Scientific classification
- Kingdom: Animalia
- Phylum: Arthropoda
- Class: Insecta
- Order: Lepidoptera
- Family: Geometridae
- Genus: Stenalcidia
- Species: S. latimedia

Binomial name
- Stenalcidia latimedia Warren, 1904

= Stenalcidia latimedia =

Species of moth

Stenalcidia latimedia is a moth in the family Geometridae. It is found in Ecuador.
