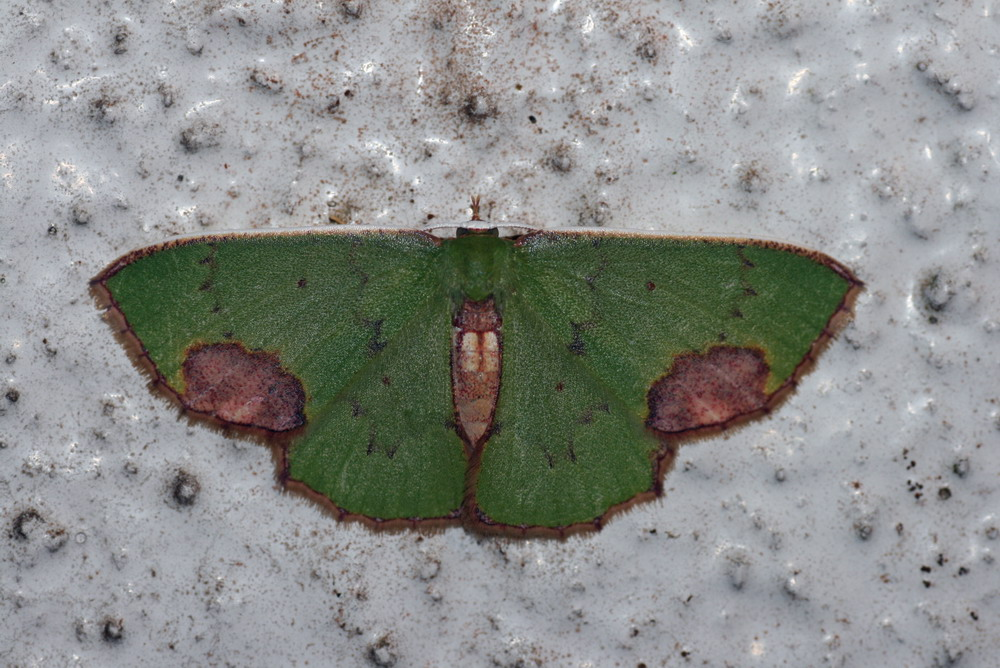

Scientific classification
- Kingdom: Animalia
- Phylum: Arthropoda
- Class: Insecta
- Order: Lepidoptera
- Family: Geometridae
- Genus: Spaniocentra
- Species: S. hollowayi

Binomial name
- Spaniocentra hollowayi Inoue, 1986

= Spaniocentra hollowayi =

Species of moth

Spaniocentra hollowayi is a species of moth of the family Geometridae. It is found in Taiwan and Japan.

The wingspan is 25–30 mm.
