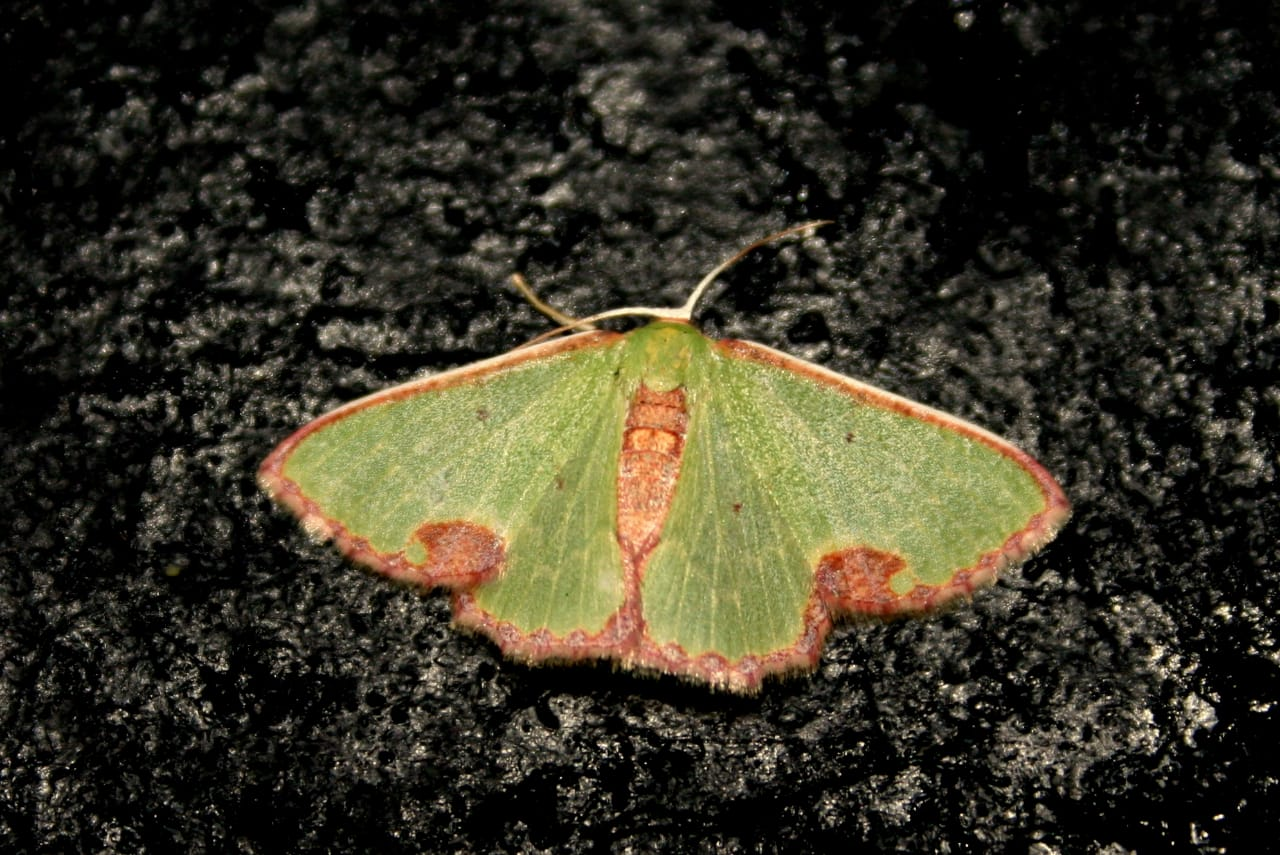

Scientific classification
- Kingdom: Animalia
- Phylum: Arthropoda
- Clade: Pancrustacea
- Class: Insecta
- Order: Lepidoptera
- Family: Geometridae
- Genus: Spaniocentra
- Species: S. pannosa

Binomial name
- Spaniocentra pannosa Moore, 1887

= Spaniocentra pannosa =

Species of moth

Spaniocentra pannosa is a moth of the family Geometridae first described by Frederic Moore in 1887. It is found in Sri Lanka.

The adult is greenish with some brown patches at the margin towards the hindwings. The caterpillar is greenish, twig like and slender with a conical protuberance. Spiracles are black. The caterpillar feeds on Loranthus species.
