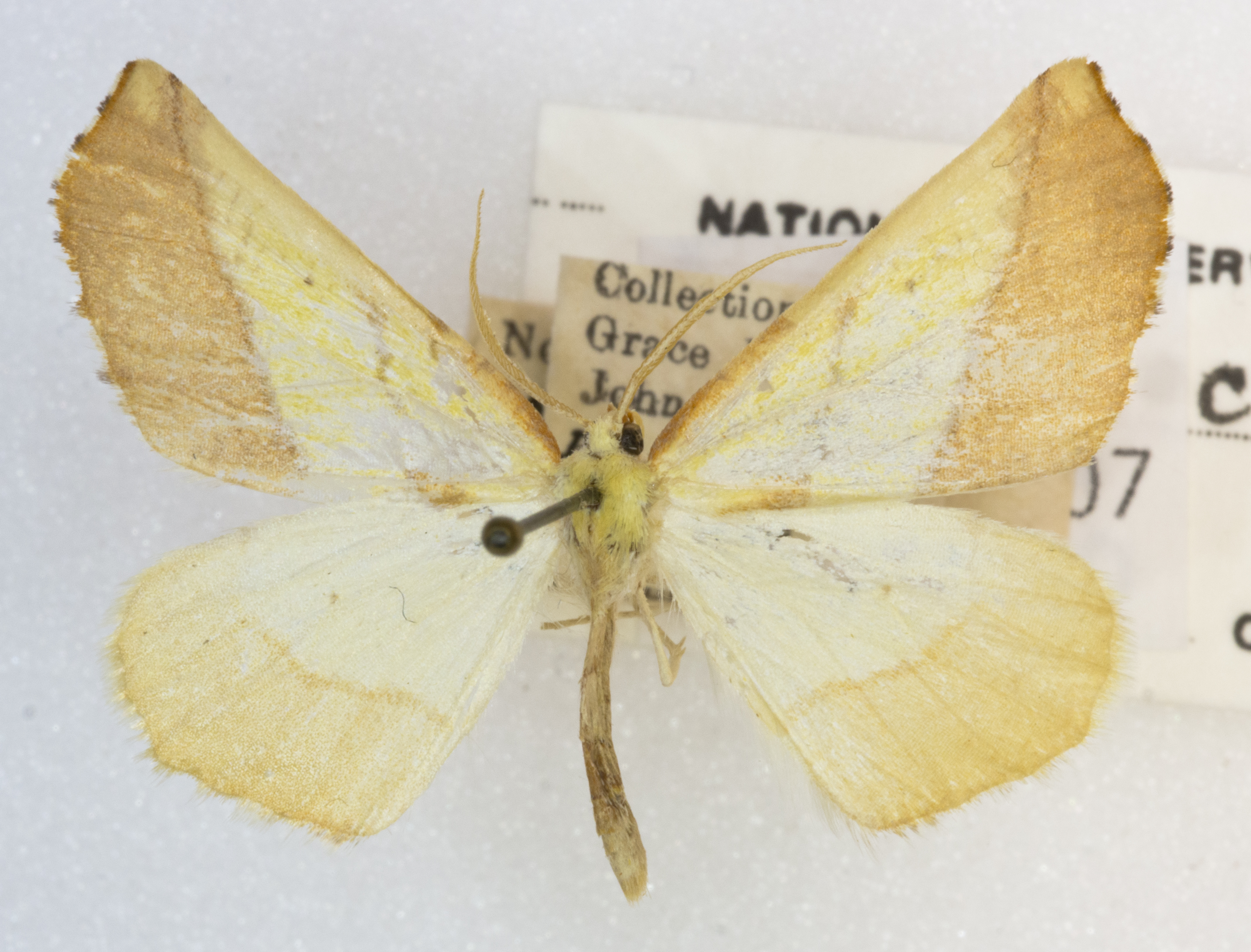

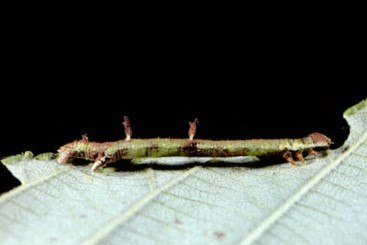
- Adult (top) and larva (bottom)

Scientific classification
- Kingdom: Animalia
- Phylum: Arthropoda
- Clade: Pancrustacea
- Class: Insecta
- Order: Lepidoptera
- Family: Geometridae
- Genus: Sicya
- Species: S. crocearia

Binomial name
- Sicya crocearia Packard, 1873

= Sicya crocearia =

Species of moth

Sicya crocearia is a species of geometrid moth in the family Geometridae. It is found in North America.
