= Stenoporpia dionaria =

Scientific classification
- Domain: Eukaryota
- Kingdom: Animalia
- Phylum: Arthropoda
- Class: Insecta
- Order: Lepidoptera
- Family: Geometridae
- Genus: Stenoporpia
- Species: S. dionaria

Binomial name
- Stenoporpia dionaria (Barnes & McDunnough, 1918)

Species of moth

Stenoporpia dionaria is a species of moth in the family Geometridae first described by William Barnes and James Halliday McDunnough in 1918. It is found in North America.

The MONA or Hodges number for Stenoporpia dionaria is 6458.
