= Stenoporpia anastomosaria =

Scientific classification
- Domain: Eukaryota
- Kingdom: Animalia
- Phylum: Arthropoda
- Class: Insecta
- Order: Lepidoptera
- Family: Geometridae
- Tribe: Boarmiini
- Genus: Stenoporpia
- Species: S. anastomosaria

Binomial name
- Stenoporpia anastomosaria (Grossbeck, 1908)

Species of moth

Stenoporpia anastomosaria is a species of geometrid moth in the family Geometridae. It is found in North America.

The MONA or Hodges number for Stenoporpia anastomosaria is 6462.
