= Stenoporpia graciella =

Scientific classification
- Domain: Eukaryota
- Kingdom: Animalia
- Phylum: Arthropoda
- Class: Insecta
- Order: Lepidoptera
- Family: Geometridae
- Tribe: Boarmiini
- Genus: Stenoporpia
- Species: S. graciella

Binomial name
- Stenoporpia graciella McDunnough, 1940

Species of moth

Stenoporpia graciella is a species of geometrid moth in the family Geometridae. It is found in North America.

The MONA or Hodges number for Stenoporpia graciella is 6476.
