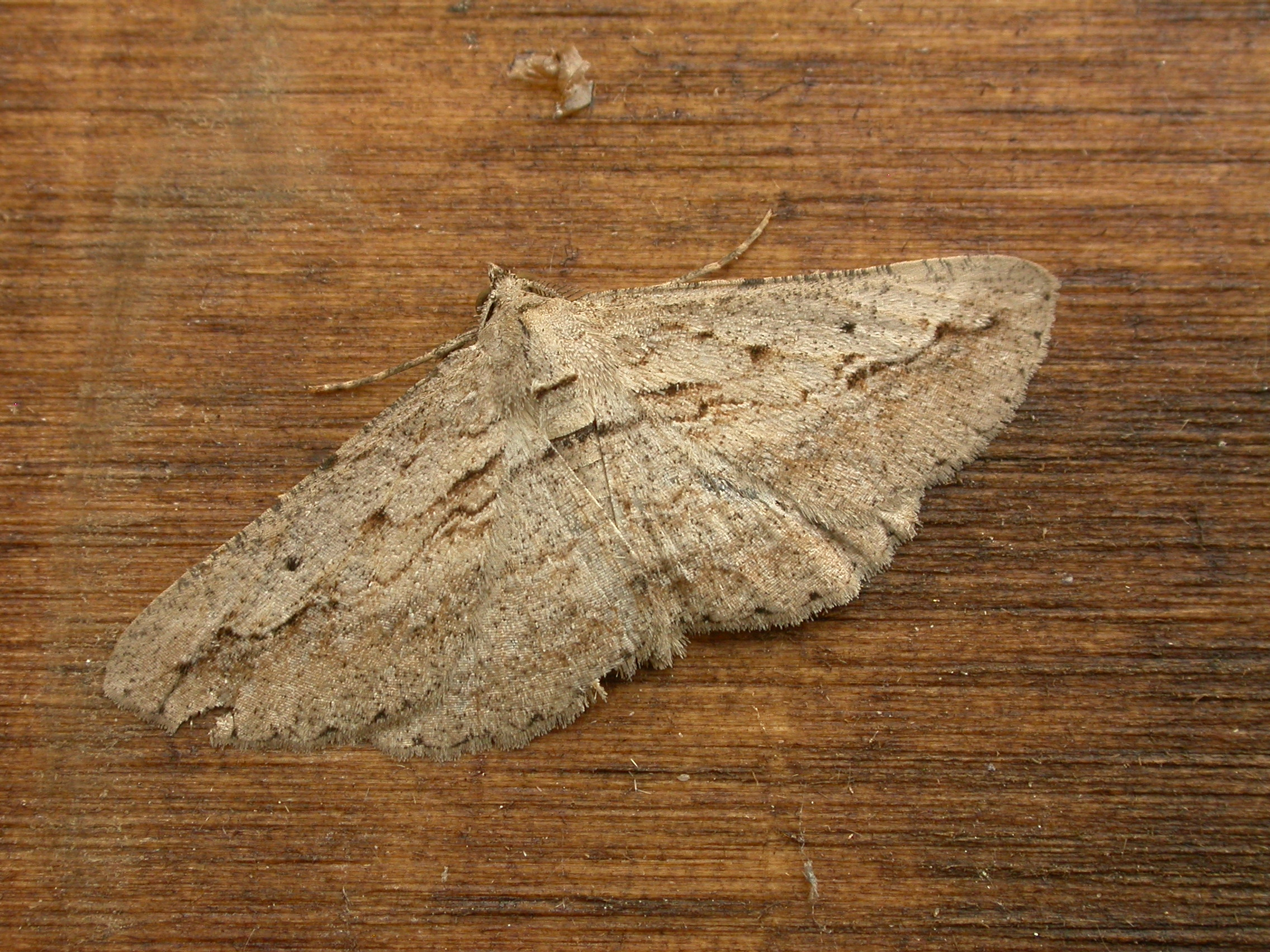

Scientific classification
- Kingdom: Animalia
- Phylum: Arthropoda
- Class: Insecta
- Order: Lepidoptera
- Family: Geometridae
- Genus: Syneora
- Species: S. excursaria

Binomial name
- Syneora excursaria (Walker, 1863)

Synonyms
- Hemerophila excursaria Walker, 1863

= Syneora excursaria =

Species of moth

Syneora excursaria is a moth of the family Geometridae first described by Francis Walker in 1863. It is known from Australia.
