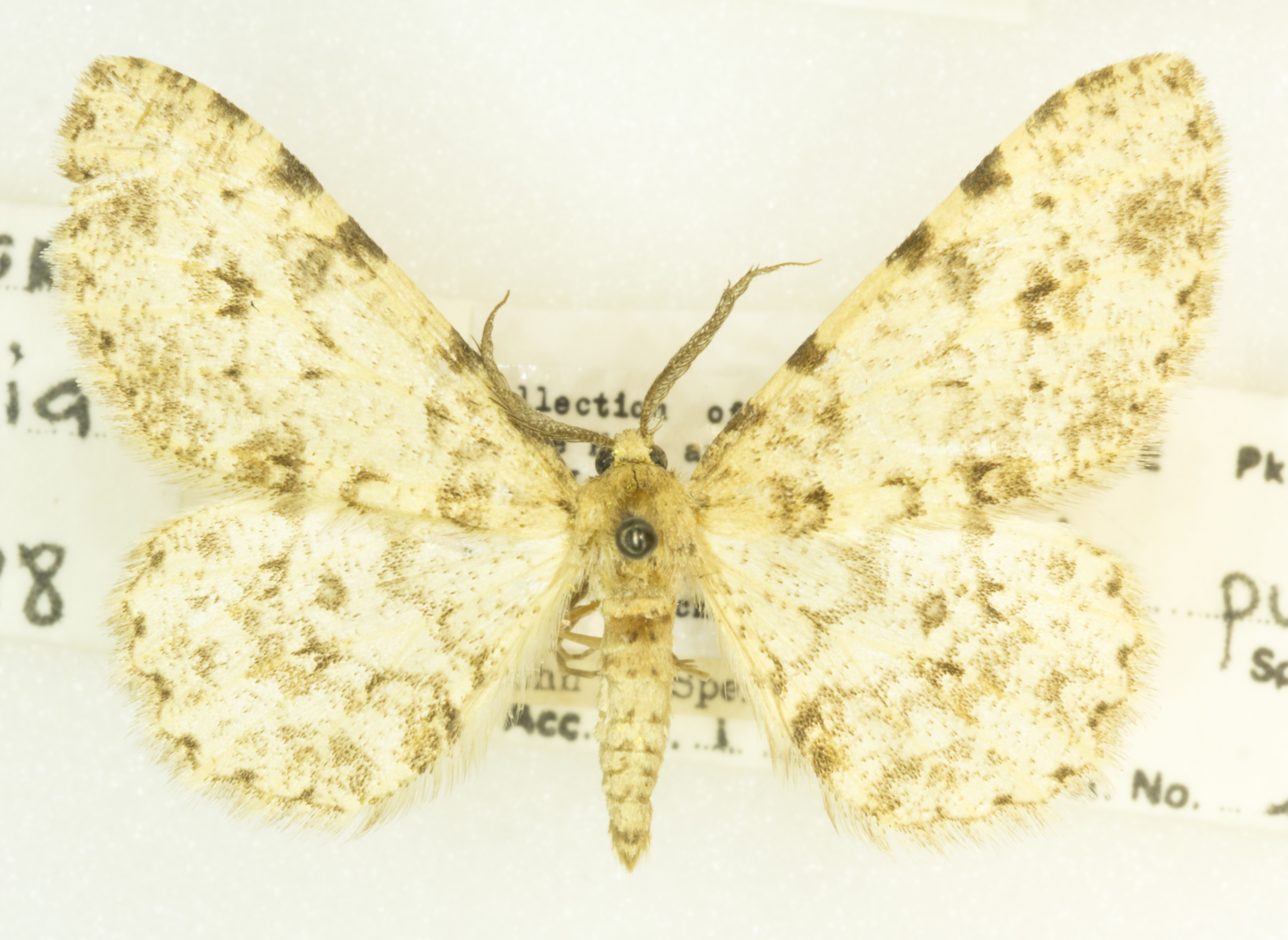

Scientific classification
- Kingdom: Animalia
- Phylum: Arthropoda
- Clade: Pancrustacea
- Class: Insecta
- Order: Lepidoptera
- Family: Geometridae
- Genus: Stenoporpia
- Species: S. pulchella

Binomial name
- Stenoporpia pulchella (Grossbeck, 1909)

= Stenoporpia pulchella =

Species of moth

Stenoporpia pulchella is a species of geometrid moth in the family Geometridae. It is found in North America.

== Subspecies ==
These two subspecies belong to the species Stenoporpia pulchella:

- Stenoporpia pulchella coolidgearia Dyar, 1923
- Stenoporpia pulchella pulchella
