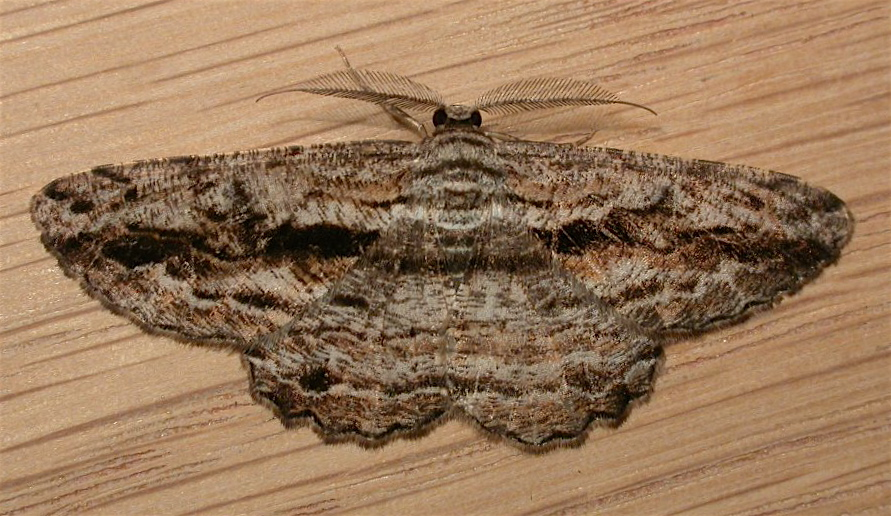

Scientific classification
- Domain: Eukaryota
- Kingdom: Animalia
- Phylum: Arthropoda
- Class: Insecta
- Order: Lepidoptera
- Family: Geometridae
- Genus: Scioglyptis
- Species: S. chionomera

Binomial name
- Scioglyptis chionomera (Lower, 1893)

Synonyms
- Diastictis chionomera Lower, 1893

= Scioglyptis chionomera =

Species of moth

Scioglyptis chionomera, the grey-patch bark moth, is a species of moth of the family Geometridae first described by Oswald Bertram Lower in 1893. It is found in Australia, in Queensland, New South Wales, Australian Capital Territory, Victoria, Tasmania and South Australia.
