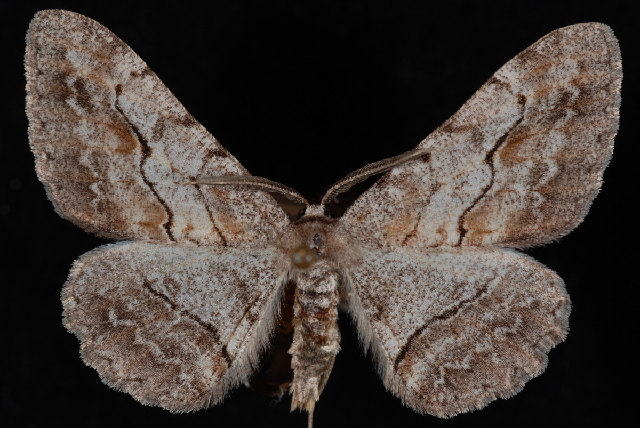

Scientific classification
- Kingdom: Animalia
- Phylum: Arthropoda
- Class: Insecta
- Order: Lepidoptera
- Family: Geometridae
- Genus: Stenoporpia
- Species: S. pulmonaria

Binomial name
- Stenoporpia pulmonaria (Grote, 1881)

= Stenoporpia pulmonaria =

Species of moth

Stenoporpia pulmonaria is a species of geometrid moth in the family Geometridae. It is found in North America.

The MONA or Hodges number for Stenoporpia pulmonaria is 6463.

== Subspecies ==
These seven subspecies belong to the species Stenoporpia pulmonaria:

- Stenoporpia pulmonaria albescens Hulst, 1896
- Stenoporpia pulmonaria blattifera Rindge, 1968
- Stenoporpia pulmonaria dejecta Hulst, 1896
- Stenoporpia pulmonaria lita Rindge, 1968
- Stenoporpia pulmonaria pulmonaria
- Stenoporpia pulmonaria satisfacta Barnes & McDunnough, 1916
- Stenoporpia pulmonaria vicaria Rindge, 1968
