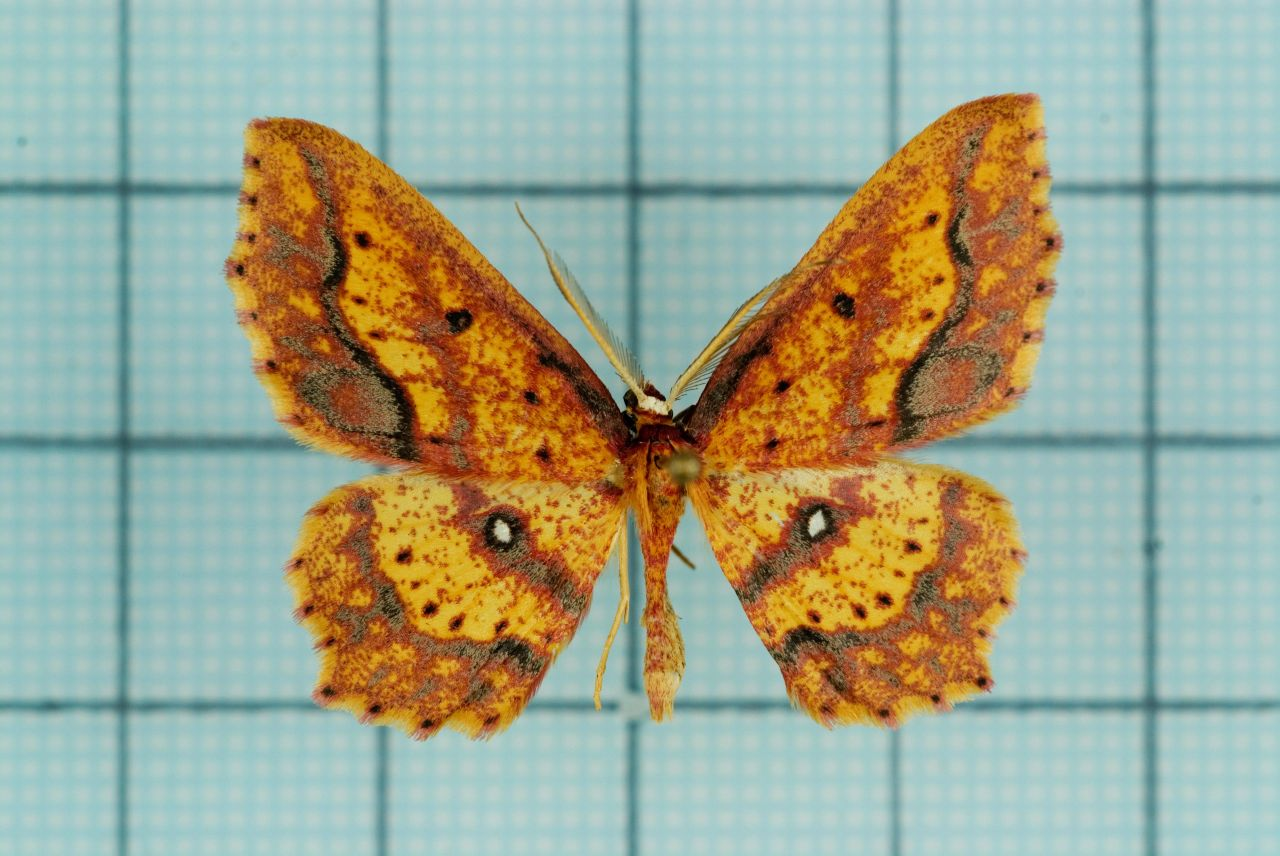
- Female
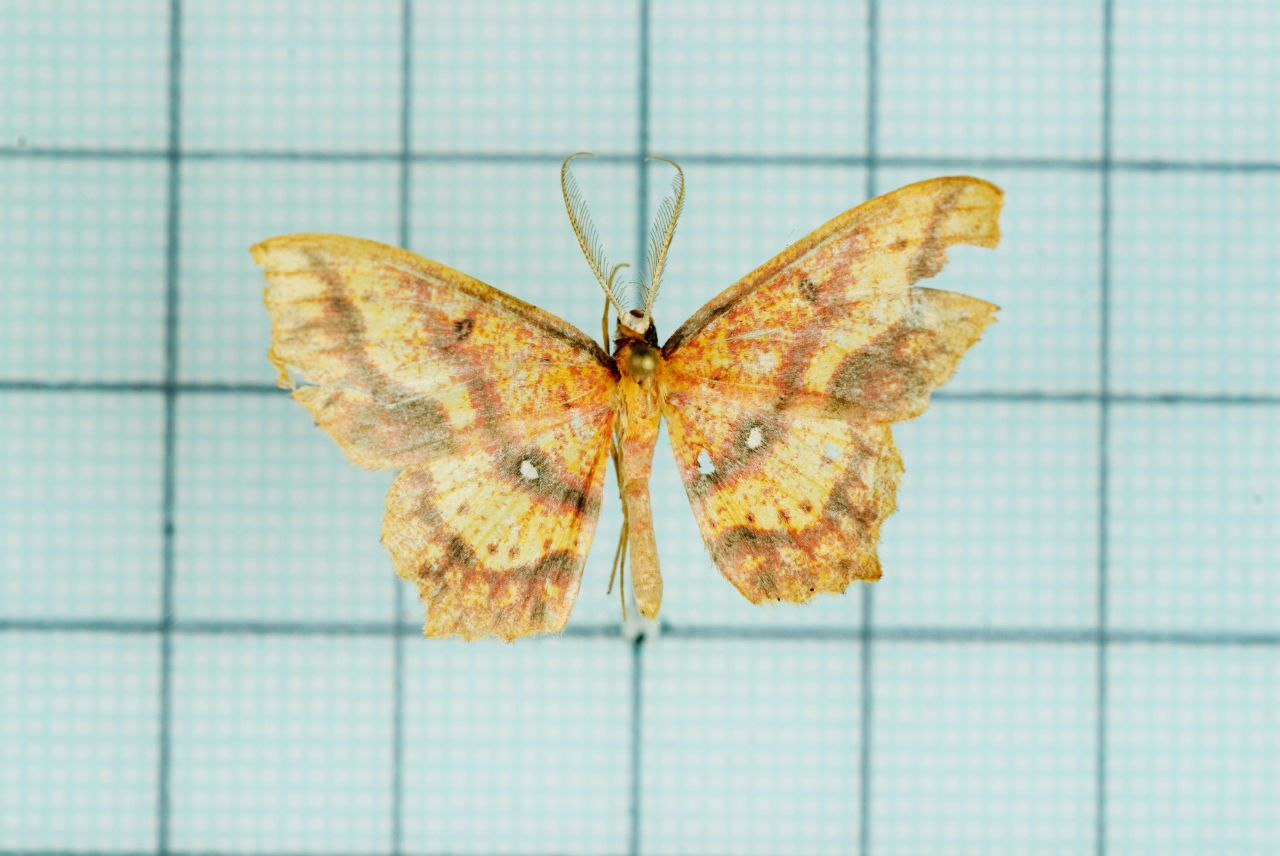
- Male

Scientific classification
- Kingdom: Animalia
- Phylum: Arthropoda
- Class: Insecta
- Order: Lepidoptera
- Family: Geometridae
- Genus: Synegiodes
- Species: S. histrionaria

Binomial name
- Synegiodes histrionaria C. Swinhoe, 1892

Synonyms
- Spilopera ornata Bastelberger, 1909; Anisodes lentiginosaria Wileman, 1911

= Synegiodes histrionaria =

Species of moth

Synegiodes histrionaria is a species of moth of the family Geometridae first described by Charles Swinhoe in 1892. It is found in Taiwan and India.

== Subspecies ==
- Synegiodes histrionaria histrionaria
- Synegiodes histrionaria ornata (Bastelberger, 1909) (Taiwan)
