= Stenoporpia glaucomarginaria =

Scientific classification
- Kingdom: Animalia
- Phylum: Arthropoda
- Class: Insecta
- Order: Lepidoptera
- Family: Geometridae
- Genus: Stenoporpia
- Species: S. glaucomarginaria

Binomial name
- Stenoporpia glaucomarginaria McDunnough, 1945

Species of moth

Stenoporpia glaucomarginaria is a species of geometrid moth in the family Geometridae. It was described by James Halliday McDunnough in 1945 and is found in North America.

The MONA or Hodges number for Stenoporpia glaucomarginaria is 6472.
