= Sicya morsicaria =

Scientific classification
- Domain: Eukaryota
- Kingdom: Animalia
- Phylum: Arthropoda
- Class: Insecta
- Order: Lepidoptera
- Family: Geometridae
- Genus: Sicya
- Species: S. morsicaria

Binomial name
- Sicya morsicaria (Hulst, 1886)

Species of moth

Sicya morsicaria is a species of geometrid moth in the family Geometridae. It is found in North America.

The MONA or Hodges number for Sicya morsicaria is 6915.
