= Sundagrapha =

Scientific classification
- Kingdom: Animalia
- Phylum: Arthropoda
- Clade: Pancrustacea
- Class: Insecta
- Order: Lepidoptera
- Family: Geometridae
- Genus: Sundagrapha; Holloway, 1982

Genus of moths

Sundagrapha is a genus of moths in the family Geometridae erected by Jeremy Daniel Holloway in 1982.

== Species ==
- Sundagrapha tenebrosa (Swinhoe, 1902) Singapore, Peninsular Malaysia, Borneo
- Sundagrapha lepidata (Prout, 1916) Borneo
