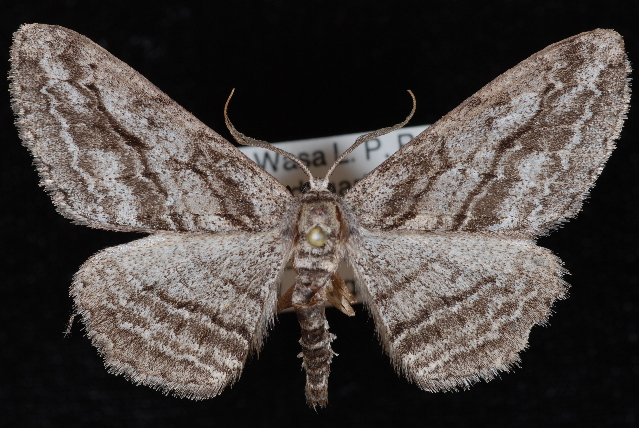
- Stenoporpia excelsaria
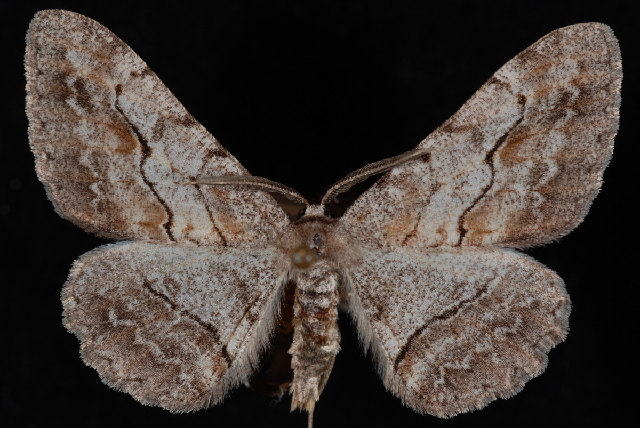
- Stenoporpia pulmonaria

Scientific classification
- Kingdom: Animalia
- Phylum: Arthropoda
- Class: Insecta
- Order: Lepidoptera
- Family: Geometridae
- Tribe: Boarmiini
- Genus: Stenoporpia; McDunnough, 1920

= Stenoporpia =

Genus of moths

Stenoporpia is a genus of moths in the family Geometridae erected by James Halliday McDunnough in 1920.

== Species ==
- Stenoporpia pulchella (Grossbeck, 1909)
- Stenoporpia margueritae Rindge, 1968
- Stenoporpia asymmetra Rindge, 1959
- Stenoporpia dionaria (Barnes & McDunnough, 1918)
- Stenoporpia polygrammaria (Packard, 1876)
- Stenoporpia mediatra Rindge, 1958
- Stenoporpia dissonaria (Hulst, 1896)
- Stenoporpia anastomosaria (Grossbeck, 1908)
- Stenoporpia pulmonaria (Grote, 1881)
- Stenoporpia purpuraria (Barnes & McDunnough, 1913)
- Stenoporpia vernata (Barnes & McDunnough, 1917)
- Stenoporpia vernalell McDunnough, 1940
- Stenoporpia insipidaria McDunnough, 1945
- Stenoporpia anellula (Barnes & McDunnough, 1917)
- Stenoporpia badia Rindge, 1968
- Stenoporpia macdunnoughi Sperry, 1938
- Stenoporpia blanchardi Rindge, 1968
- Stenoporpia glaucomarginaria McDunnough, 1945
- Stenoporpia separataria (Grote, 1883)
- Stenoporpia excelsaria (Strecker, 1899)
- Stenoporpia larga Rindge, 1968
- Stenoporpia graciella McDunnough, 1940
- Stenoporpia lea Rindge, 1968
