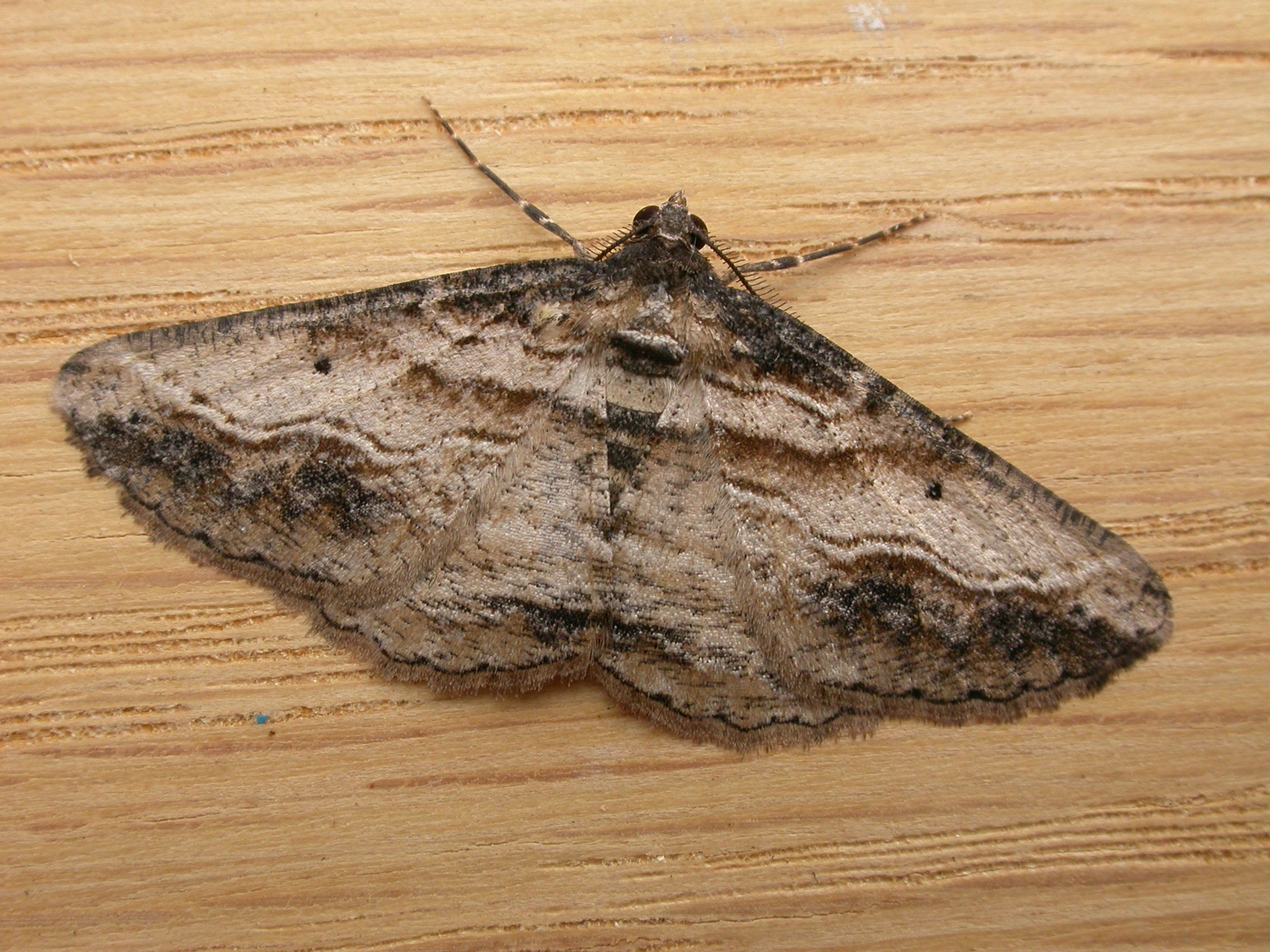
- Syneora euboliaria

Scientific classification
- Domain: Eukaryota
- Kingdom: Animalia
- Phylum: Arthropoda
- Class: Insecta
- Order: Lepidoptera
- Family: Geometridae
- Tribe: Boarmiini
- Genus: Syneora; Turner, 1917

= Syneora =

Genus of moths

Syneora is a genus of moths in the family Geometridae erected by Alfred Jefferis Turner in 1917. All the species are found in Australia.

== Species ==
- Syneora cheleuta (Meyrick, 1892)
- Syneora leucanthes (Turner, 1947)
- Syneora excursaria (Walker, [1863])
- Syneora euboliaria (Walker, 1860)
- Syneora mundifera (Walker, 1860)
- Syneora silicaria (Guenée, 1857)
- Syneora praecisa (Turner, 1917)
- Syneora lithina (Warren, 1897)
- Syneora emmelodes (Turner, 1904)
- Syneora hemeropa (Meyrick, 1892)
- Syneora nigrilinea Goldfinch, 1944
- Syneora amphiclina (Meyrick, 1892)
- Syneora fractata (Walker, 1862)
- Syneora gypsochroa (Turner, 1947)
- Syneora adelphodes (Meyrick, 1892)
- Syneora cymatomita (Turner, 1947)
- Syneora mesochra (Turner, 1947)
- Syneora strixata (Walker, 1862)
- Syneora acclinis (Turner, 1947)
- Syneora odontosticha (Turner, 1947)
- Syneora acrotypa (Turner, 1917)
