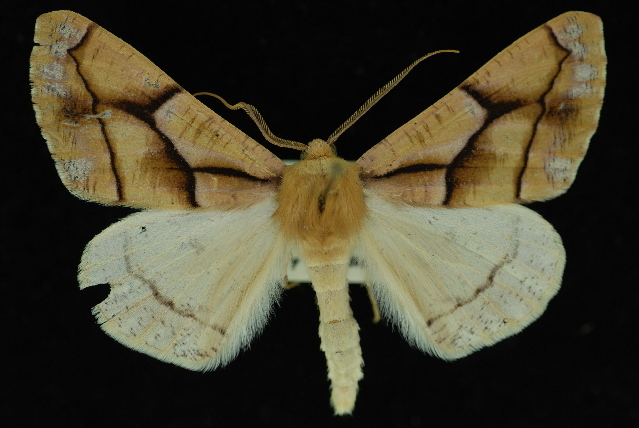

Scientific classification
- Kingdom: Animalia
- Phylum: Arthropoda
- Class: Insecta
- Order: Lepidoptera
- Family: Geometridae
- Genus: Snowia; Neumoegen, 1884
- Species: S. montanaria

Binomial name
- Snowia montanaria Neumoegen, 1884

= Snowia =

Genus of moths

Snowia is a monotypic moth genus in the family Geometridae. Its only species, Snowia montanaria, is known from North America. Both the genus and species were first described by Berthold Neumoegen in 1884. It is found in North America.

The MONA or Hodges number for Snowia montanaria is 6875.
