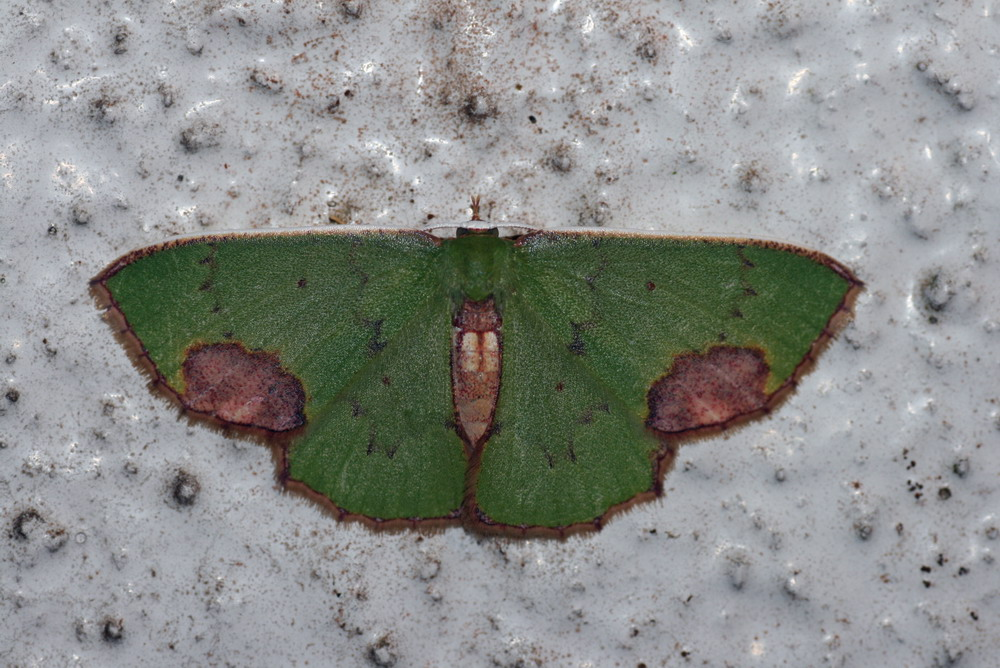

Scientific classification
- Kingdom: Animalia
- Phylum: Arthropoda
- Clade: Pancrustacea
- Class: Insecta
- Order: Lepidoptera
- Family: Geometridae
- Tribe: Hemitheini
- Genus: Spaniocentra; Prout

= Spaniocentra =

Genus of moths

Spaniocentra is a genus of moths in the family Geometridae described by Prout.

== Species ==
Species include:

- Spaniocentra apatella western Philippines, Sulawesi
- Spaniocentra apatelloides Holloway, 1996 Borneo
- Spaniocentra hollowayi Inoue, 1986
- Spaniocentra intermediata Prout Sulawesi
- Spaniocentra lobata Holloway, 1982 Borneo
- Spaniocentra megaspilaria (Guenée, 1857) Borneo
- Spaniocentra pannosa Moore, 1887 Sri Lanka
- Spaniocentra undiferata Walker Sulawesi
