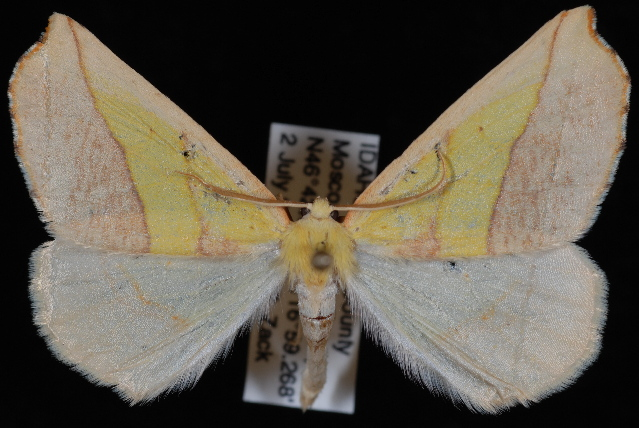
- Sicya macularia

Scientific classification
- Kingdom: Animalia
- Phylum: Arthropoda
- Class: Insecta
- Order: Lepidoptera
- Family: Geometridae
- Tribe: Ourapterygini
- Genus: Sicya; Guenée, 1857

= Sicya =

Genus of moths

Sicya is a genus of moths in the family Geometridae erected by Achille Guenée in 1857.

== Species ==
- Sicya crocearia Packard, 1873
- Sicya macularia (Harris, 1850)
- Sicya laetula Barnes & McDunnough, 1917
- Sicya pergilvaria Barnes & McDunnough, 1917
- Sicya morsicaria (Hulst, 1886)
- Sicya olivata Barnes & McDunnough, 1916
- Sicya medangula Dyar, 1918
