= Sesquialtera (moth) =

Scientific classification
- Kingdom: Animalia
- Phylum: Arthropoda
- Clade: Pancrustacea
- Class: Insecta
- Order: Lepidoptera
- Family: Geometridae
- Genus: Sesquialtera; L. B. Prout, 1916

Genus of moths

Sesquialtera is a genus of moths in the family Geometridae erected by Louis Beethoven Prout in 1916.

== Species ==
- Sesquialtera audens Prout, 1931
- Sesquialtera lonchota Prout, 1931
- Sesquialtera ramecourti Herbulot, 1967
- Sesquialtera ridicula Prout, 1916 – Namibia, Ethiopia, Kenya, Somalia, and South Africa
