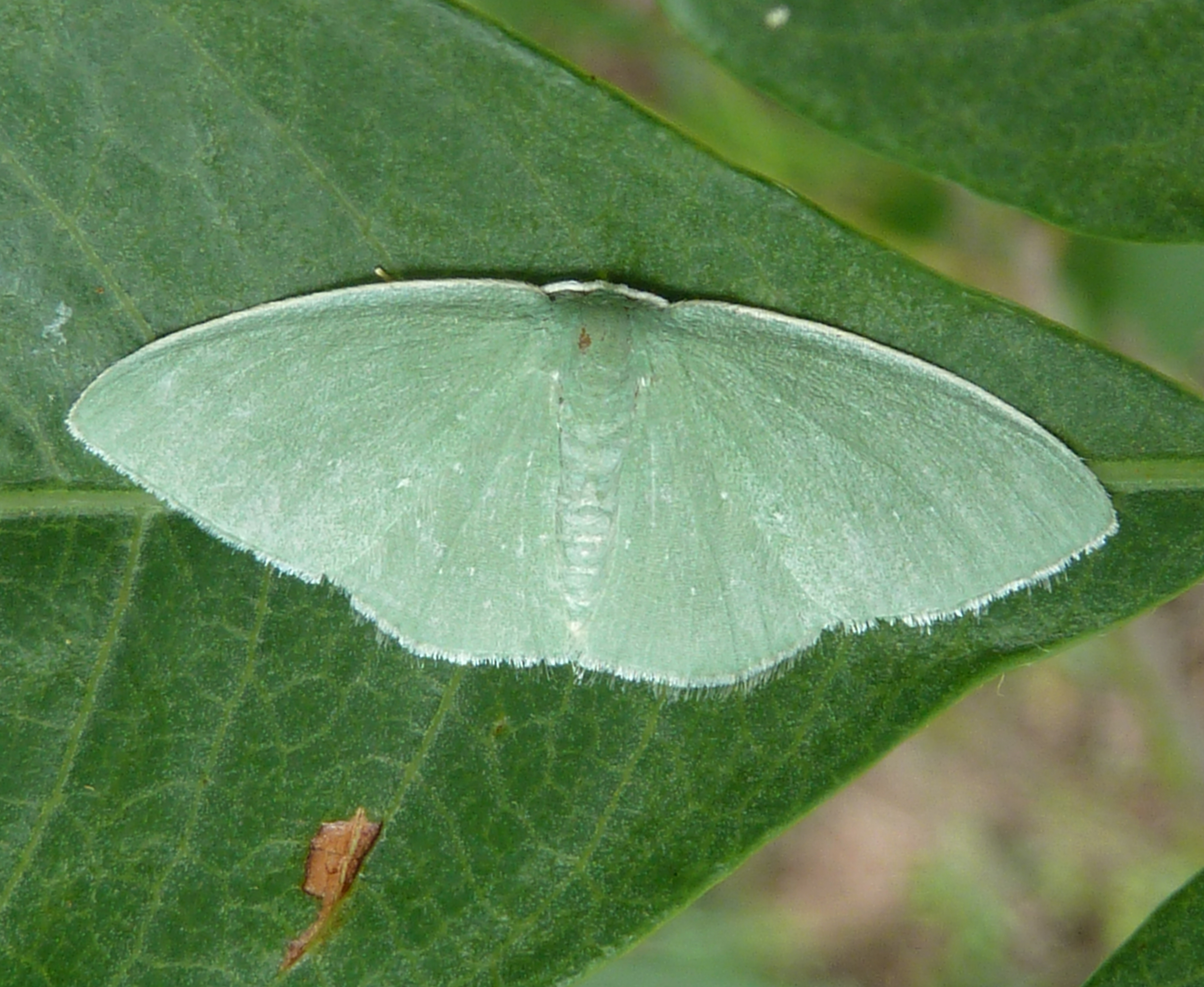
- S. invenusta in South Africa

Scientific classification
- Kingdom: Animalia
- Phylum: Arthropoda
- Class: Insecta
- Order: Lepidoptera
- Family: Geometridae
- Genus: Syndromodes; Warren, 1897

= Syndromodes =

Genus of moths

Syndromodes is a genus of moths in the family Geometridae.

Species include:

- Syndromodes cellulata
- Syndromodes dimensa
- Syndromodes invenusta
- Syndromodes oedocnemis
- Syndromodes prasinops
- Syndromodes unicolor
