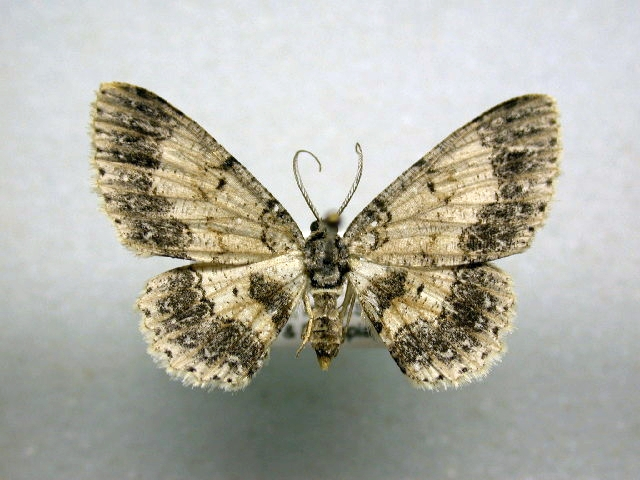
- Stenalcidia latimedia

Scientific classification
- Kingdom: Animalia
- Phylum: Arthropoda
- Class: Insecta
- Order: Lepidoptera
- Family: Geometridae
- Subfamily: Ennominae
- Genus: Stenalcidia; Warren, 1897

= Stenalcidia =

Genus of moths

Stenalcidia is a genus of moths in the family Geometridae.

== Species ==
- Stenalcidia biniola Dognin, 1900
- Stenalcidia binotata (Warren, 1907)
- Stenalcidia cariaria (Schaus, 1897)
- Stenalcidia castaneata Warren, 1907
- Stenalcidia celosoides (Dognin, 1895)
- Stenalcidia cervinifusa Dognin, 1906
- Stenalcidia congruata (Walker, 1863)
- Stenalcidia constipata Dognin, 1908
- Stenalcidia contempta Prout, 1931
- Stenalcidia conveniens Dognin, 1907
- Stenalcidia cretaria Bastelberger, 1908
- Stenalcidia curvifera Dognin, 1906
- Stenalcidia defimaria (Guenee, 1858)
- Stenalcidia delgada (Dognin, 1895)
- Stenalcidia despecta Prout, 1910
- Stenalcidia dimidiaria (Guenee, 1858)
- Stenalcidia dukinfieldia (Schaus, 1897)
- Stenalcidia elongaria (Snellen, 1874)
- Stenalcidia farinosa Warren, 1897
- Stenalcidia fumibrunnea Warren, 1904
- Stenalcidia fusca Warren, 1897
- Stenalcidia gofa (Dognin, 1895)
- Stenalcidia grisea Warren, 1900
- Stenalcidia guttata Warren, 1904
- Stenalcidia illaevigata (Maassen, 1890)
- Stenalcidia illineata Dognin, 1906
- Stenalcidia inclinataria (Walker, 1860)
- Stenalcidia invenusta Dognin, 1904
- Stenalcidia junctilinea (Warren, 1901)
- Stenalcidia lacra (Dognin, 1895)
- Stenalcidia latimedia Warren, 1904
- Stenalcidia mergiata (Felder Rogenhofer, 1875)
- Stenalcidia micaya Dognin, 1900
- Stenalcidia nigrilineata Dognin, 1900
- Stenalcidia nitens Warren, 1906
- Stenalcidia odysiata (Snellen, 1874)
- Stenalcidia pallida Dognin, 1918
- Stenalcidia pergriseata Warren, 1901
- Stenalcidia perstrigata (Warren, 1897)
- Stenalcidia piperacia Dognin, 1912
- Stenalcidia plenaria (Walker, 1860)
- Stenalcidia plexilinea Dognin, 1909
- Stenalcidia plumosa (Warren, 1904)
- Stenalcidia praeparata Prout, 1910
- Stenalcidia pseudocculta Dognin, 1900
- Stenalcidia pulverosa Warren, 1897
- Stenalcidia quisquiliaria (Guenee, 1857)
- Stenalcidia robusta (Warren, 1901)
- Stenalcidia roccaria (Oberthur, 1883)
- Stenalcidia rotunda Prout, 1910
- Stenalcidia sanguistellata (Schaus, 1933)
- Stenalcidia sincera Schaus, 1901
- Stenalcidia spilosata Dognin, 1912
- Stenalcidia tristaria Schaus, 1901
- Stenalcidia udeisata Bastelberger, 1908
- Stenalcidia unidentifera Dyar, 1913
- Stenalcidia vacillaria (Guenee, 1858)
- Stenalcidia viridigrisea Bastelberger, 1909
- Stenalcidia warreni Dognin, 1911
