= Serratophyga =

Scientific classification
- Kingdom: Animalia
- Phylum: Arthropoda
- Clade: Pancrustacea
- Class: Insecta
- Order: Lepidoptera
- Family: Geometridae
- Genus: Serratophyga; Holloway, 1993

Genus of moths

Serratophyga is a genus of moths in the family Geometridae erected by Jeremy Daniel Holloway in 1993.

== Species ==
- Serratophyga subangulata (Warren) north-eastern Himalayas
- Serratophyga xanthospilaria (Wehrli) southern China
- Serratophyga sterrhoticha (Prout, 1937) Bali, Borneo, Sulawesi
