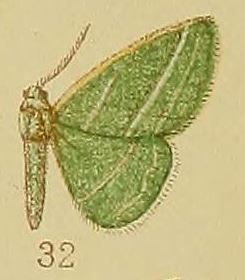
- Syncollesis trilineata

Scientific classification
- Kingdom: Animalia
- Phylum: Arthropoda
- Clade: Pancrustacea
- Class: Insecta
- Order: Lepidoptera
- Family: Geometridae
- Subfamily: Geometrinae
- Genus: Syncollesis; Prout, 1930

= Syncollesis =

Genus of moths

Syncollesis is a genus of moths in the family Geometridae described by Prout in 1930. It includes at least nine species.

== Species ==
- Syncollesis ankalirano Viette, 1981
- Syncollesis bellista (Bethune-Baker, 1913)
- Syncollesis coerulea (Warren, 1896)
- Syncollesis elegans (Prout, 1912)
- Syncollesis idia Prout, 1930
- Syncollesis pauliani Herbulot, 1954
- Syncollesis seydeli Debauche, 1941
- Syncollesis tiviae Prout, 1934
- Syncollesis trilineata (Hampson, 1910)
