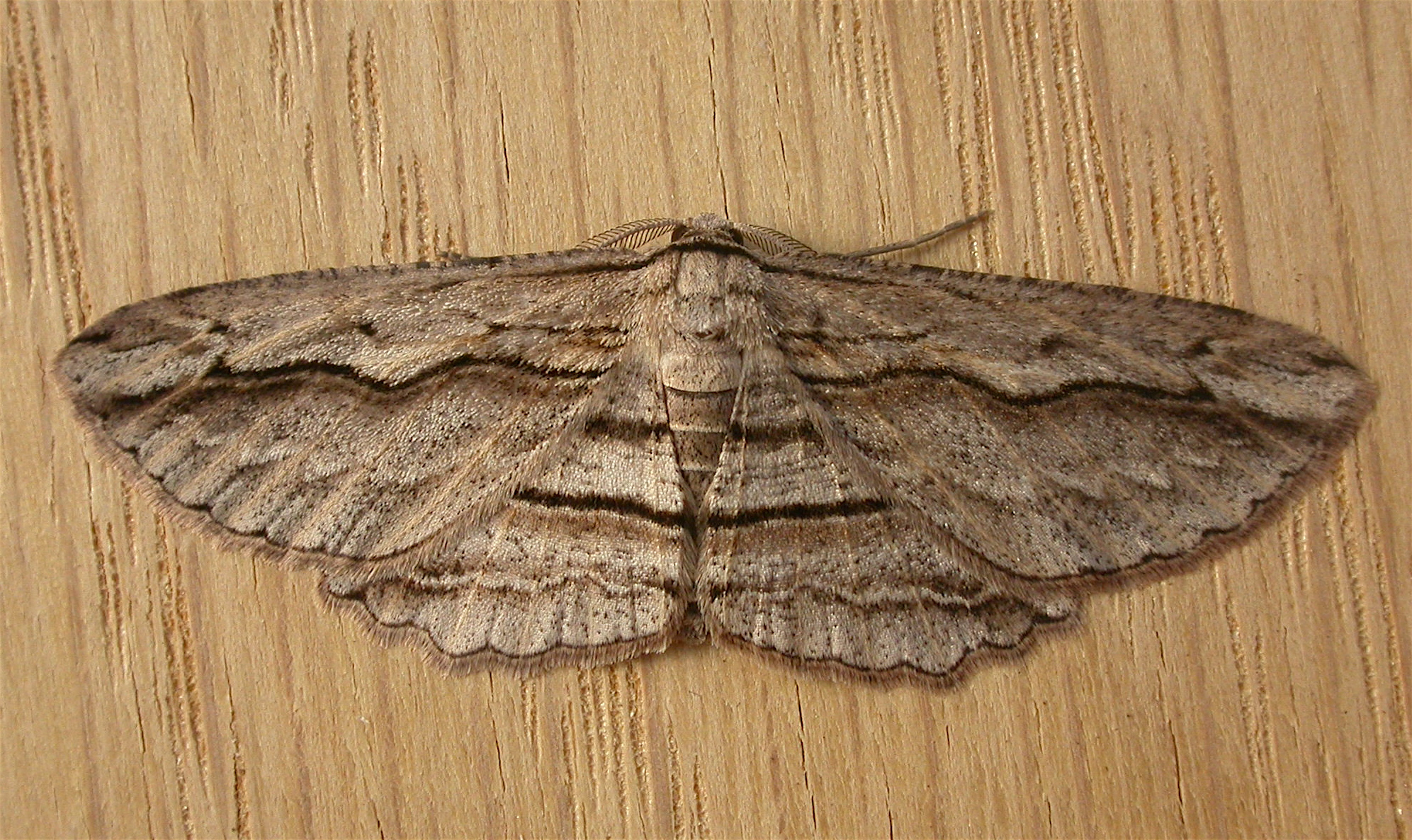
- Scioglyptis loxographa (Turner, 1917), to MV light, Aranda, ACT, October 2008

Scientific classification
- Kingdom: Animalia
- Phylum: Arthropoda
- Class: Insecta
- Order: Lepidoptera
- Family: Geometridae
- Tribe: Boarmiini
- Genus: Scioglyptis

Species
- See text

= Scioglyptis =

Genus of moths

Scioglyptis is a genus of moths in the family Geometridae. It consists of the following species, all of which occur in Australia:

- Scioglyptis canescaria, the type species (as Boarmia canescaria Guenée, 1857)
- Scioglyptis chionomera
- Scioglyptis heterogyna
- Scioglyptis loxographa
- Scioglyptis lyciaria
- Scioglyptis violescens
