= Sphagnodela =

Scientific classification
- Kingdom: Animalia
- Phylum: Arthropoda
- Clade: Pancrustacea
- Class: Insecta
- Order: Lepidoptera
- Family: Geometridae
- Genus: Sphagnodela; Warren, 1893

Type species
- Sphagnodela lucida Warren, 1893

Genus of moths

Sphagnodela is a genus of moths in the family Geometridae erected by Warren in 1893.
