= Sardocyrnia =

Scientific classification
- Kingdom: Animalia
- Phylum: Arthropoda
- Clade: Pancrustacea
- Class: Insecta
- Order: Lepidoptera
- Family: Geometridae
- Genus: Sardocyrnia; Wehrli, 1943

Genus of moths

Sardocyrnia is a genus of moths in the family Geometridae. The genus was described by Wehrli in 1943.

== Species ==
- Sardocyrnia bastelicaria (Bellier, 1862) Spain
- Sardocyrnia fortunaria Vázquez-G, 1905 Sardinia
