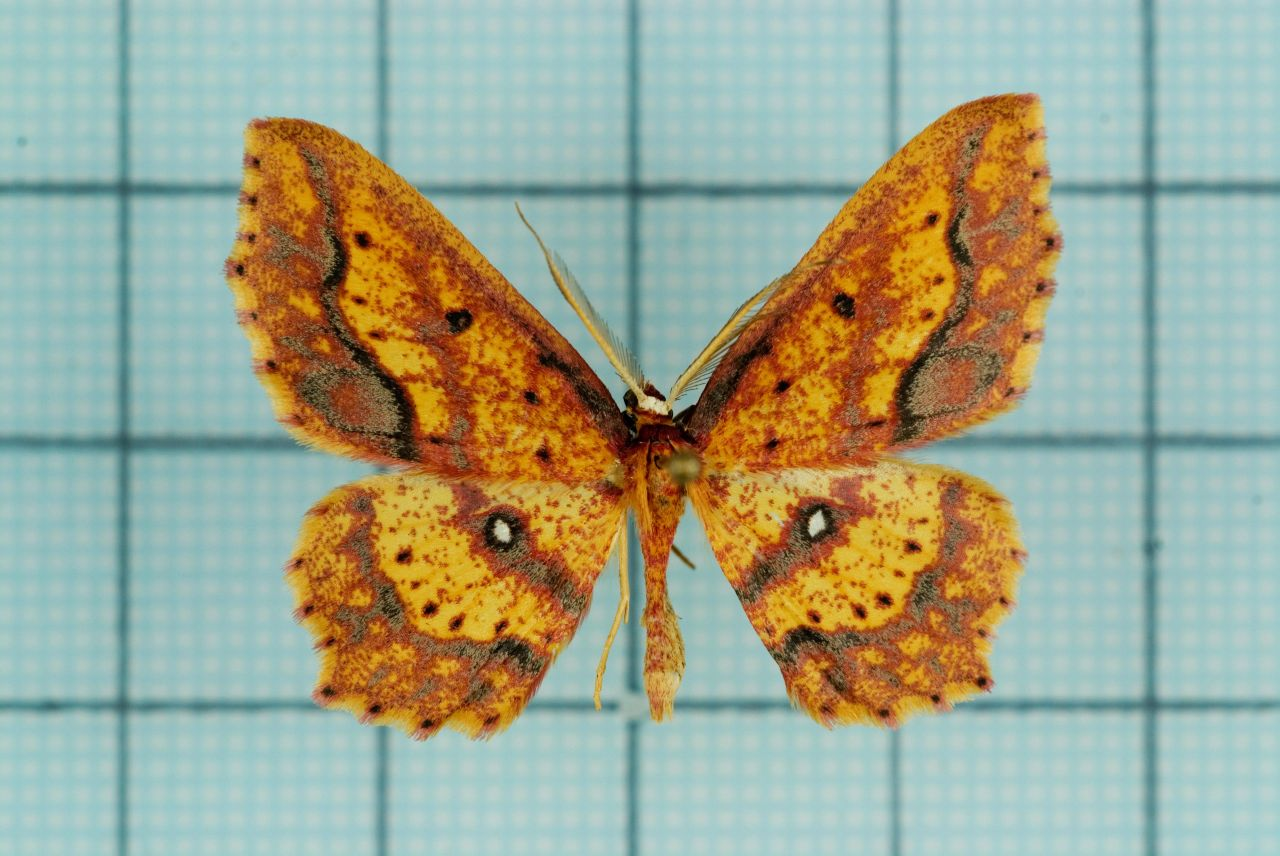
- Synegiodes histrionaria

Scientific classification
- Kingdom: Animalia
- Phylum: Arthropoda
- Class: Insecta
- Order: Lepidoptera
- Family: Geometridae
- Subfamily: Sterrhinae
- Genus: Synegiodes; Swinhoe, 1892

= Synegiodes =

Genus of moths

Synegiodes is a genus of moths in the family Geometridae.

== Species ==
- Synegiodes brunnearia (Leech, 1897)
- Synegiodes diffusifascia Swinhoe, 1892
- Synegiodes histrionaria Swinhoe, 1892
- Synegiodes hyriaria (Walker, 1866)
- Synegiodes obliquifascia Prout, 1918
- Synegiodes punicearia Xue, 1992
- Synegiodes sanguinaria (Moore, 1868)
