= Stibarostoma =

Scientific classification
- Kingdom: Animalia
- Phylum: Arthropoda
- Class: Insecta
- Order: Lepidoptera
- Family: Geometridae
- Subfamily: Sterrhinae
- Genus: Stibarostoma

Genus of moths

Stibarostoma was a genus of moths in the family Geometridae. It is now considered a synonym of Anisodes.
