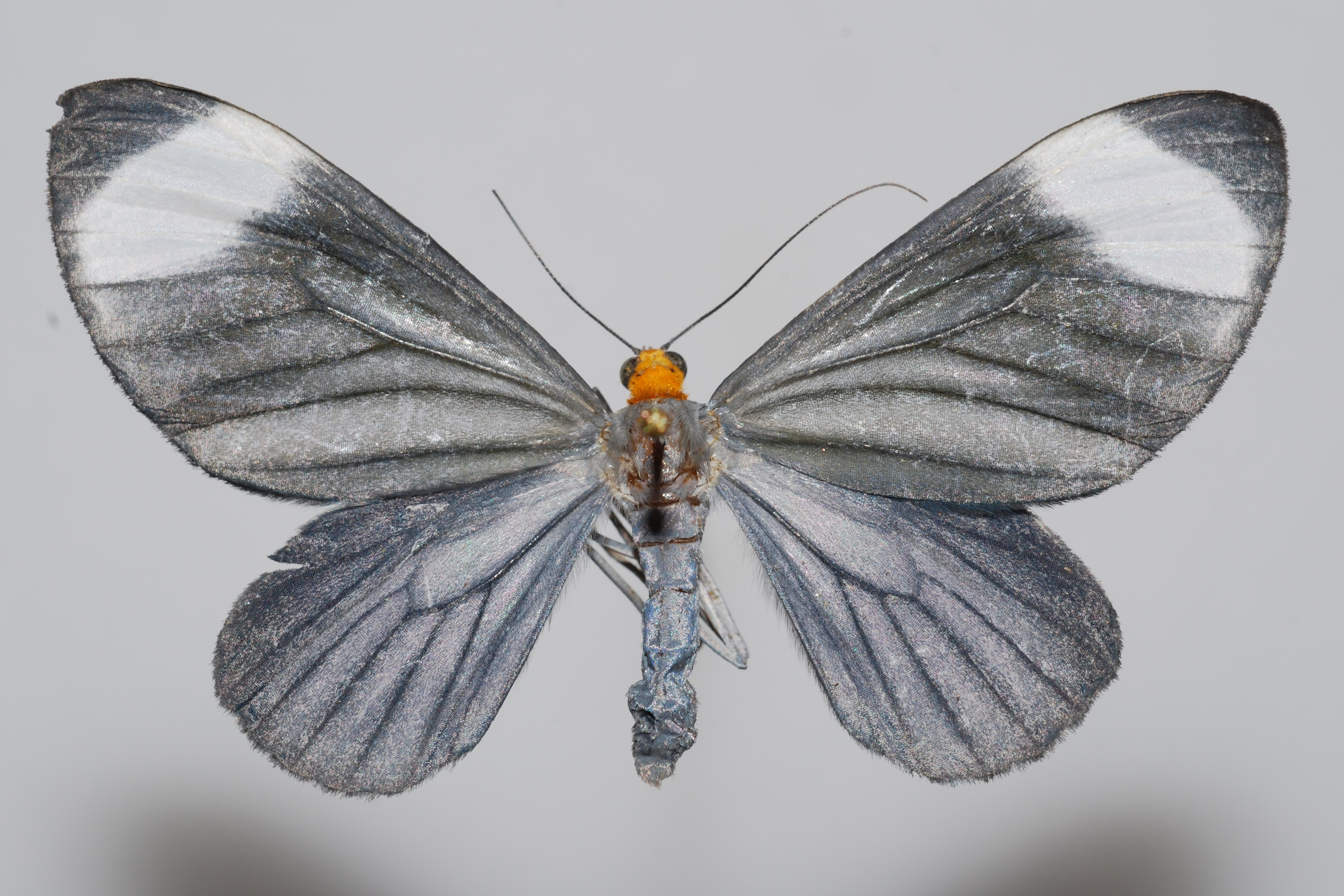
- Simena luctifera female

Scientific classification
- Kingdom: Animalia
- Phylum: Arthropoda
- Class: Insecta
- Order: Lepidoptera
- Family: Geometridae
- Genus: Simena

= Simena (moth) =

Genus of moths

Simena is a genus of moth in the family Geometridae.
