= Satoblephara =

Scientific classification
- Kingdom: Animalia
- Phylum: Arthropoda
- Clade: Pancrustacea
- Class: Insecta
- Order: Lepidoptera
- Family: Geometridae
- Tribe: Boarmiini
- Genus: Satoblephara; Holloway, 1994

Genus of moths

Satoblephara is a genus of moths in the family Geometridae.

== Species ==
- Satoblephara faircloughi Holloway, 1994
- Satoblephara hollowayi (Sato, 1990)
- Satoblephara karsholti (Sato, 1990)
- Satoblephara luzonensis (Sato, 1990)
- Satoblephara nepalensis (Sato, 1993)
- Satoblephara owadai (Inoue, 1978)
- Satoblephara parvalaria (Leech, 1891)
