= Synclysmus =

Scientific classification
- Kingdom: Animalia
- Phylum: Arthropoda
- Class: Insecta
- Order: Lepidoptera
- Family: Geometridae
- Subfamily: Geometrinae
- Genus: Synclysmus; Butler, 1879

Type species
- Synclysmus niveus Butler, 1879

Genus of moths

Synclysmus is a genus of moths in the family Geometridae erected by Arthur Gardiner Butler in 1879.

== Species ==
- Synclysmus grisescens Viette, 1971
- Synclysmus niger Viette, 1971
- Synclysmus nigrocristatus Prout, 1918
- Synclysmus niveus Butler, 1879
- Synclysmus opulentus Herbulot, 1965
