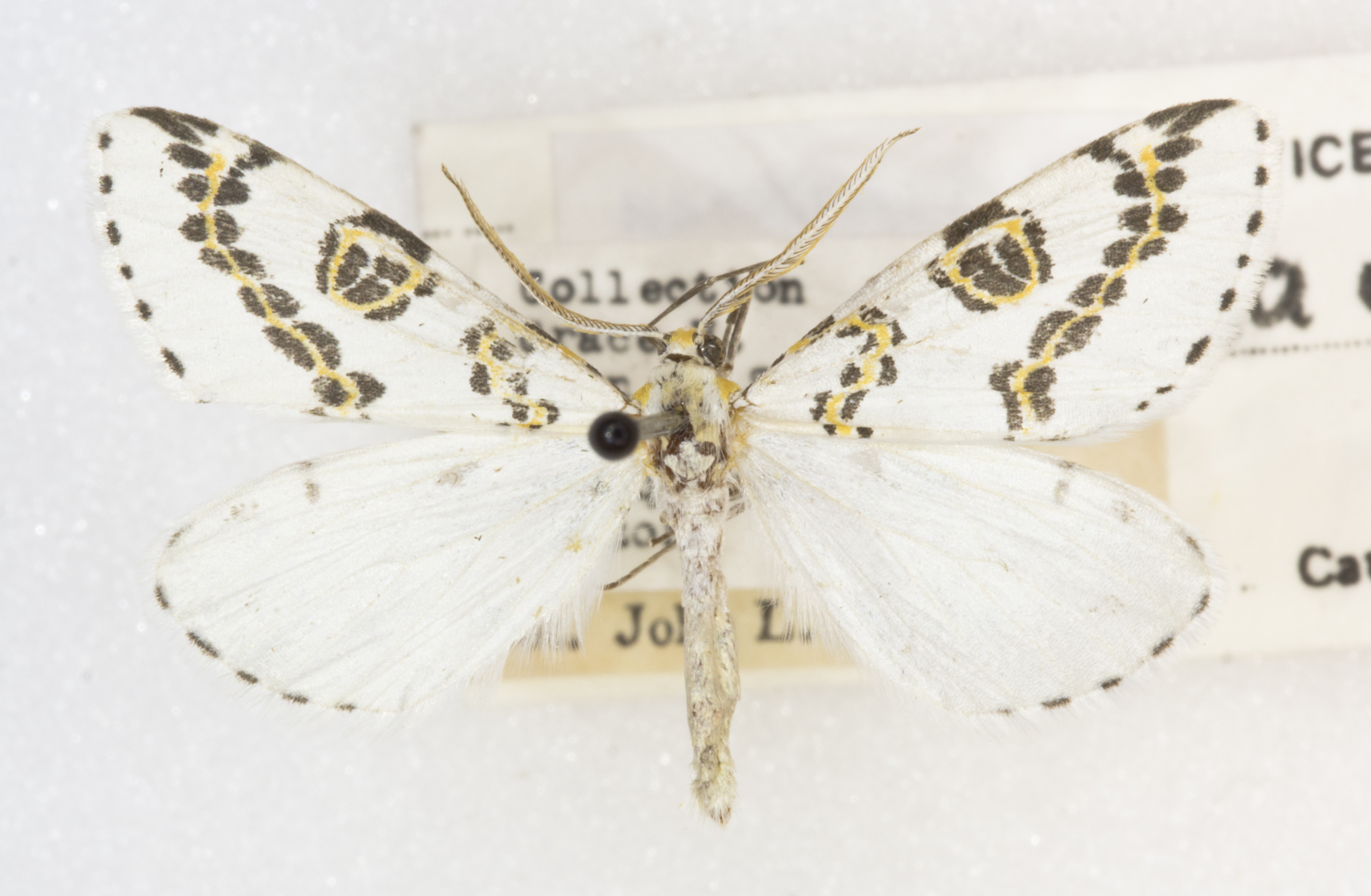

Scientific classification
- Domain: Eukaryota
- Kingdom: Animalia
- Phylum: Arthropoda
- Class: Insecta
- Order: Lepidoptera
- Family: Geometridae
- Tribe: Ourapterygini
- Genus: Philtraea
- Species: P. elegantaria

Binomial name
- Philtraea elegantaria (H. Edwards, 1881)

= Philtraea elegantaria =

Species of moth

Philtraea elegantaria is a species of geometrid moth in the family Geometridae. It is found in North America.

The MONA or Hodges number for Philtraea elegantaria is 6845.

== Subspecies ==
These two subspecies belong to the species Philtraea elegantaria:

- Philtraea elegantaria elegantaria
- Philtraea elegantaria paucimacula Barnes & McDunnough
