= Philtraea utahensis =

Scientific classification
- Domain: Eukaryota
- Kingdom: Animalia
- Phylum: Arthropoda
- Class: Insecta
- Order: Lepidoptera
- Family: Geometridae
- Tribe: Ourapterygini
- Genus: Philtraea
- Species: P. utahensis

Binomial name
- Philtraea utahensis Buckett, 1971

Species of moth

Philtraea utahensis is a species of geometrid moth in the family Geometridae. It is found in North America.

The MONA or Hodges number for Philtraea utahensis is 6846.
