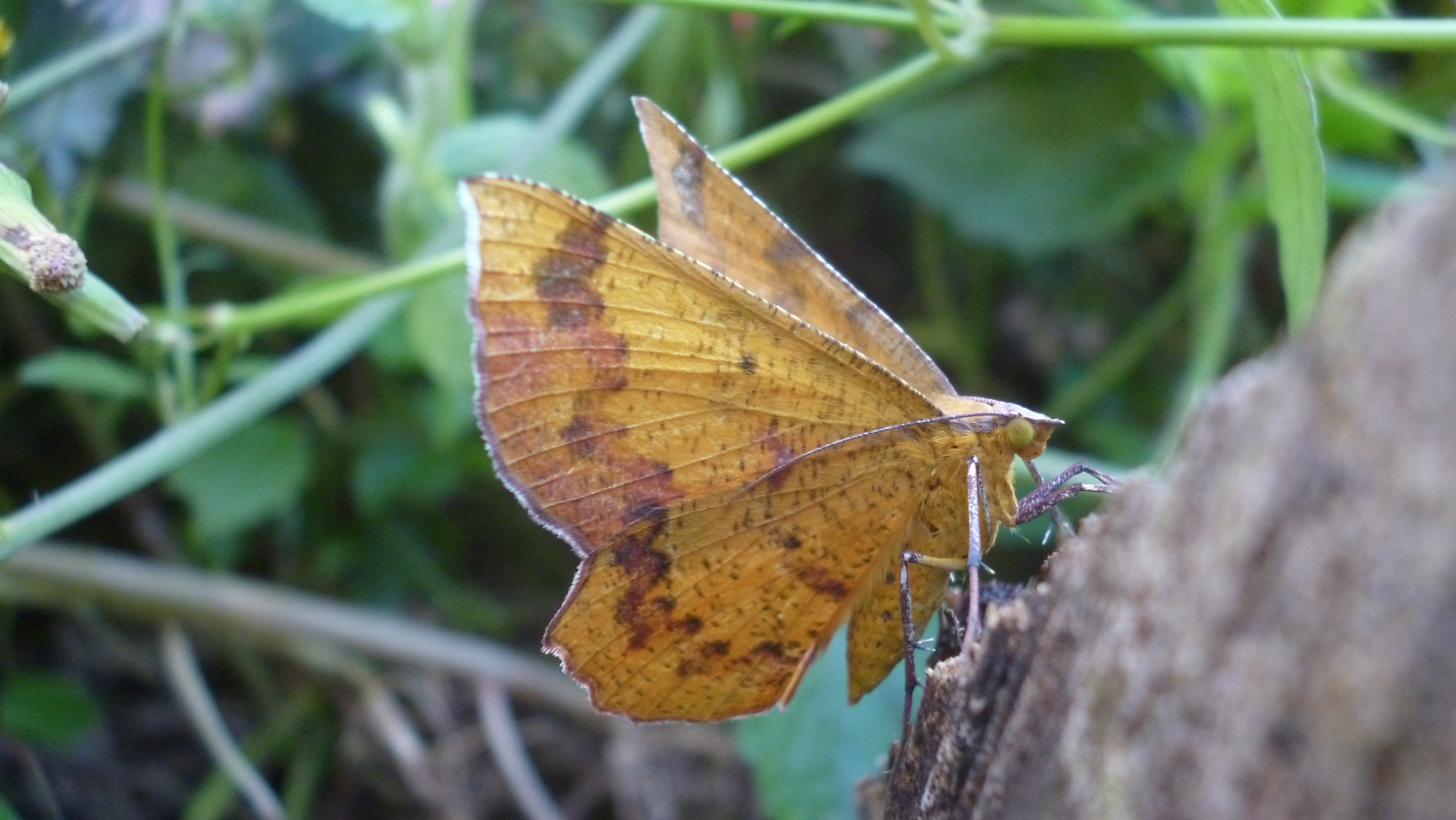

Scientific classification
- Domain: Eukaryota
- Kingdom: Animalia
- Phylum: Arthropoda
- Class: Insecta
- Order: Lepidoptera
- Family: Geometridae
- Tribe: Ourapterygini
- Genus: Melemaea
- Species: M. magdalena

Binomial name
- Melemaea magdalena Hulst, 1896

= Melemaea magdalena =

Species of moth

Melemaea magdalena is a species of geometrid moth in the family Geometridae. It is found in North America.

The MONA or Hodges number for Melemaea magdalena is 6855.
