= Melemaea virgata =

Scientific classification
- Kingdom: Animalia
- Phylum: Arthropoda
- Clade: Pancrustacea
- Class: Insecta
- Order: Lepidoptera
- Family: Geometridae
- Tribe: Ourapterygini
- Genus: Melemaea
- Species: M. virgata

Binomial name
- Melemaea virgata Taylor, 1906

Species of moth

Melemaea virgata is a species of geometrid moth in the family Geometridae. It is found in North America.
