= Eriplatymetra coloradaria =

Scientific classification
- Kingdom: Animalia
- Phylum: Arthropoda
- Class: Insecta
- Order: Lepidoptera
- Family: Geometridae
- Tribe: Ourapterygini
- Genus: Eriplatymetra
- Species: E. coloradaria

Binomial name
- Eriplatymetra coloradaria (Grote & Robinson, 1867)

Synonyms
- Ennomos coloradaria Grote and Robinson, 1867

Species of moth

Eriplatymetra coloradaria is a species of geometrid moth in the family Geometridae. It is found in North America.

The MONA or Hodges number for Eriplatymetra coloradaria is 6852.
