= Eucaterva bonniwelli =

Scientific classification
- Kingdom: Animalia
- Phylum: Arthropoda
- Clade: Pancrustacea
- Class: Insecta
- Order: Lepidoptera
- Family: Geometridae
- Tribe: Ourapterygini
- Genus: Eucaterva
- Species: E. bonniwelli

Binomial name
- Eucaterva bonniwelli Cassino & Swett, 1922

Species of moth

Eucaterva bonniwelli is a species of geometrid moth in the family Geometridae. It is found in North America.
