= Somatolophia pallescens =

Scientific classification
- Domain: Eukaryota
- Kingdom: Animalia
- Phylum: Arthropoda
- Class: Insecta
- Order: Lepidoptera
- Family: Geometridae
- Tribe: Ourapterygini
- Genus: Somatolophia
- Species: S. pallescens

Binomial name
- Somatolophia pallescens McDunnough, 1940

Species of moth

Somatolophia pallescens is a species of geometrid moth in the family Geometridae. It is found in North America.

The MONA or Hodges number for Somatolophia pallescens is 6946.
