= Meris paradoxa =

Scientific classification
- Domain: Eukaryota
- Kingdom: Animalia
- Phylum: Arthropoda
- Class: Insecta
- Order: Lepidoptera
- Family: Geometridae
- Tribe: Ourapterygini
- Genus: Meris
- Species: M. paradoxa

Binomial name
- Meris paradoxa Rindge, 1981

Species of moth

Meris paradoxa is a species of geometrid moth in the family Geometridae. It is found in North America.

The MONA or Hodges number for Meris paradoxa is 6877.
