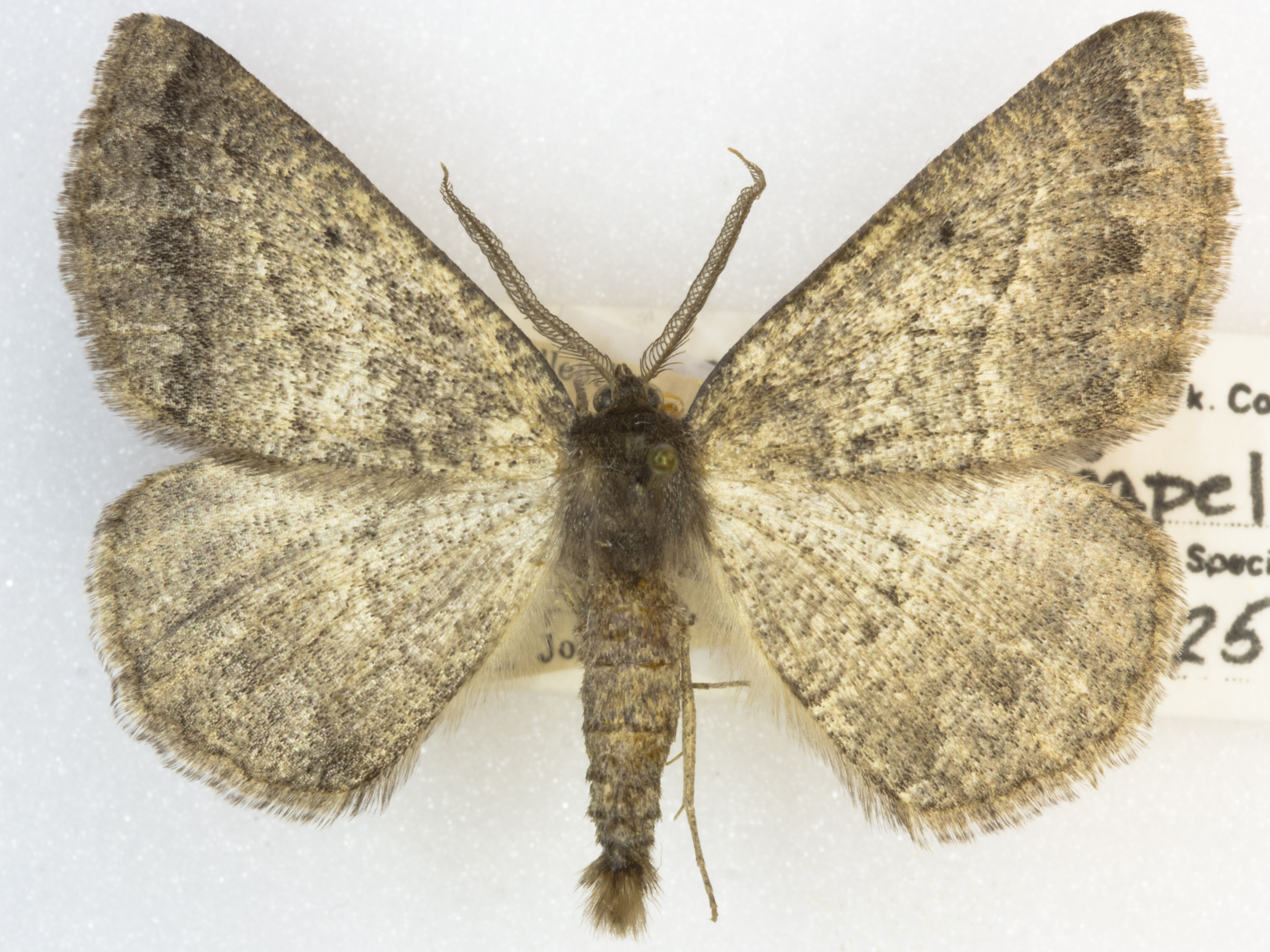

Scientific classification
- Kingdom: Animalia
- Phylum: Arthropoda
- Clade: Pancrustacea
- Class: Insecta
- Order: Lepidoptera
- Family: Geometridae
- Tribe: Ourapterygini
- Genus: Somatolophia
- Species: S. ectrapelaria

Binomial name
- Somatolophia ectrapelaria (Grossbeck, 1908)

= Somatolophia ectrapelaria =

Species of moth

Somatolophia ectrapelaria is a species of geometrid moth in the family Geometridae. It is found in North America.
