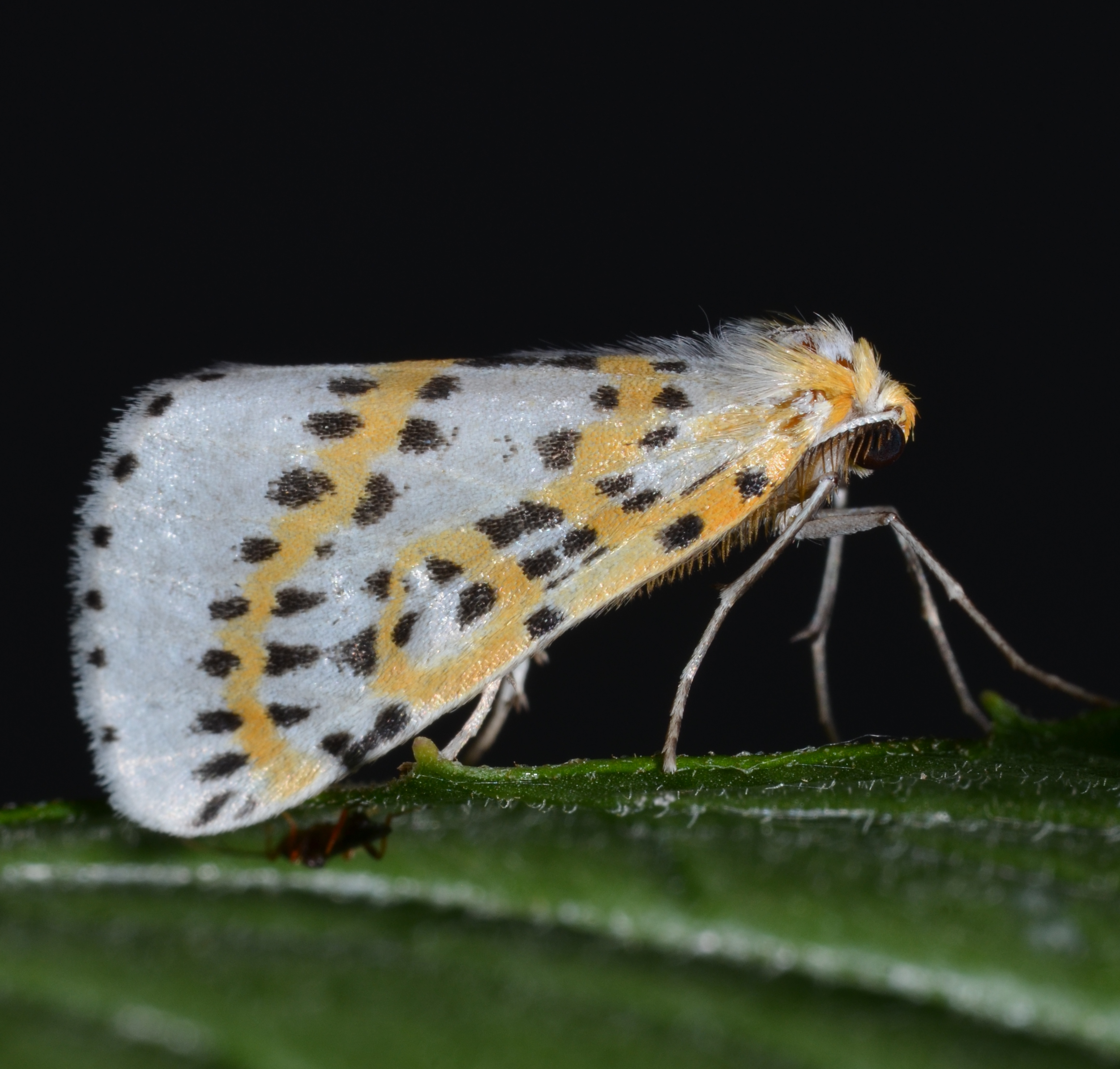

Scientific classification
- Domain: Eukaryota
- Kingdom: Animalia
- Phylum: Arthropoda
- Class: Insecta
- Order: Lepidoptera
- Family: Geometridae
- Genus: Philtraea
- Species: P. monillata

Binomial name
- Philtraea monillata Buckett, 1971

= Philtraea monillata =

Species of moth

Philtraea monillata is a moth in the family Geometridae. It is found in North America, where it has been recorded from the southern United States in drainage basin of the Mississippi River from Missouri and Kentucky south to Louisiana.

The wingspan is 10–16 mm. Adults are on wing from early June to late August in two generations per year.
