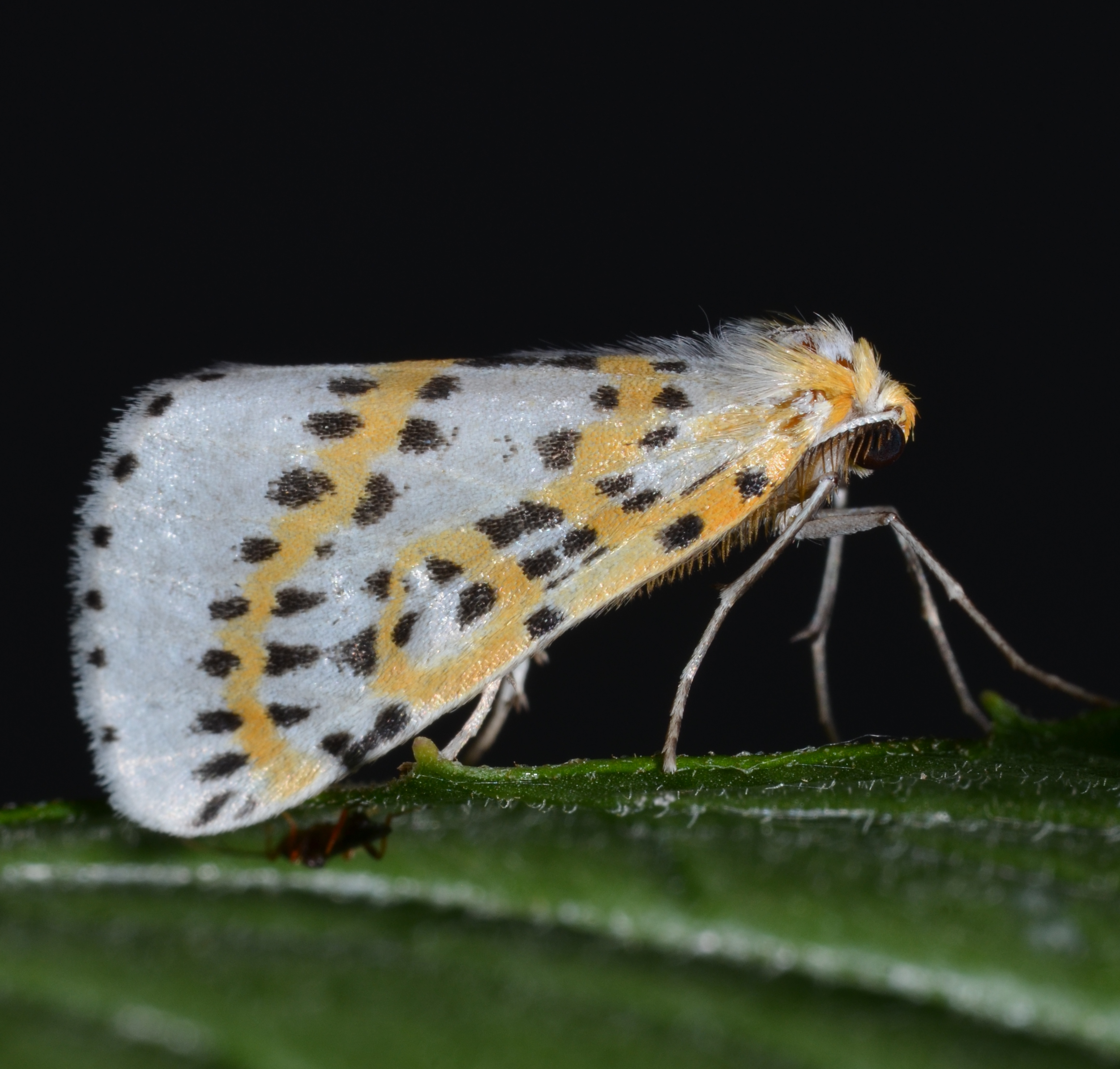
- Philtraea monillata

Scientific classification
- Domain: Eukaryota
- Kingdom: Animalia
- Phylum: Arthropoda
- Class: Insecta
- Order: Lepidoptera
- Family: Geometridae
- Tribe: Ourapterygini
- Genus: Philtraea; Hulst, 1896

= Philtraea =

Genus of moths

Philtraea is a genus of moths in the family Geometridae.

== Species ==
- Philtraea albimaxima Buckett, 1971
- Philtraea elegantaria (Edwards, 1881)
- Philtraea latifoliae Buckett, 1971
- Philtraea mexicana Buckett, 1971
- Philtraea monillata Buckett, 1971
- Philtraea paucimacula Barnes & McDunnough, 1918
- Philtraea surcaliforniae Buckett, 1971
- Philtraea utahensis Buckett, 1971
