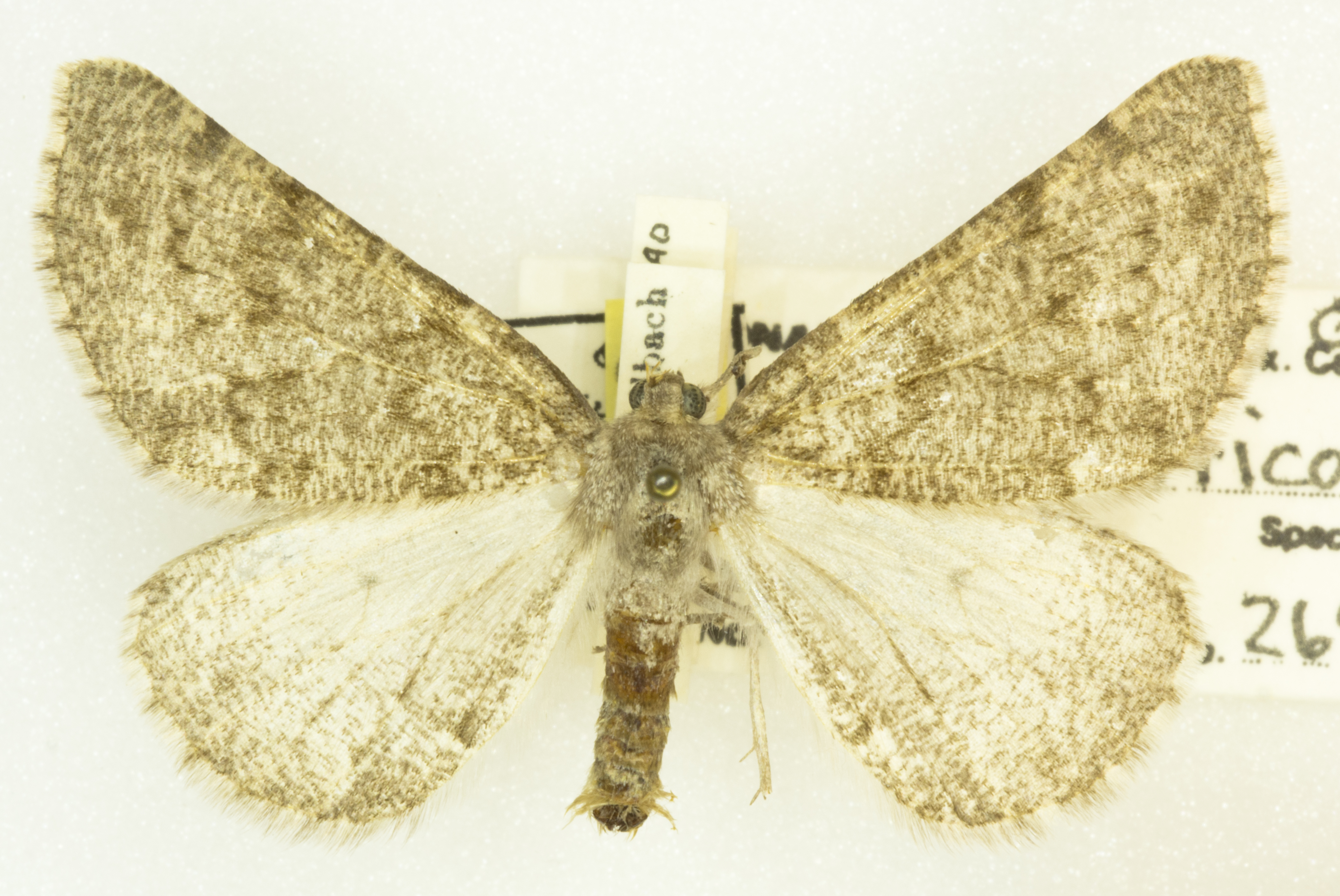

Scientific classification
- Domain: Eukaryota
- Kingdom: Animalia
- Phylum: Arthropoda
- Class: Insecta
- Order: Lepidoptera
- Family: Geometridae
- Genus: Meris
- Species: M. alticola

Binomial name
- Meris alticola Hulst, 1896

= Meris alticola =

Species of moth

Meris alticola is a species of geometrid moth in the family Geometridae. It is found in North America.

The MONA or Hodges number for Meris alticola is 6879.1.
