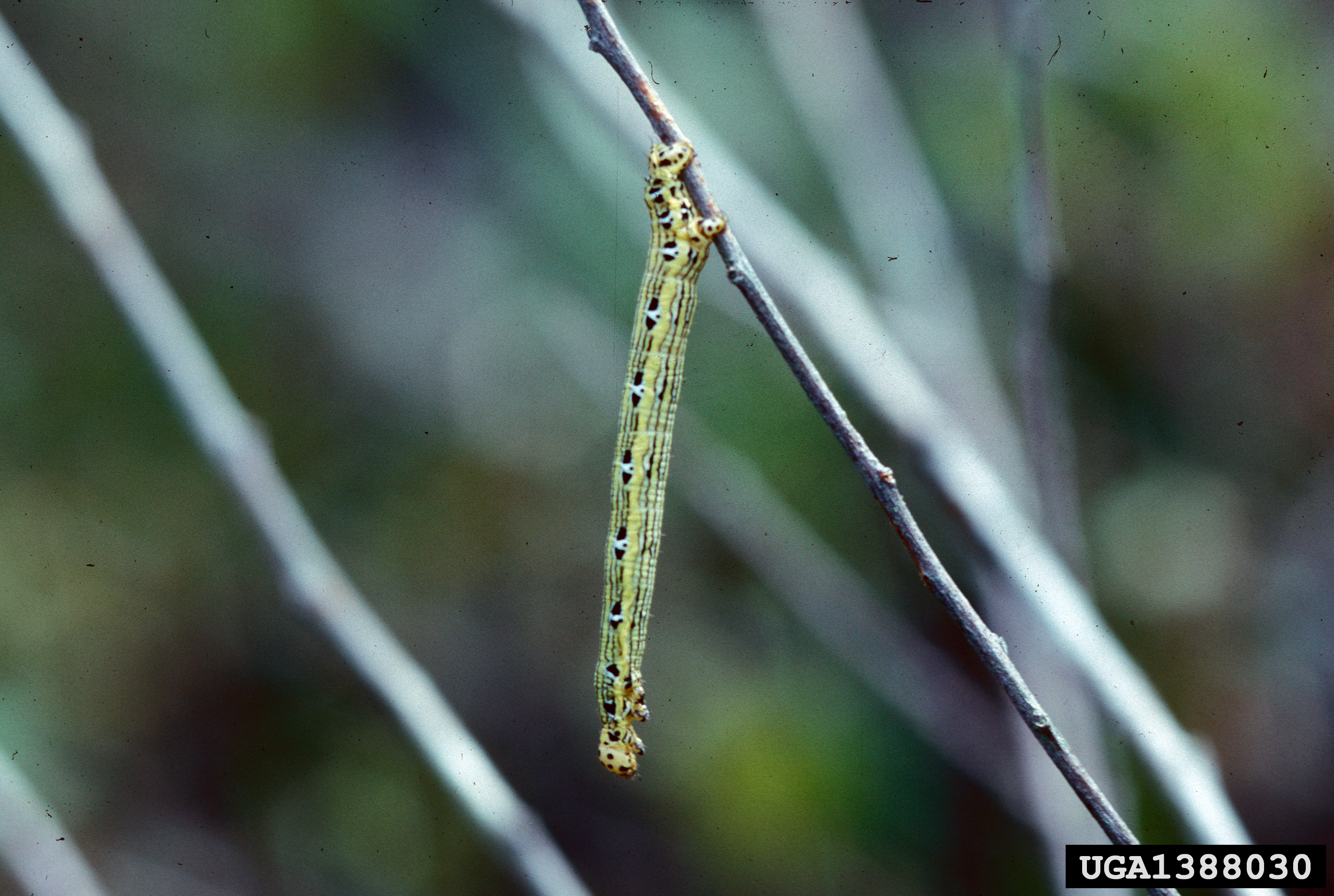

Scientific classification
- Kingdom: Animalia
- Phylum: Arthropoda
- Clade: Pancrustacea
- Class: Insecta
- Order: Lepidoptera
- Family: Geometridae
- Tribe: Ourapterygini
- Genus: Cingilia; Walker, 1862
- Species: C. catenaria

Binomial name
- Cingilia catenaria (Drury, 1773)

Synonyms
- Phalaena catenaria Drury, 1773; Cingilia devinctaria (Guenée, 1857); Cingilia humeralis Walker, 1862; Cingilia rubiferaria Swett, 1910; Cingilia immacularia Swett, 1914

= Cingilia =

Genus of moths

Cingilia is a monotypic genus of moth in the family Geometridae erected by Francis Walker in 1862. Its only species, Cingilia catenaria, the chain-dotted geometer, chain dot geometer, chainspotted geometer or chain-spotted geometer, was first described by Dru Drury in 1773. It is found in North America from Nova Scotia south to Maryland and west to Kansas and Alberta.

The wingspan is 30–40 mm. Adults are on wing from late August to early October in one generation per year. Larvae are found from June to August. The species overwinters as an egg.
