= Agaraeus =

Scientific classification
- Kingdom: Animalia
- Phylum: Arthropoda
- Class: Insecta
- Order: Lepidoptera
- Family: Geometridae
- Tribe: Ourapterygini
- Genus: Agaraeus; Kuznetzov & Stekolnikov, 1982

Synonyms
- Hyperapeira Inoue, 1982

Genus of geometer moths

Agaraeus is a genus of moths in the family Geometridae.

== Species ==
Scoble's 2023 catalogue of Geometridae lists the following species and subspecies for genus Agaraeus:

- Agaraeus discolor (Warren, 1893)
- Agaraeus luteus (Wileman, 1910)
- Agaraeus parva (Hedemann, 1881) - Russia (Primorsky Krai), China, Japan
  - Agaraeus parva distans (Warren, 1895)
