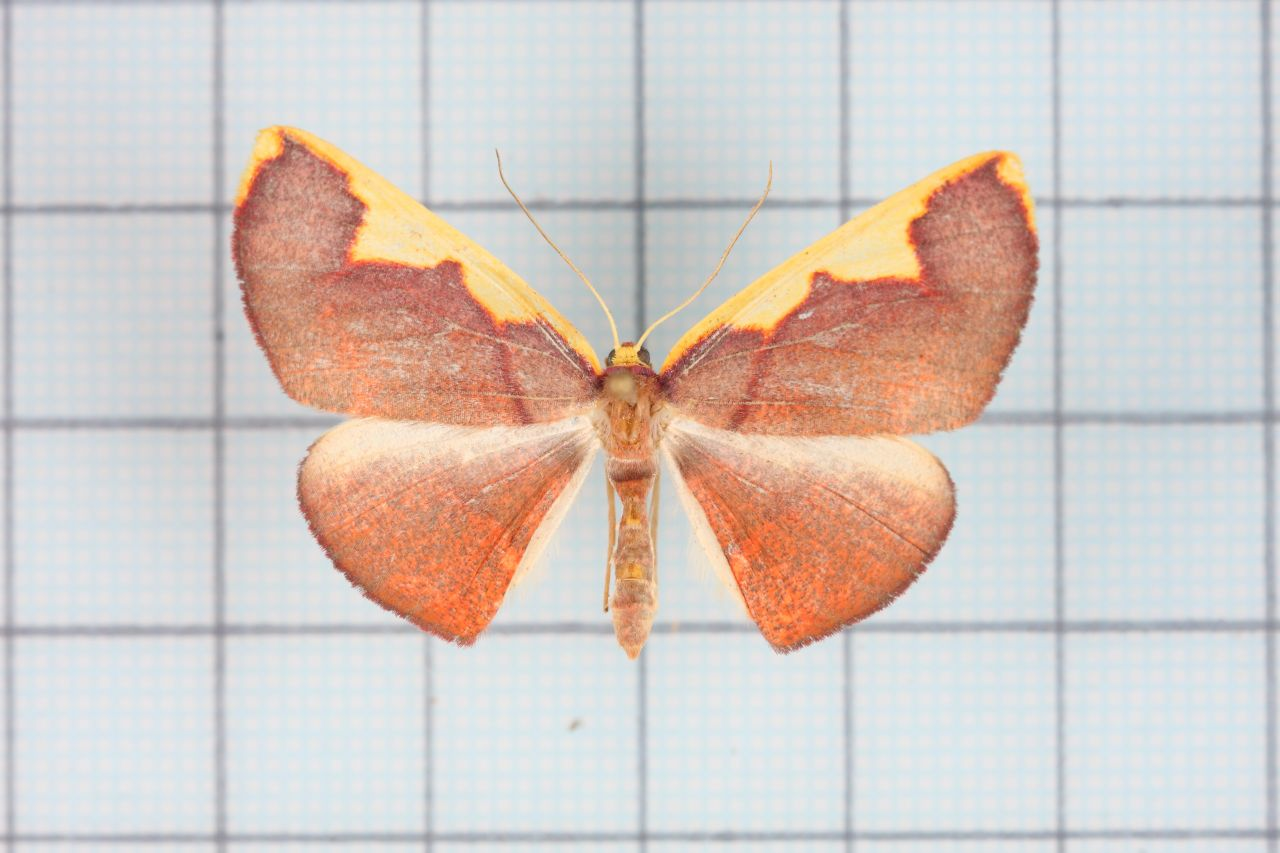

Scientific classification
- Kingdom: Animalia
- Phylum: Arthropoda
- Clade: Pancrustacea
- Class: Insecta
- Order: Lepidoptera
- Family: Geometridae
- Genus: Nothomiza
- Species: N. flavicosta

Binomial name
- Nothomiza flavicosta Prout, 1914

= Nothomiza flavicosta =

Species of moth

Nothomiza flavicosta is a species of moth belonging to the family Geometridae, commonly known as geometer moths. This species is endemic to Taiwan, located in East Asia.
