= Philtraea paucimacula =

Scientific classification
- Kingdom: Animalia
- Phylum: Arthropoda
- Class: Insecta
- Order: Lepidoptera
- Family: Geometridae
- Genus: Philtraea
- Species: P. paucimacula

Binomial name
- Philtraea paucimacula Barnes & McDunnough, 1918

Species of moth

Philtraea paucimacula is a species of moth in the family Geometridae first described by William Barnes and James Halliday McDunnough in 1918. It is found in North America.

The MONA or Hodges number for Philtraea paucimacula is 6850.
