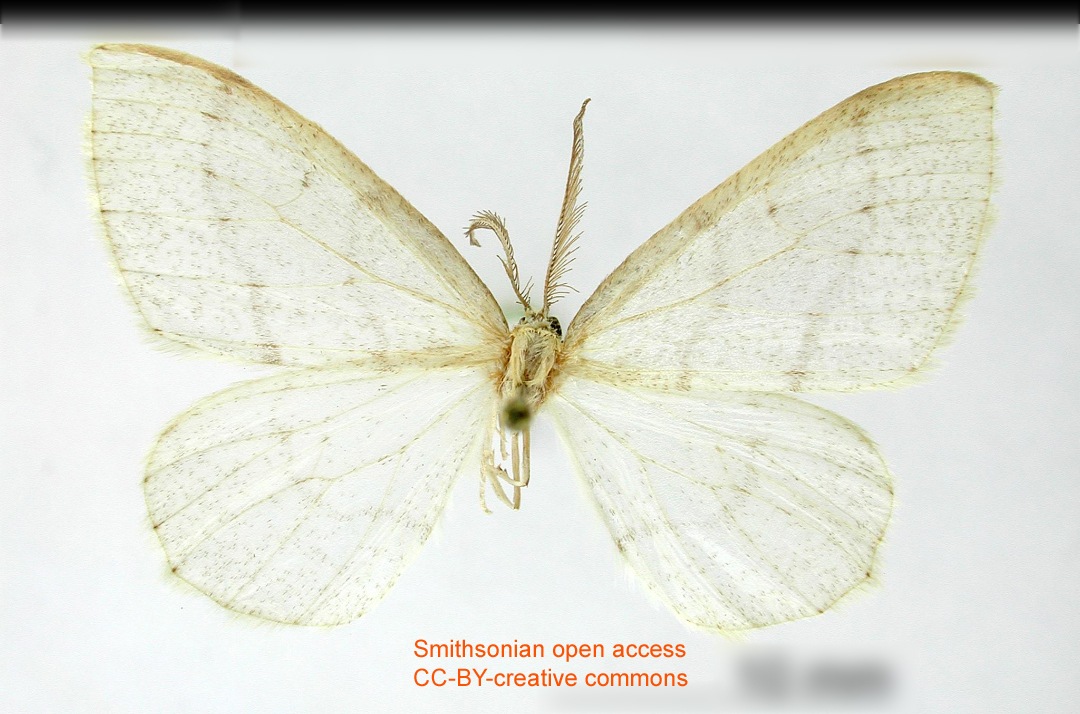

Scientific classification
- Kingdom: Animalia
- Phylum: Arthropoda
- Class: Insecta
- Order: Lepidoptera
- Family: Geometridae
- Tribe: Ourapterygini
- Genus: Evita; Capps, 1943
- Species: E. hyalinaria

Binomial name
- Evita hyalinaria (Grossbeck, 1908)

Synonyms
- Therina blandaria Dyar, 1916

= Evita (moth) =

Genus of moths

Evita is a monotypic moth genus in the family Geometridae described by Hahn William Capps in 1943. Its only species, Evita hyalinaria, was first described by Grossbeck in 1908. It is found in southwestern North America.

The subspecies Evita hyalinaria blandaria was described by Harrison Gray Dyar Jr. as Therina blandaria in 1916.
