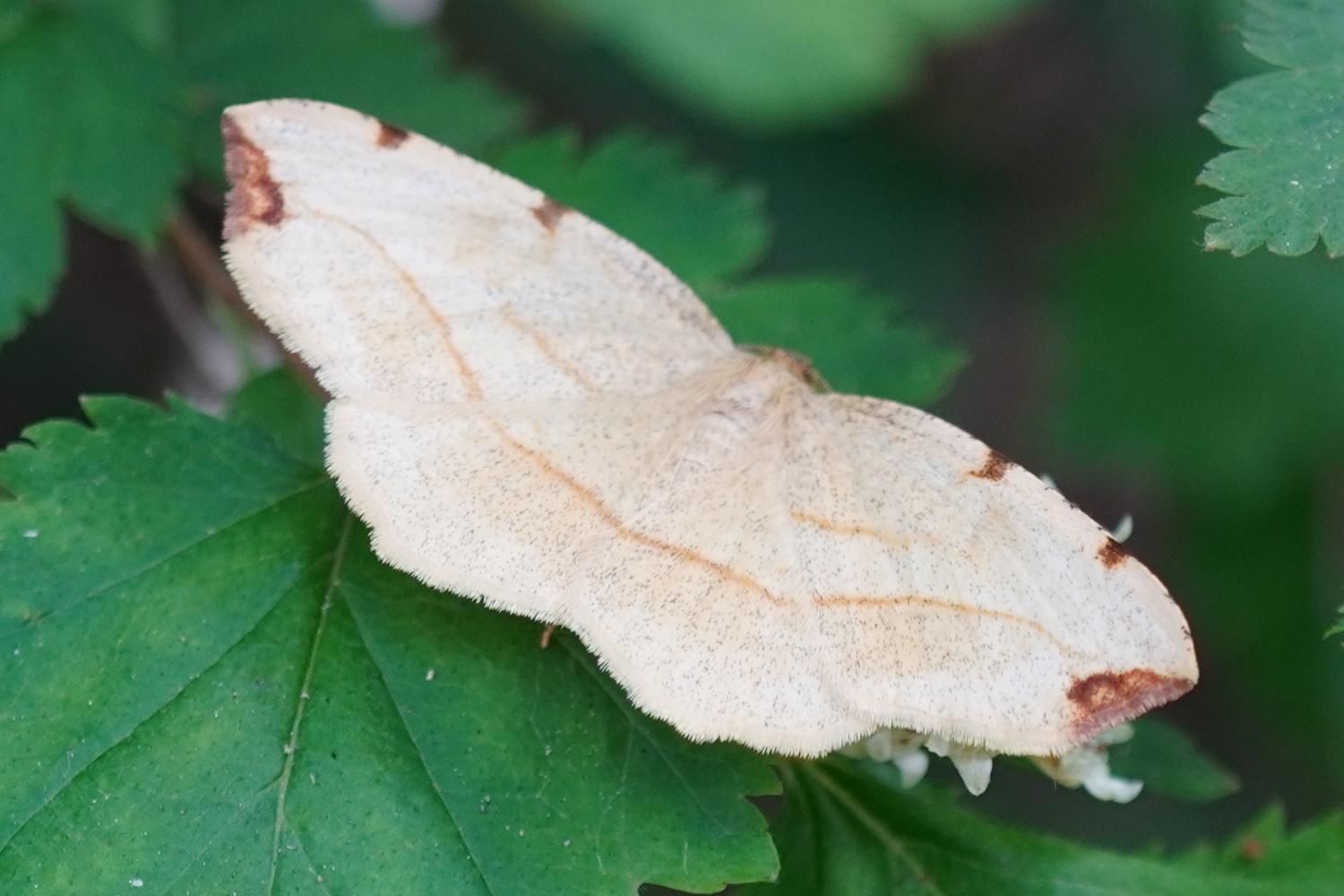
- Spilopera debilis observed in South Korea in 2020

Scientific classification
- Kingdom: Animalia
- Phylum: Arthropoda
- Class: Insecta
- Order: Lepidoptera
- Family: Geometridae
- Tribe: Ourapterygini
- Genus: Spilopera; Warren, 1893

= Spilopera =

Genus of moths

Spilopera is a genus of moths in the family Geometridae.

== Description ==
Palpi porrect (extending forward), hairy and reaching beyond the frons. Antennae of male nearly simple. Forewings with outer margin usually angled at vein 4. Vein 3 from near angle of cell and veins 7 to 9 stalked, from near upper angle. Vein 10 present. Hindwings with outer margin angled at vein 4 and vein 3 from near angle of cell. According to the Global Biodiversity Information Facility, specimens of the genus have mostly been observed in Japan, Taiwan, China, Korea, and the Indochinese Peninsula. And also spilopera is a genus of Lepidoptera in the family geometrid moths.

== Species ==
- Spilopera anomala (Warren, 1893)
- Spilopera chosenibia (Bryk, 1948)
- Spilopera chui (Stüning, 1987)
- Spilopera crenularia (Leech, 1897)
- Spilopera debilis (Butler, 1878)
- Spilopera divaricata (Moore, 1888)
- Spilopera gracilis (Butler, 1879)
- Spilopera gracilis (Hampson, 1895)
- Spilopera lepta (Wehrli, 1940)
- Spilopera polishana (Matsumura, 1931)
- Spilopera roseimarginata (Leech, 1897)
