= Campatonema marginata =

Scientific classification
- Domain: Eukaryota
- Kingdom: Animalia
- Phylum: Arthropoda
- Class: Insecta
- Order: Lepidoptera
- Family: Geometridae
- Genus: Campatonema
- Species: C. marginata

Binomial name
- Campatonema marginata E. D. Jones, 1921

Species of moth

Campatonema marginata is a moth of the family Geometridae first described by E. Dukinfield Jones in 1921. Found in Brazil, it is the type species of the genus Campatonema and was long thought to be the only member. Recently, however, two newly described species were added and one species was relocated to the genus.
