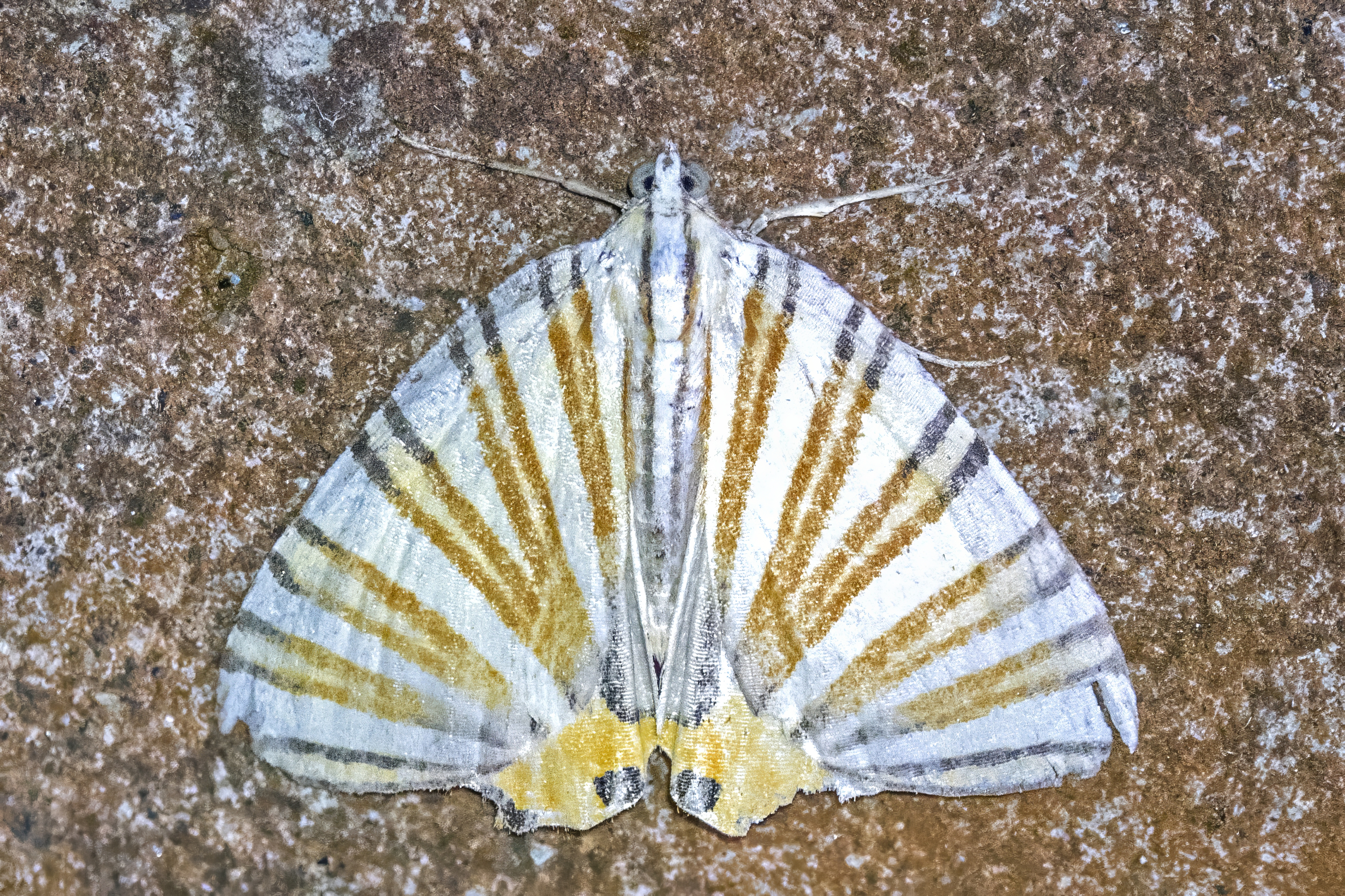
- In Ecuador

Scientific classification
- Kingdom: Animalia
- Phylum: Arthropoda
- Class: Insecta
- Order: Lepidoptera
- Family: Geometridae
- Genus: Pityeja
- Species: P. histrionaria

Binomial name
- Pityeja histrionaria (Herrich-Schäffer, 1853)

Synonyms
- Geometra histrionaria Herrich-Schäffer, [1853]

= Pityeja histrionaria =

Species of moth

Pityeja histrionaria is a moth of the family Geometridae first described by Gottlieb August Wilhelm Herrich-Schäffer in 1853. It is found in Central and South America, where it has been recorded from Costa Rica, Honduras, Ecuador and Venezuela.

The larvae have been recorded feeding on Myrsine coriacea.
