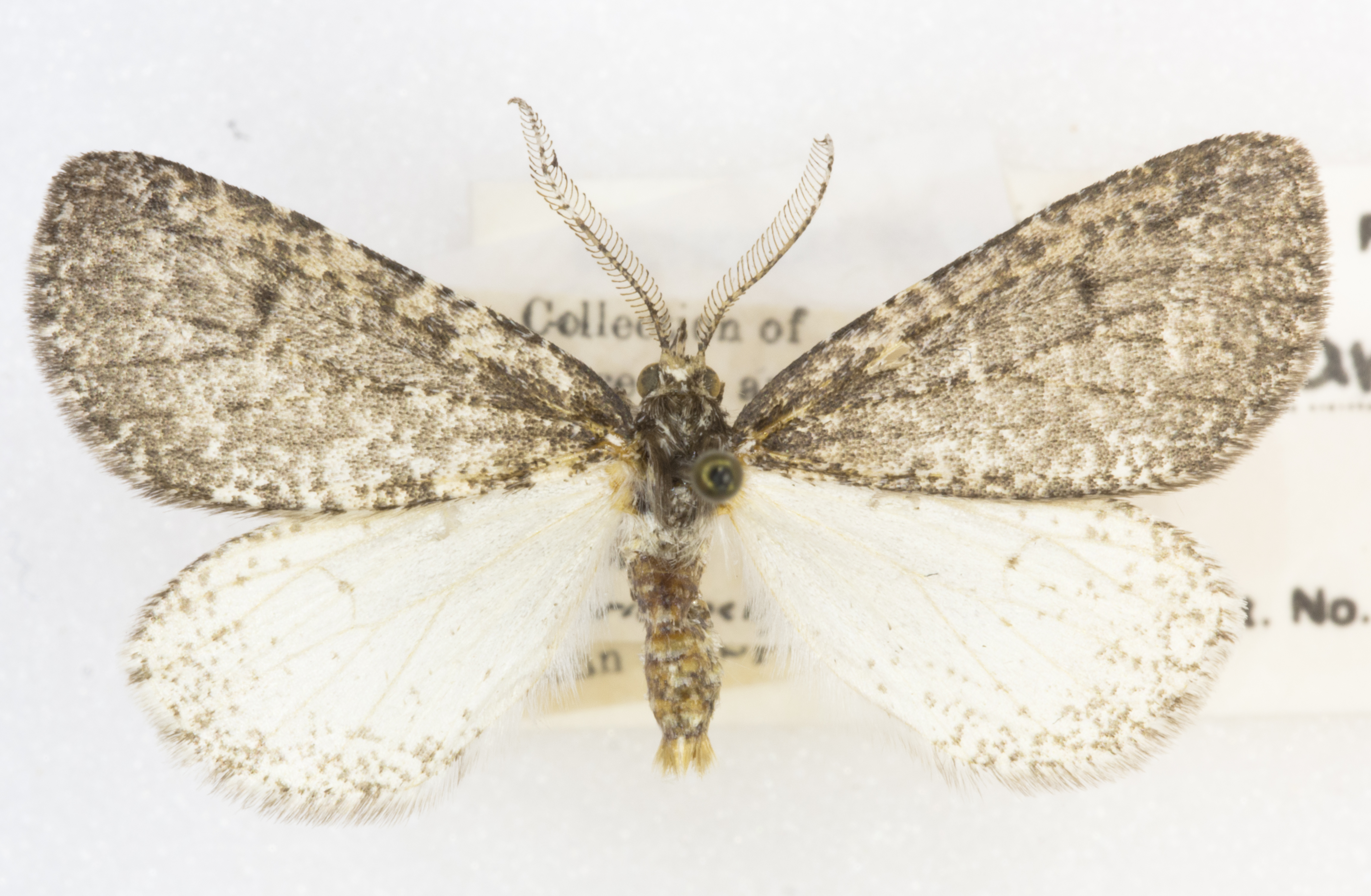

Scientific classification
- Kingdom: Animalia
- Phylum: Arthropoda
- Class: Insecta
- Order: Lepidoptera
- Family: Geometridae
- Genus: Eucaterva
- Species: E. variaria

Binomial name
- Eucaterva variaria Grote, 1882

Synonyms
- Bryoptera lymax Druce, 1898; Eucaterva variaria labesaria Grote, 1882

= Eucaterva variaria =

Species of moth

Eucaterva variaria is a species of geometrid moth in the family Geometridae. It is found in Central America and North America. It feeds on desert willow (Chilopsis).

The MONA or Hodges number for Eucaterva variaria is 6918.
