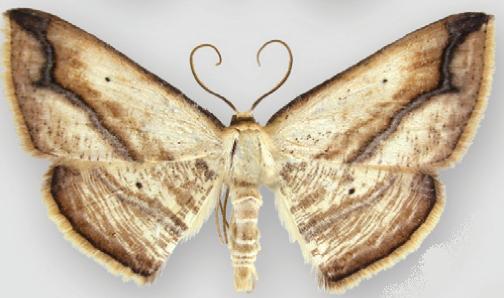
- Male

Scientific classification
- Domain: Eukaryota
- Kingdom: Animalia
- Phylum: Arthropoda
- Class: Insecta
- Order: Lepidoptera
- Family: Geometridae
- Genus: Campatonema
- Species: C. yanayacua

Binomial name
- Campatonema yanayacua Sullivan, 2010

= Campatonema yanayacua =

Species of moth

Campatonema yanayacua is a moth of the family Geometridae first described by Sullivan in 2010. It is known only from the type locality, the Yanayacu Biological Station in Ecuador.

The length of the forewings is 15–17 mm (0.59–0.67 in).

== Etymology ==
It is named after Yanayacu Biological Station, Napo, Ecuador.
