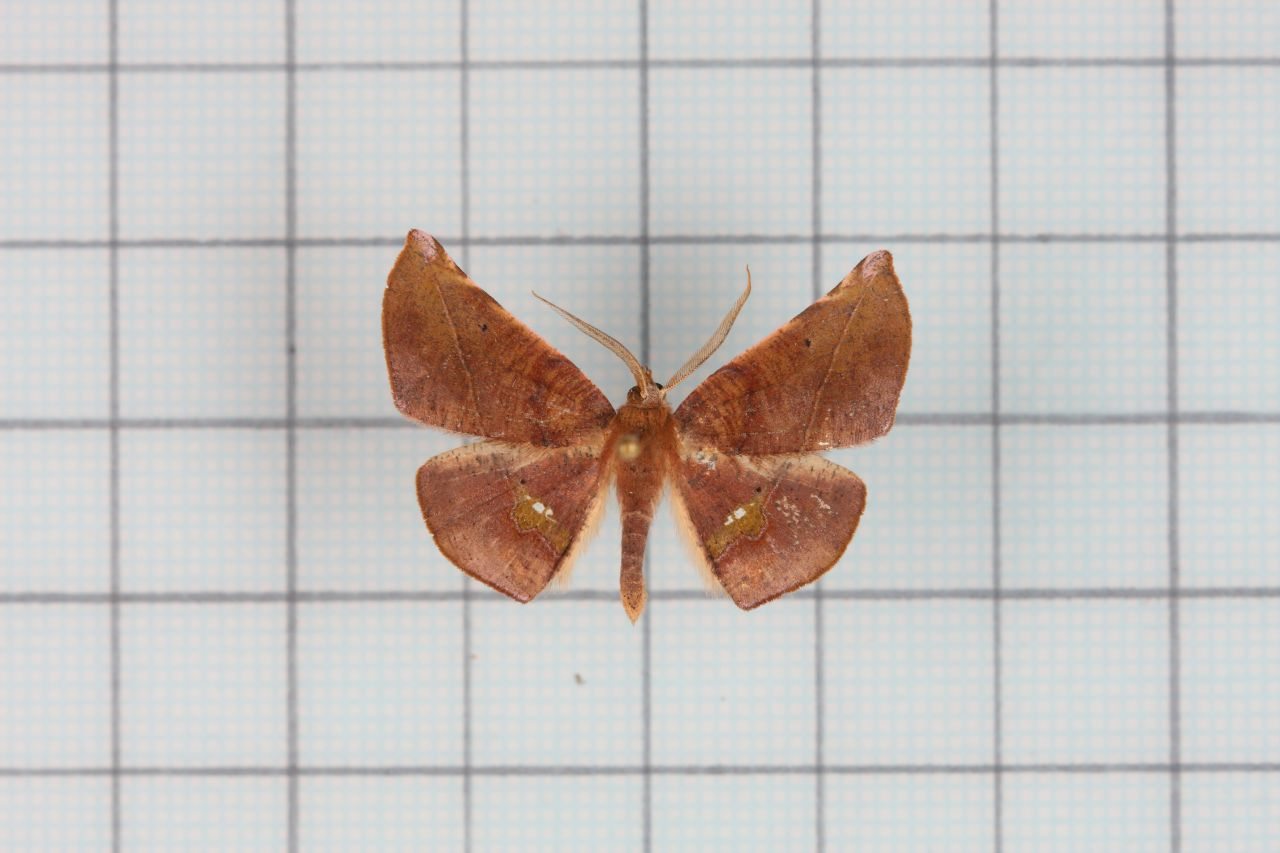
- Garaeus apicata formosanus

Scientific classification
- Kingdom: Animalia
- Phylum: Arthropoda
- Class: Insecta
- Order: Lepidoptera
- Family: Geometridae
- Genus: Garaeus
- Species: G. apicata

Binomial name
- Garaeus apicata (Moore, 1868)

Synonyms
- Auzea apicata Moore, 1868; Garaeus violaria Prout 1922; Agaraeus apicatus formosanus

= Garaeus apicata =

Species of moth

Garaeus apicata is a moth in the family Geometridae. It is found in the north-eastern Himalaya, Burma, Sumatra, Borneo and Taiwan.

The larvae have been recorded feeding on Gmelina arborea. They are brown.

== Subspecies ==
- Garaeus apicata apicata
- Garaeus apicata formosanus Bastelberger, 1911 (Taiwan)
