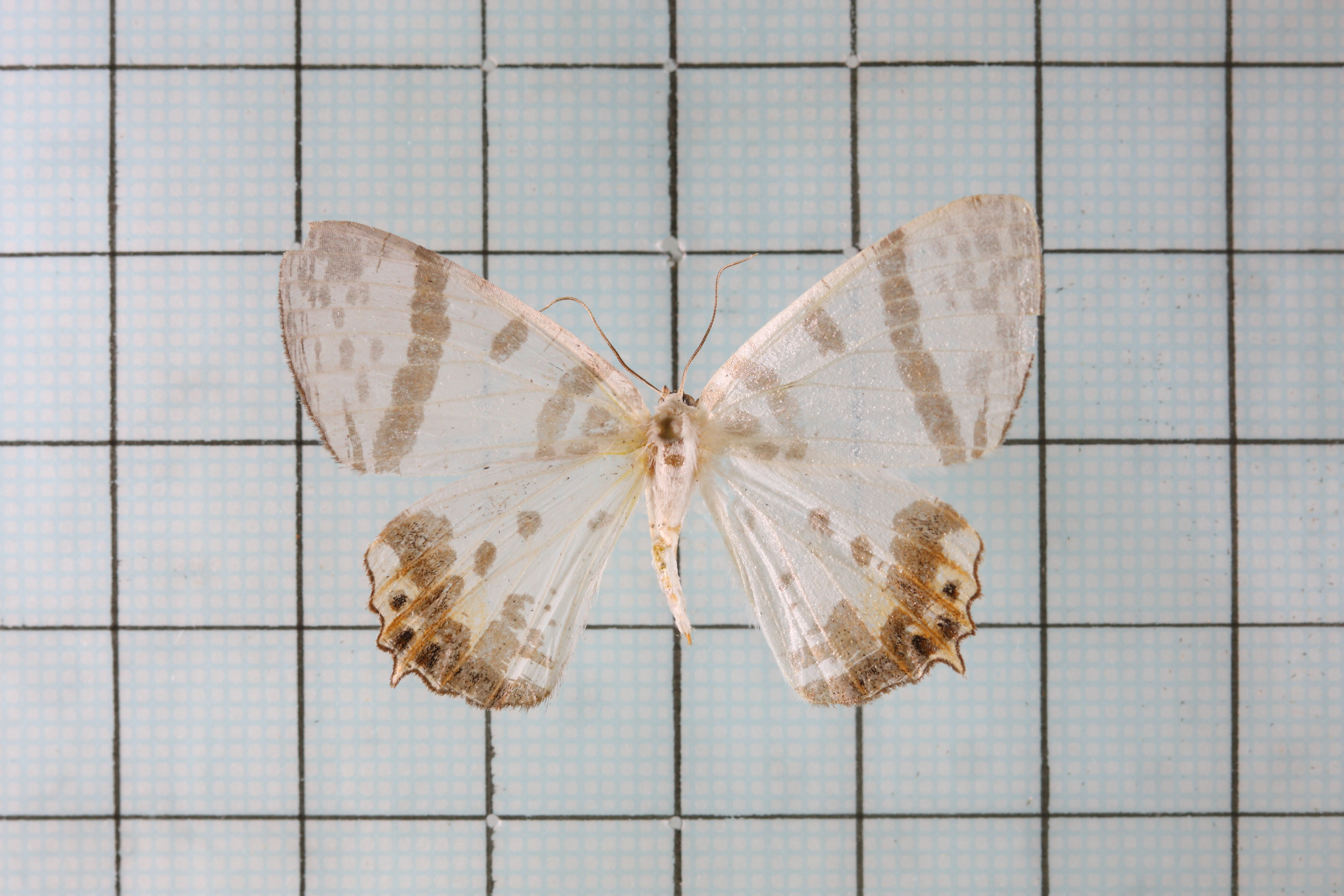

Scientific classification
- Kingdom: Animalia
- Phylum: Arthropoda
- Class: Insecta
- Order: Lepidoptera
- Family: Geometridae
- Genus: Tristrophis
- Species: T. rectifascia

Binomial name
- Tristrophis rectifascia (Wileman, 1912)

Synonyms
- Vindusara rectifascia Wileman, 1912; Ourapteryx asymetricaria Oberthur, 1923; Tristrophis opisthommata Wehrli, 1923

= Tristrophis rectifascia =

Species of moth

Tristrophis rectifascia is a species of moth of the family Geometridae first described by Alfred Ernest Wileman in 1912. It is found in Taiwan.

== Subspecies ==
- Tristrophis rectifascia rectifascia
- Tristrophis rectifascia asymetricaria (Oberthur, 1923)
- Tristrophis rectifascia opisthommata Wehrli, 1923
