= Endropiodes =

Scientific classification
- Kingdom: Animalia
- Phylum: Arthropoda
- Clade: Pancrustacea
- Class: Insecta
- Order: Lepidoptera
- Family: Geometridae
- Tribe: Ourapterygini
- Genus: Endropiodes; Warren, 1894

Genus of moths

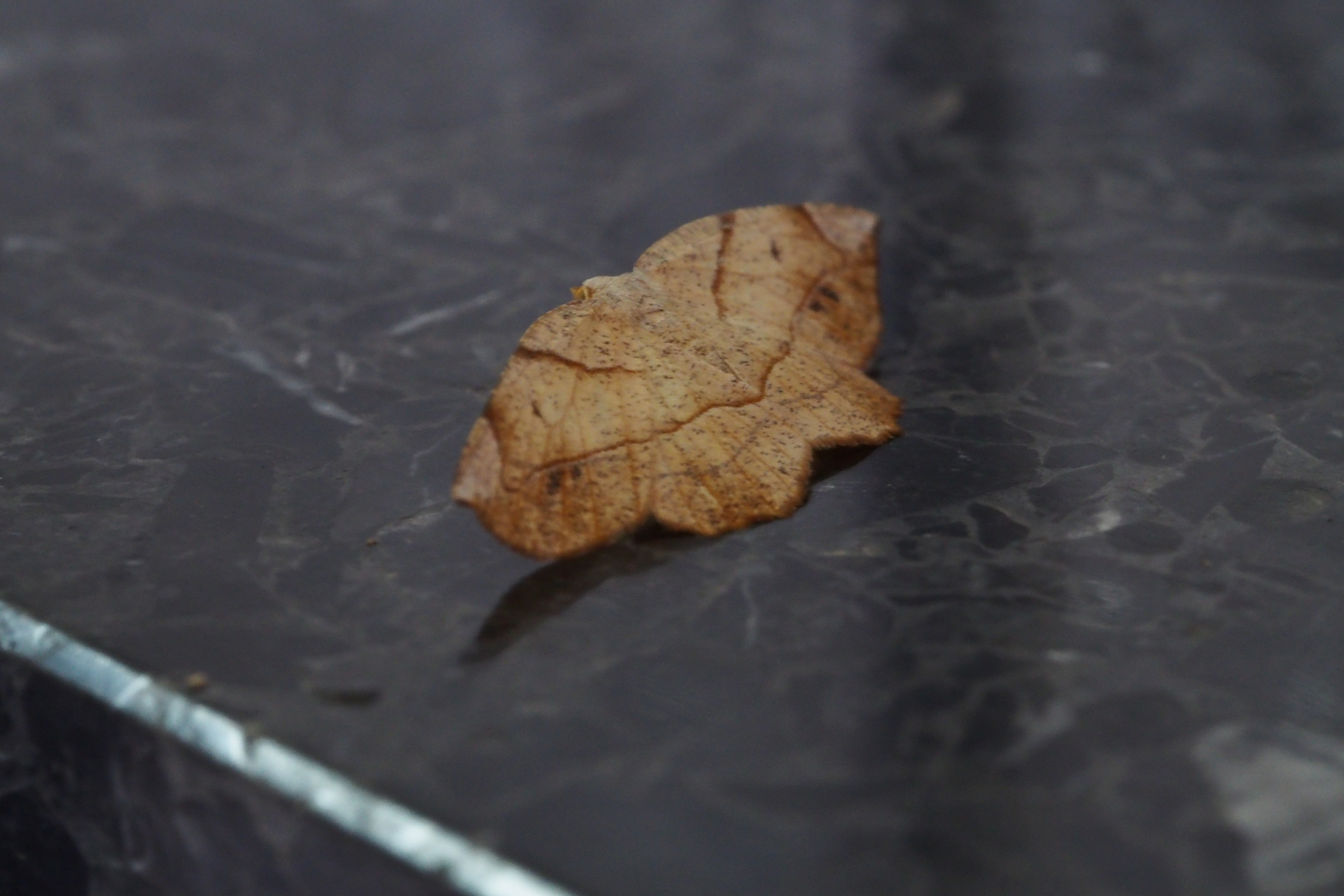
Endropiodes indictinaria

Endropiodes is a genus of moths in the family Geometridae.

== Species ==
- Endropiodes abjecta (Butler, 1879)
- Endropiodes indictinaria (Bremer, 1864)
