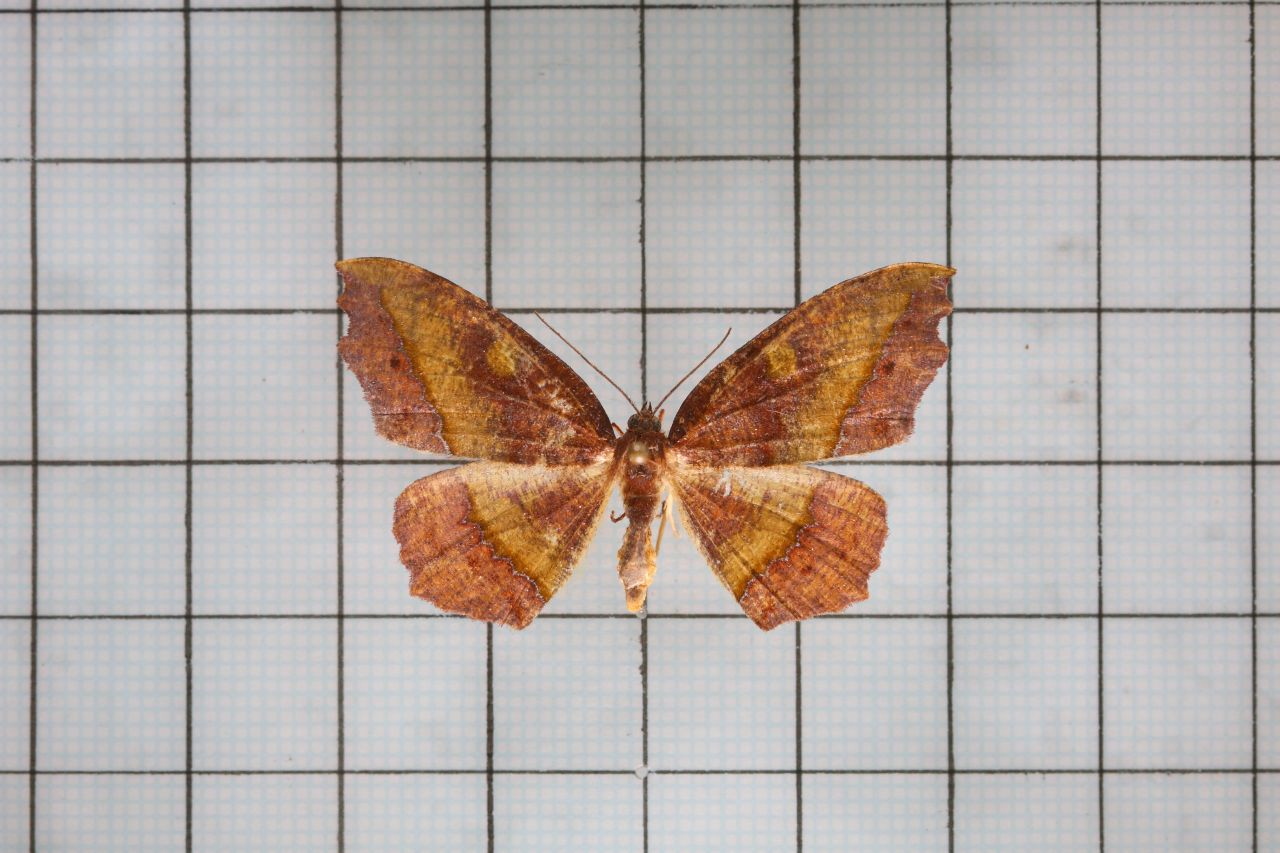

Scientific classification
- Kingdom: Animalia
- Phylum: Arthropoda
- Class: Insecta
- Order: Lepidoptera
- Family: Geometridae
- Tribe: Ourapterygini
- Genus: Leptomiza; Warren, 1893

Synonyms
- Pristopera Swinhoe, 1900

= Leptomiza =

Genus of moths

Leptomiza is a genus of moths in the family Geometridae.

== Species ==
- Leptomiza bilinearia (Leech, 1897)
- Leptomiza calcearia (Walker, 1860)
- Leptomiza hepaticata (Swinhoe, 1900)
- Leptomiza parableta Prout, 1926
- Leptomiza prochlora Wehrli, 1936
- Leptomiza rufitinctaria Hampson, 1902
