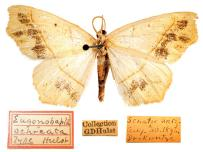

Scientific classification
- Domain: Eukaryota
- Kingdom: Animalia
- Phylum: Arthropoda
- Class: Insecta
- Order: Lepidoptera
- Family: Geometridae
- Genus: Pionenta
- Species: P. ochreata

Binomial name
- Pionenta ochreata (Hulst, 1898)

Synonyms
- Antepione ochreata (Hulst, 1898); Antepione hewesata Sperry, 1948; Sabulodes arizonata Taylor, 1905; Sabulodes dyari Grossbeck, 1908; Sabulodes ligata Grossbeck, 1908

= Pionenta ochreata =

Species of moth

Pionenta ochreata is a moth of the family Geometridae. It is known from Arizona and New Mexico.

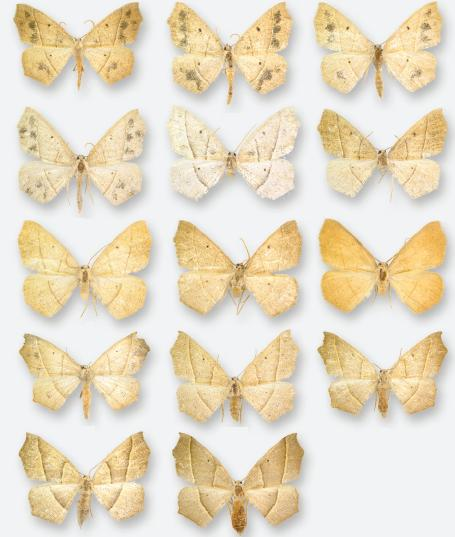
Variation in adults, upper three rows are males, bottom two are females

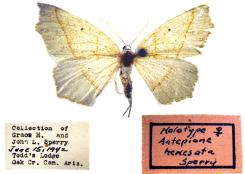
The holotype of Antepione hewesata, now considered a synonym of Pionenta ochreata

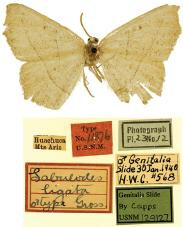
The holotype of Antepione hewesata, now considered a synonym of Sabulodes arizonata

The wingspan is about 26 mm. Adults are on wing from mid May to August in riparian canyons and dry coniferous forest up to 2,560 meters. There is probably more than one generation per year.
