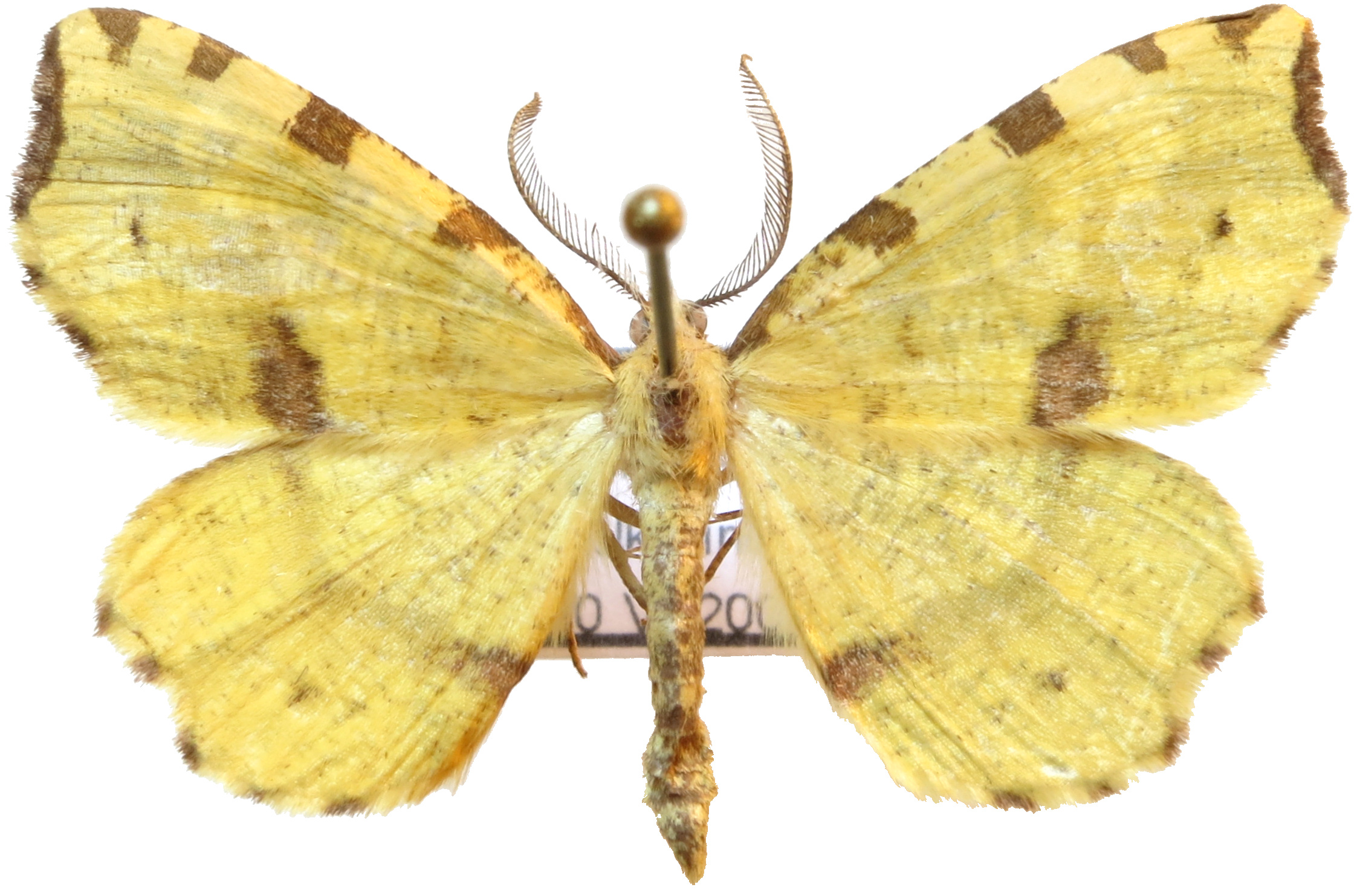
- T. flavicaria from Cherkasy, Ukraine

Scientific classification
- Kingdom: Animalia
- Phylum: Arthropoda
- Clade: Pancrustacea
- Class: Insecta
- Order: Lepidoptera
- Family: Geometridae
- Tribe: Ourapterygini
- Genus: Therapis; Hübner, 1823
- Species: T. flavicaria

Binomial name
- Therapis flavicaria (Denis & Schiffermuller, 1775)

Synonyms
- Geometra flavicaria Denis & Schiffermuller, 1775

= Therapis =

Genus of moths

Therapis is a monotypic genus of moths in the family Geometridae first described by Jacob Hübner in 1823. Its only species, Therapis flavicaria, was first described by Michael Denis and Ignaz Schiffermüller in 1775. It is found in south-eastern and eastern Europe, east to Turkey, Russia and Georgia.

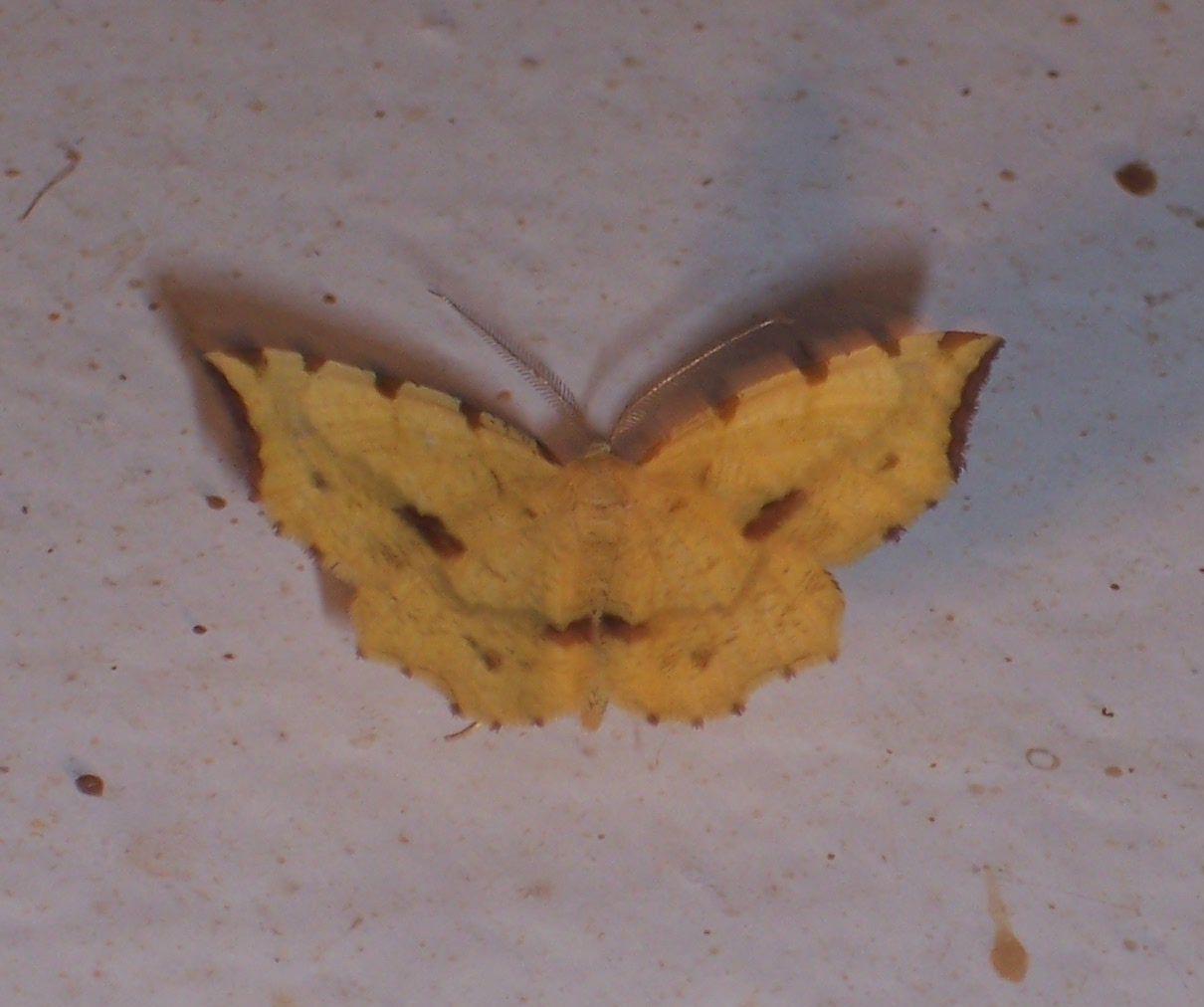

The wingspan is 26–30 mm.

The larvae feed on various Lamiaceae species, including Lamium and Galeopsis.
