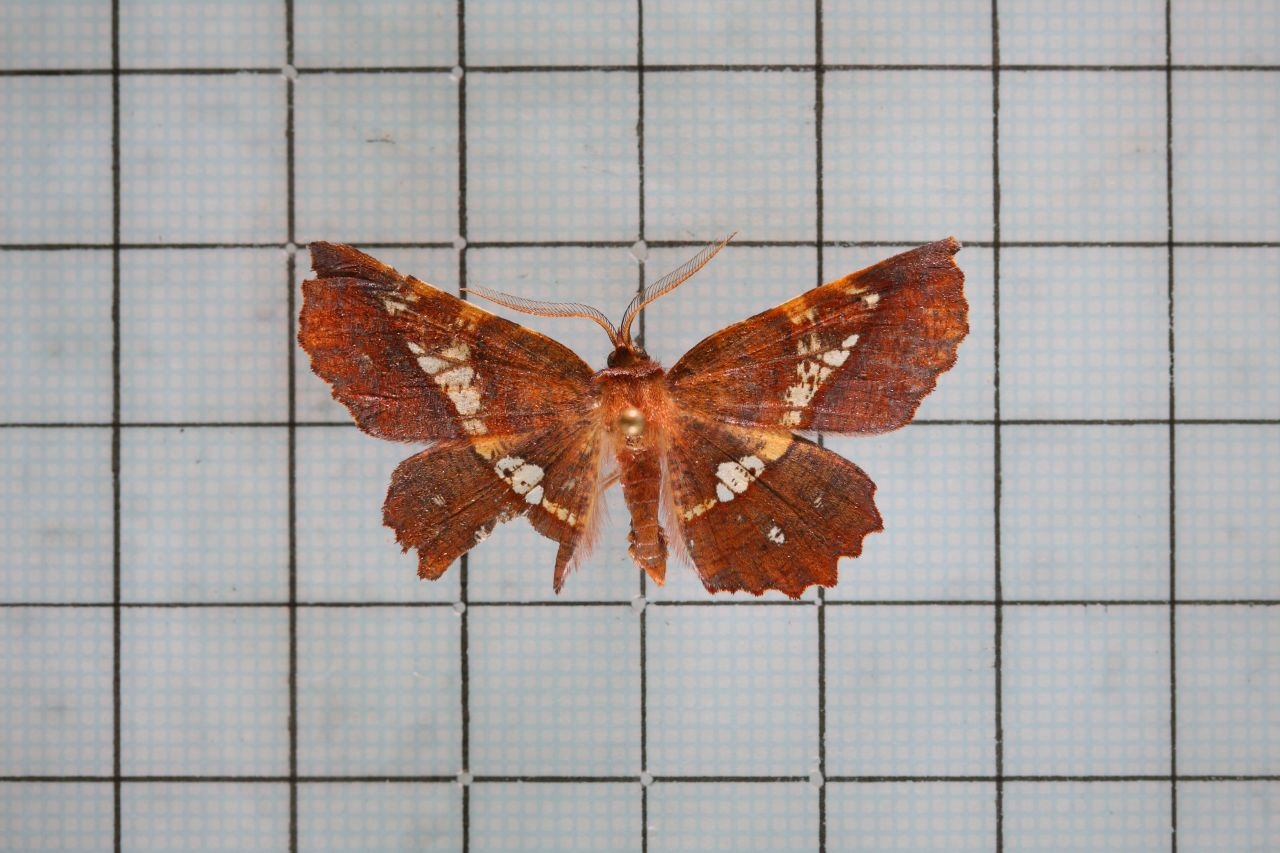
- Garaeus specularis

Scientific classification
- Domain: Eukaryota
- Kingdom: Animalia
- Phylum: Arthropoda
- Class: Insecta
- Order: Lepidoptera
- Family: Geometridae
- Tribe: Ourapterygini
- Genus: Garaeus; Moore, [1868]

= Garaeus =

Genus of moths

Garaeus is a genus of moths in the family Geometridae described by Frederic Moore in 1868.

== Selected species ==
- Garaeus absona C. Swinhoe, 1889
- Garaeus acuminaria Leech, 1897
- Garaeus albipunctatus Hampson, 1895
- Garaeus altapicata Holloway, 1976
- Garaeus apicata Moore, 1868
- Garaeus argillacea Butler, 1889
- Garaeus chamaeleon Wehrli, 1936
- Garaeus colorata Warren, 1893
- Garaeus conspicienda Holloway, 1993
- Garaeus cruentatus Butler, 1886
- Garaeus fenestratus Butler, 1887
- Garaeus ferrugata Warren, 1896
- Garaeus flavipicta Hampson, 1912
- Garaeus formosanus Bastelberger, 1911
- Garaeus fulvata Walker, 1861
- Garaeus karykina Wehrli, 1924
- Garaeus kiushiuana (Hori, 1926)
- Garaeus lateritiaria (Poujade, 1895)
- Garaeus luteus (Wileman, 1910)
- Garaeus mirandus (Butler, 1881)
- Garaeus muscorarius Hampson, 1897
- Garaeus nankingensis Wehrli, 1937
- Garaeus nigra Inoue, 1954
- Garaeus niveivertex Wehrli, 1936
- Garaeus olivescens Moore, 1888
- Garaeus opicarius Joannis, 1929
- Garaeus papuensis Warren, 1906
- Garaeus parva Hedemann, 1881
- Garaeus phthinophylla Prout, 1928
- Garaeus punctigerus Wehrli, 1926
- Garaeus purpurascens Joicey and Talbot, 1917
- Garaeus pyrsa Prout, 1925
- Garaeus signata Butler, 1886
- Garaeus specularis Moore, 1868
- Garaeus subsparsus Wehrli, 1937
- Garaeus ulucens Holloway, 1976
- Garaeus ustapex Wehrli, 1936
- Garaeus violacearia Leech, 1897
- Garaeus violaria Prout, 1922
- Garaeus virilis Prout, 1915
