= Eriplatymetra =

Scientific classification
- Kingdom: Animalia
- Phylum: Arthropoda
- Class: Insecta
- Order: Lepidoptera
- Family: Geometridae
- Tribe: Ourapterygini
- Genus: Eriplatymetra; Grote, 1873

Genus of moths

Eriplatymetra is a genus of moths in the family Geometridae erected by Augustus Radcliffe Grote in 1873.

== Species ==
- Eriplatymetra coloradaria (Grote & Robinson, 1867)
- Eriplatymetra grotearia (Packard, 1876)
- Eriplatymetra lentifluata Barnes & McDunnough, 1917
