= Scardamia metallaria =

Scientific classification
- Kingdom: Animalia
- Phylum: Arthropoda
- Class: Insecta
- Order: Lepidoptera
- Family: Geometridae
- Genus: Scardamia
- Species: S. metallaria

Binomial name
- Scardamia metallaria Guenée, 1858

Species of moth

Scardamia metallaria is a moth of the family Geometridae first described by Achille Guenée in 1858. It is found in Sri Lanka, India and Australia.

Host plants of caterpillar include Flacourtia species.
