= Sicyopsis =

Scientific classification
- Kingdom: Animalia
- Phylum: Arthropoda
- Class: Insecta
- Order: Lepidoptera
- Family: Geometridae
- Tribe: Ourapterygini
- Genus: Sicyopsis

Genus of moths

Sicyopsis is a genus of moths in the family Geometridae.
