= Anthyperythra =

Scientific classification
- Kingdom: Animalia
- Phylum: Arthropoda
- Class: Insecta
- Order: Lepidoptera
- Family: Geometridae
- Tribe: Ourapterygini
- Genus: Anthyperythra; Swinhoe, 1891

Genus of geometer moths

Anthyperythra is a genus of moths in the family Geometridae described by Swinhoe in 1891.

== Species ==
- Anthyperythra hermearia Swinhoe, 1891
