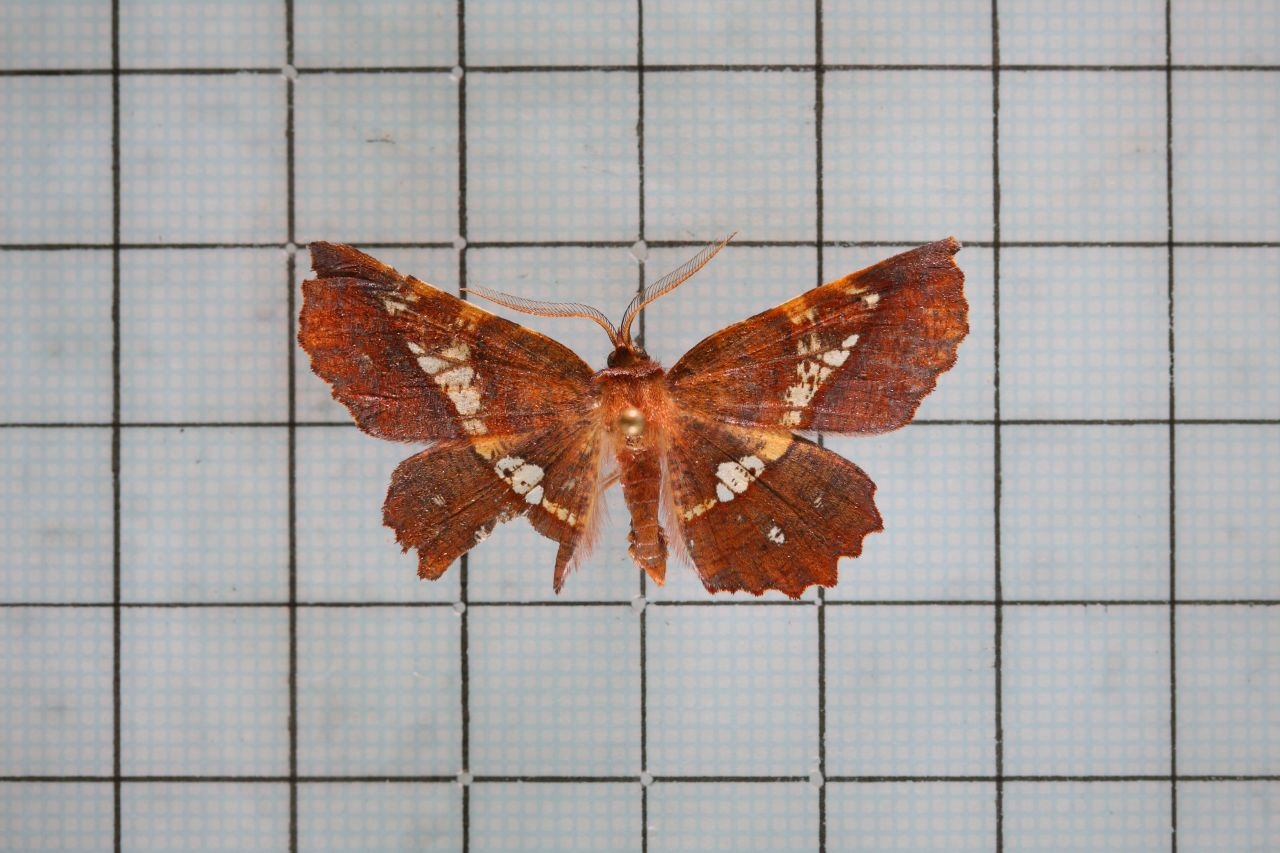

Scientific classification
- Domain: Eukaryota
- Kingdom: Animalia
- Phylum: Arthropoda
- Class: Insecta
- Order: Lepidoptera
- Family: Geometridae
- Genus: Garaeus
- Species: G. specularis

Binomial name
- Garaeus specularis Moore, 1868

Synonyms
- Endropia mactans Butler, 1878; Garaeus nankingensis Wehrli, 1940; Pericallia olivescens Moore, 1888

= Garaeus specularis =

Species of moth

Garaeus specularis is a moth of the family Geometridae first described by Frederic Moore in 1868. It is found from India to Japan.

The wingspan is 35–40 mm for subspecies specularis and 28–39 mm for subspecies mactans.

== Subspecies ==
- Garaeus specularis specularis
- Garaeus specularis fenestratus Butler, 1881
- Garaeus specularis latior Wehrli, 1940
- Garaeus specularis mactans (Butler, 1878) (Japan)
