= Enanthyperythra =

Scientific classification
- Kingdom: Animalia
- Phylum: Arthropoda
- Class: Insecta
- Order: Lepidoptera
- Family: Geometridae
- Tribe: Ourapterygini
- Genus: Enanthyperythra; Wehrli, 1937

Genus of moths

Enanthyperythra is a genus of moths in the family Geometridae.

== Species ==
- Enanthyperythra legataria (Herrich-Schäffer, [1852])
