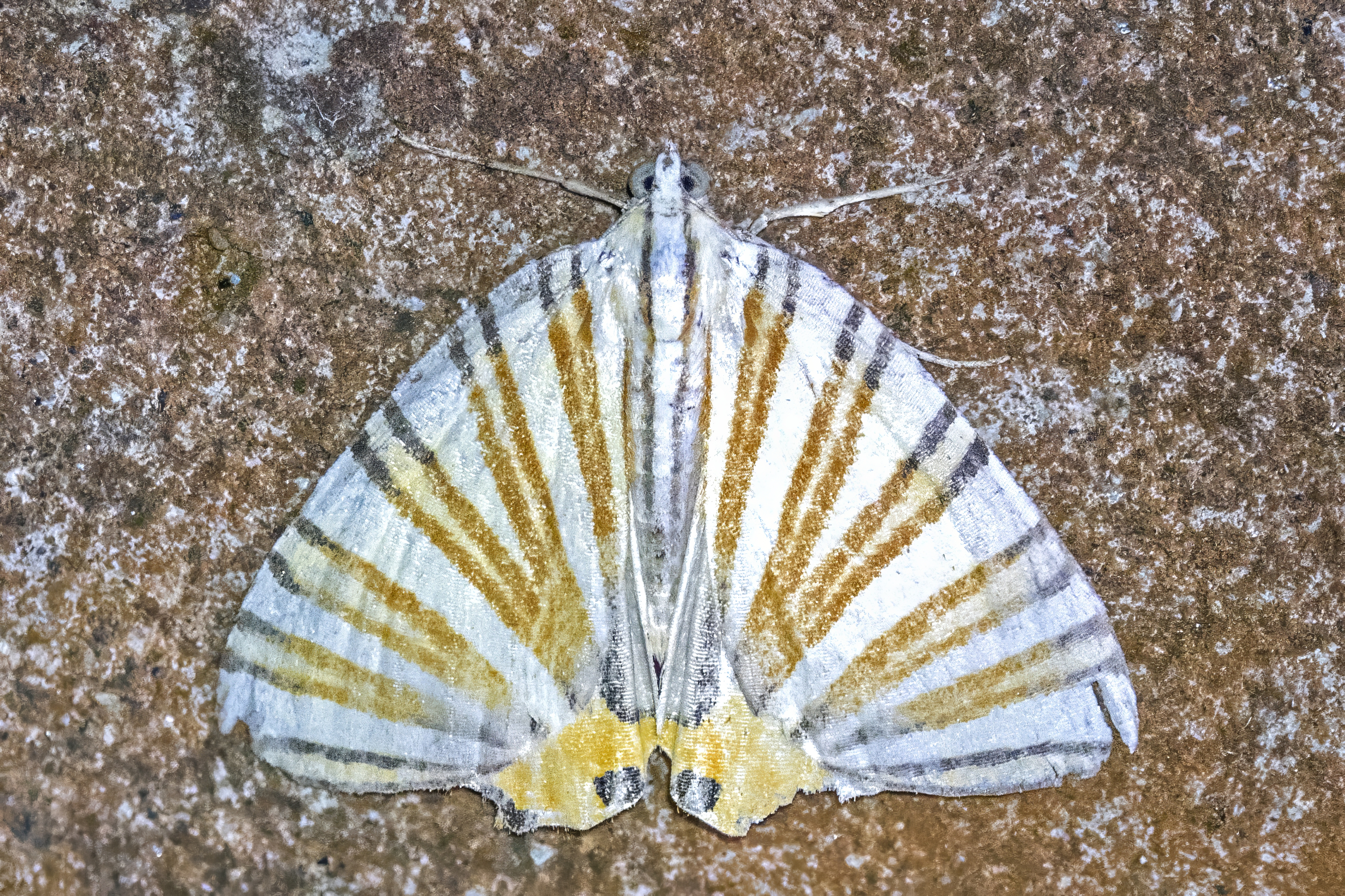
- P. histrionaria, Ecuador

Scientific classification
- Kingdom: Animalia
- Phylum: Arthropoda
- Class: Insecta
- Order: Lepidoptera
- Family: Geometridae
- Tribe: Ourapterygini
- Genus: Pityeja; Walker, 1861

Synonyms
- Aplorama Warren, 1904

= Pityeja =

Genus of moths

Pityeja is a Neotropical moth genus in the family Geometridae erected by Francis Walker in 1861.

Pityeja have relatively conspicuous wing patterns, which probably led to overestimation of their species richness in the past.

== Species ==
- Pityeja histrionaria (Herrich-Schäffer, 1853)
- Pityeja nazada (Druce, 1892)
