= Eriplatymetra grotearia =

Scientific classification
- Kingdom: Animalia
- Phylum: Arthropoda
- Clade: Pancrustacea
- Class: Insecta
- Order: Lepidoptera
- Family: Geometridae
- Genus: Eriplatymetra
- Species: E. grotearia

Binomial name
- Eriplatymetra grotearia (Packard, 1876)

Synonyms
- Euemera angularia Grossbeck, 1908; Eugonia vidularia Grote, 1882; Tetracis grotearia Packard, 1876

Species of moth

Eriplatymetra grotearia is a species of geometrid moth in the family Geometridae. It is found in North America.

Its specific range is not always well-documented, but it is generally known from forested or wooded habitats, like many geometrid moths.

The MONA or Hodges number for Eriplatymetra grotearia is 6854. This is useful for referencing it in field guides or databases like the Moth Photographers Group.
