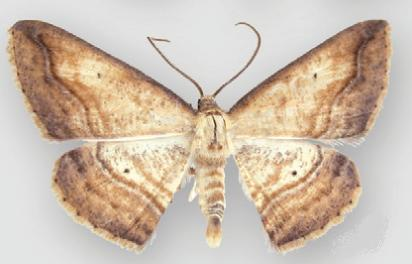
- Male
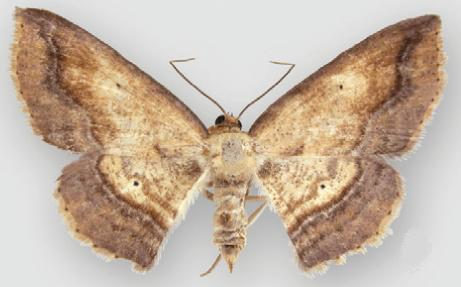
- Female

Scientific classification
- Domain: Eukaryota
- Kingdom: Animalia
- Phylum: Arthropoda
- Class: Insecta
- Order: Lepidoptera
- Family: Geometridae
- Genus: Campatonema
- Species: C. lineata

Binomial name
- Campatonema lineata (Schaus, 1911)

Synonyms
- Sabulodes lineata Schaus, 1911

= Campatonema lineata =

Species of moth

Campatonema lineata is a moth of the family Geometridae first described by William Schaus in 1911. It is found in the provinces of Alajuela, Cartago, Guanacaste, and Puntarenas in Costa Rica, at elevations from 700 to 1500 meters.

The length of the forewings is 14–15 mm. Adults are on the wing throughout the year.
