= Eucaterva =

Scientific classification
- Kingdom: Animalia
- Phylum: Arthropoda
- Class: Insecta
- Order: Lepidoptera
- Family: Geometridae
- Tribe: Ourapterygini
- Genus: Eucaterva; Grote, 1882

Genus of moths

Eucaterva is a genus of moths in the family Geometridae erected by Augustus Radcliffe Grote in 1882.

== Species ==
- Eucaterva bonniwelli Cassino & Swett, 1922
- Eucaterva variaria Grote, 1882
