= Somatolophia haydenata =

Scientific classification
- Kingdom: Animalia
- Phylum: Arthropoda
- Class: Insecta
- Order: Lepidoptera
- Family: Geometridae
- Genus: Somatolophia
- Species: S. haydenata

Binomial name
- Somatolophia haydenata (Packard, 1876)

Species of moth

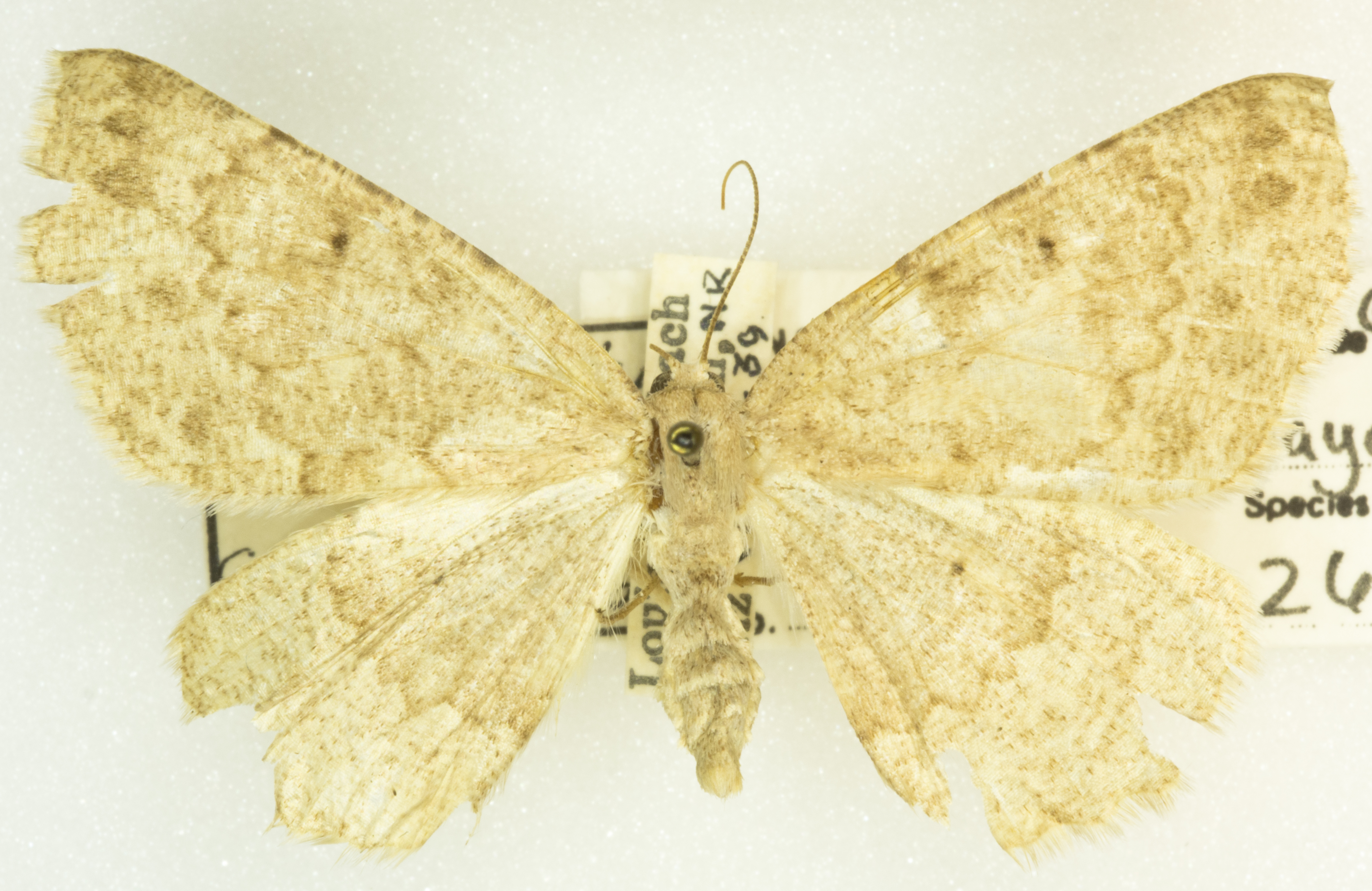
Somatolophia haydenata

Somatolophia haydenata is a species of moth in the family Geometridae first described by Alpheus Spring Packard in 1876. It is found in North America.

The MONA or Hodges number for Somatolophia haydenata is 6947.
