= Acanthotoca graefii =

Scientific classification
- Kingdom: Animalia
- Phylum: Arthropoda
- Clade: Pancrustacea
- Class: Insecta
- Order: Lepidoptera
- Family: Geometridae
- Genus: Acanthotoca
- Species: A. graefii

Binomial name
- Acanthotoca graefii (Hulst, 1896)

Synonyms
- Acanthophora graefii Hulst, 1896

Species of moth

Acanthotoca graefii is a species of geometrid moth in the family Geometridae. It is found in North America.
