= Pionenta =

Scientific classification
- Domain: Eukaryota
- Kingdom: Animalia
- Phylum: Arthropoda
- Class: Insecta
- Order: Lepidoptera
- Family: Geometridae
- Tribe: Ourapterygini
- Genus: Pionenta; Ferris, 2010

Genus of moths

Pionenta is a genus of moths in the family Geometridae erected by Clifford D. Ferris in 2010.

== Species ==
- Pionenta ochreata (Hulst, 1898)
