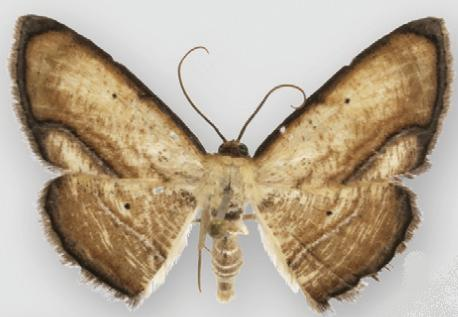
- Male
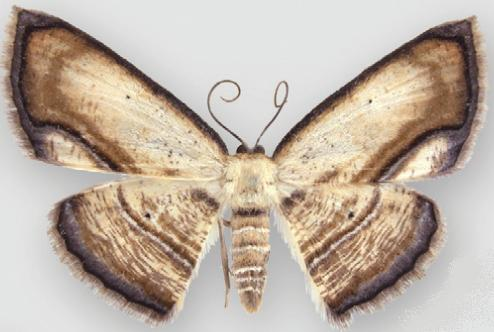
- Female

Scientific classification
- Domain: Eukaryota
- Kingdom: Animalia
- Phylum: Arthropoda
- Class: Insecta
- Order: Lepidoptera
- Family: Geometridae
- Genus: Campatonema
- Species: C. tapantia

Binomial name
- Campatonema tapantia Sullivan, 2010

= Campatonema tapantia =

Species of moth

Campatonema tapantia is a moth of the family Geometridae first described by Sullivan in 2010. It is found in the provinces of Alajuela, Cartago and Heredia in Costa Rica. It has been found along a rather narrow elevational range, from 1100 to 1600 meters.

The length of the forewings is 15–16 mm (0.59–0.63 in). Adults are on the wing throughout the year.

== Etymology ==
The name refers to Tapanti National Park, Costa Rica, the location where the species has been found most frequently.
