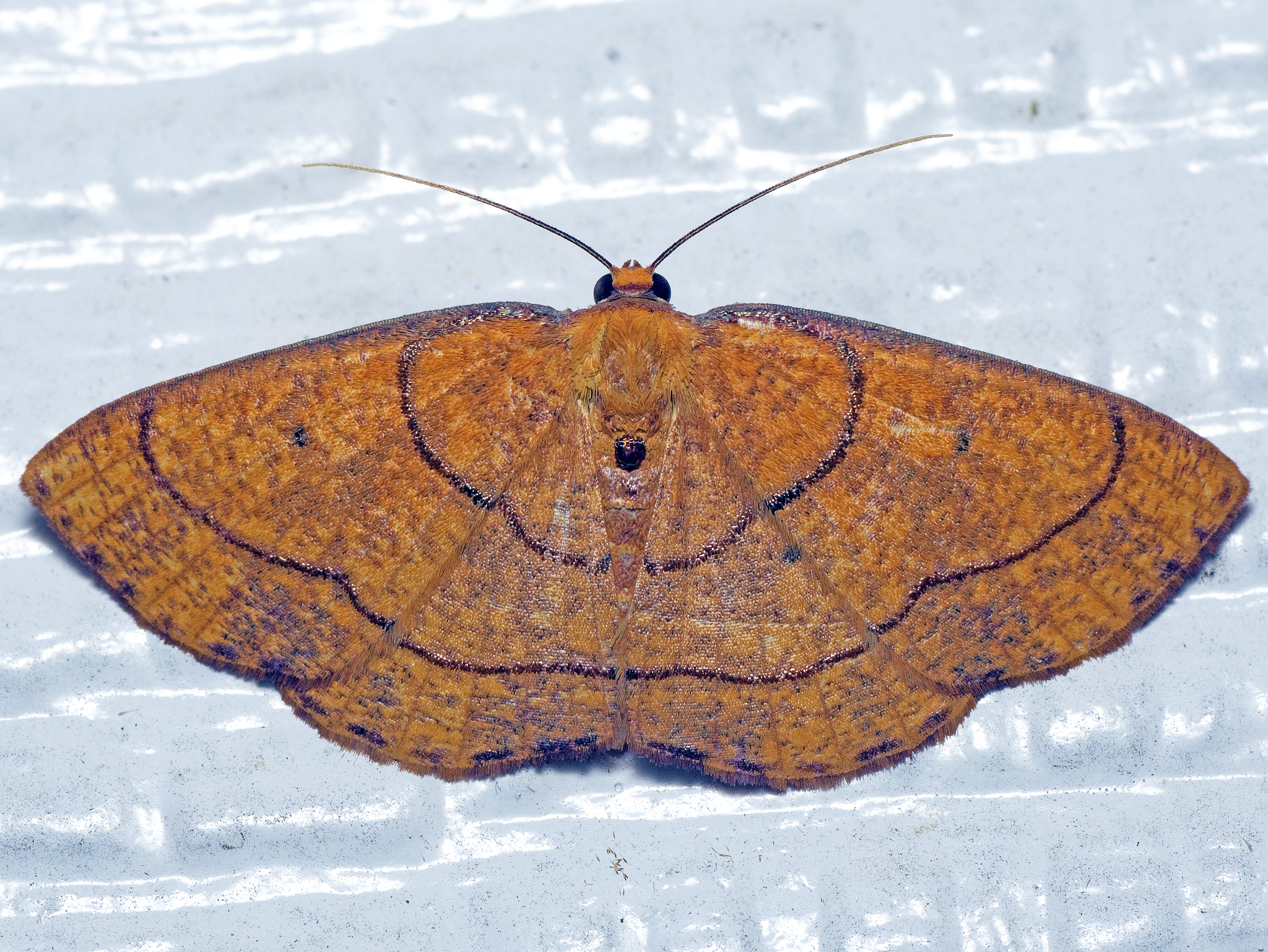
- Scardamia chrysolina

Scientific classification
- Kingdom: Animalia
- Phylum: Arthropoda
- Class: Insecta
- Order: Lepidoptera
- Family: Geometridae
- Tribe: Ourapterygini
- Genus: Scardamia; Guenée, 1857

Synonyms
- Lagnia Walker, 1860

= Scardamia =

Genus of moths

Scardamia is a genus of moths in the family Geometridae.

== Description ==
Palpi smoothly scaled and not reaching beyond the frons. Antennae of male bipectinated. Hind tibia not dilated. Forewings with vein 3 from before angle of cell. Veins 7 to 9 stalked from before upper angle and veins 10 and 11 stalked, anastomosing with vein 12. Hindwings with vein 3 from before angle of cell and vein 7 from before upper angle.

== Species ==
- Scardamia aurantiacaria Bremer, 1864
- Scardamia bractearia (Walker, 1860)
- Scardamia chrysolina Meyrick, 1892 (Australia)
- Scardamia iographa Prout, 1932 (Borneo, Malaysia)
- Scardamia ithyzona Turner, 1919 (Australia)
- Scardamia maculata Warren, 1897 ( Central & E.Africa, Madagascar)
- Scardamia metallaria Guenée, 1858 (India, S.E.Asia, Australia)
- Scardamia nubilicosta L. B. Prout, 1932 (Congo, Nigeria)
- Scardamia obliquaria Leech, 1897
- Scardamian seminigra Prout, 1925
- Scardamia xylosmaria Sato, C.M. Fu & Kawakami, 2011 (Japan)
