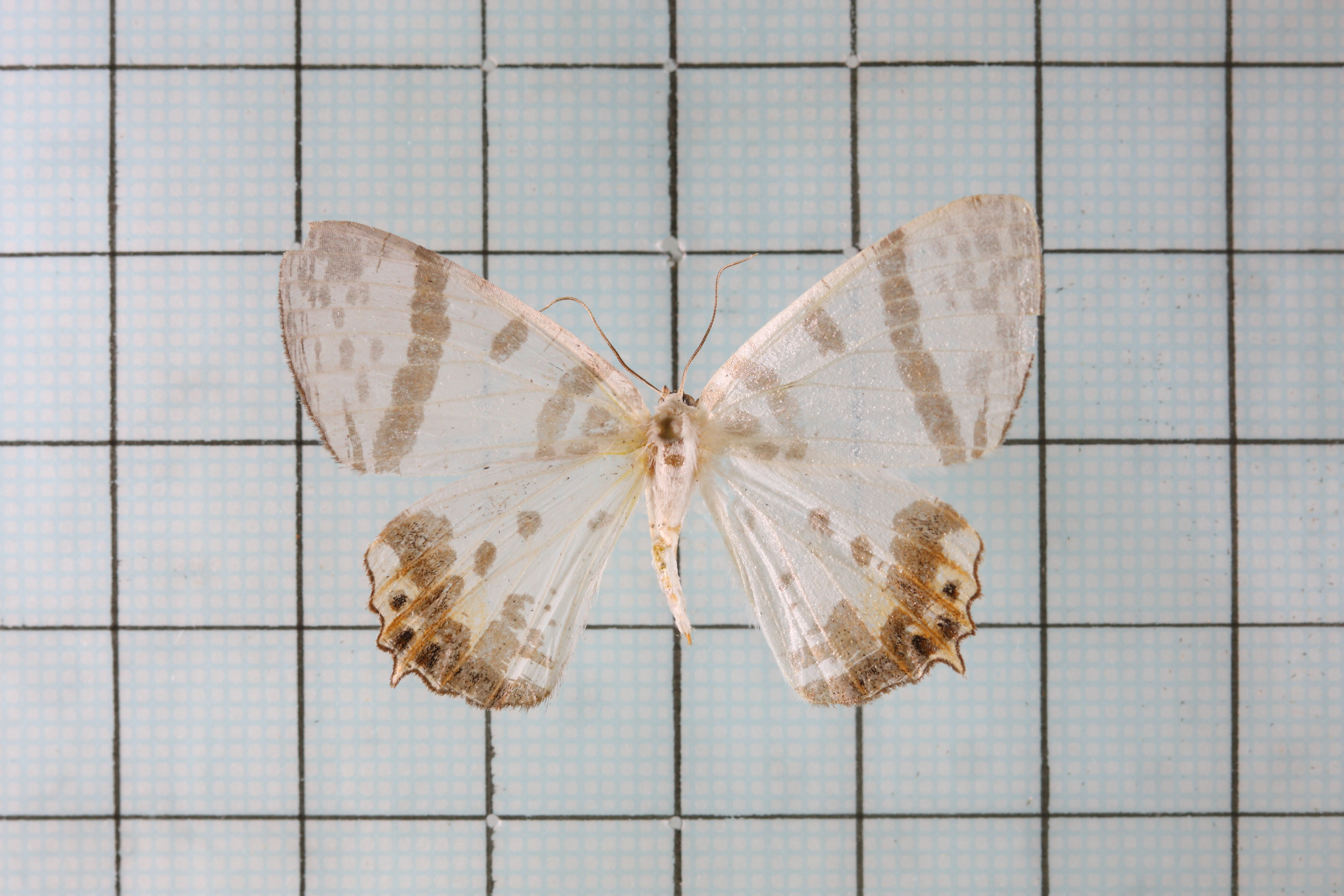
- Tristrophis rectifascia

Scientific classification
- Kingdom: Animalia
- Phylum: Arthropoda
- Class: Insecta
- Order: Lepidoptera
- Family: Geometridae
- Tribe: Ourapterygini
- Genus: Tristrophis; Butler, 1883

= Tristrophis =

Genus of moths

Tristrophis is a genus of moths in the family Geometridae.

== Species ==
- Tristrophis cupido Oberthur, 1923
- Tristrophis rectifascia (Wileman, 1912)
- Tristrophis siaolouaria (Oberthur, 1911)
- Tristrophis veneris (Butler, 1878)
