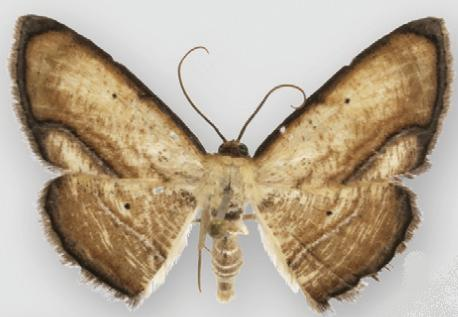
- Male Campatonema tapantia

Scientific classification
- Domain: Eukaryota
- Kingdom: Animalia
- Phylum: Arthropoda
- Class: Insecta
- Order: Lepidoptera
- Family: Geometridae
- Tribe: Ourapterygini
- Genus: Campatonema; E. D. Jones, 1921

= Campatonema =

Genus of moths

Campatonema is a genus of moths in the family Geometridae described by E. Dukinfield Jones in 1921.

== Species ==
- Campatonema lineata (Schaus, 1911)
- Campatonema marginata E. D. Jones, 1921
- Campatonema tapantia Sullivan, 2010
- Campatonema yanayacua Sullivan, 2010
