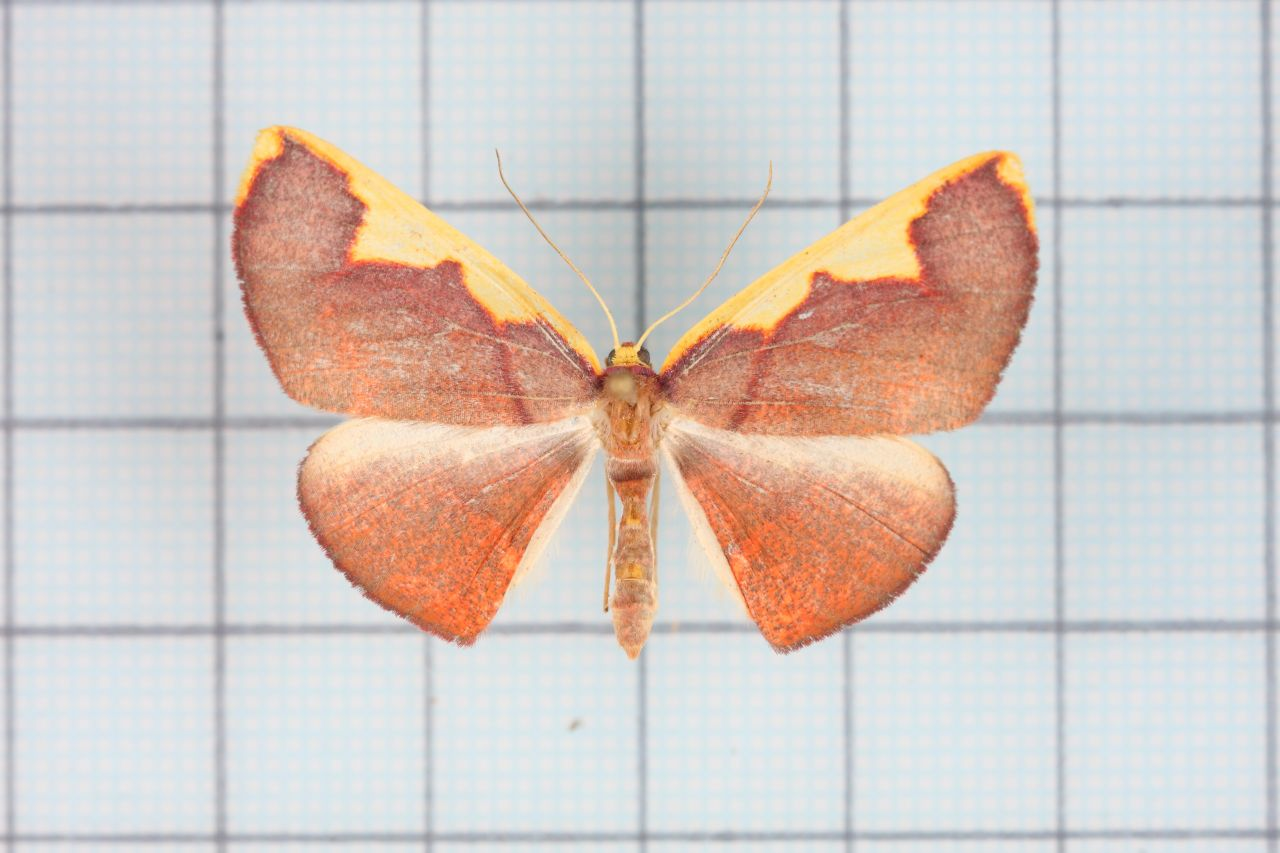
- Nothomiza flavicosta

Scientific classification
- Kingdom: Animalia
- Phylum: Arthropoda
- Class: Insecta
- Order: Lepidoptera
- Family: Geometridae
- Tribe: Ourapterygini
- Genus: Nothomiza; Warren, 1894

Synonyms
- Organomiza Wehrli, 1936

= Nothomiza =

Genus of moths

Nothomiza is a genus of moth in the family Geometridae described by Warren in 1894.

== Species ==
- Nothomiza submediostrigata Wehrli, 1939
- Nothomiza costalis (Moore, [1868]) Bengal
- Nothomiza formosa (Butler, 1878) Japan
- Nothomiza xanthocolona (Meyrick, 1897) Borneo, possibly Singapore
- Nothomiza flavicosta Prout, 1914 Taiwan
