= Acanthotoca =

Scientific classification
- Kingdom: Animalia
- Phylum: Arthropoda
- Class: Insecta
- Order: Lepidoptera
- Family: Geometridae
- Tribe: Ourapterygini
- Genus: Acanthotoca; D. S. Fletcher, 1979

Genus of geometer moths

Acanthotoca is a genus of moths in the family Geometridae. It was described by David Stephen Fletcher in 1979.

== Species ==
- Acanthotoca graefi (Hulst, 1896)
- Acanthotoca graefii
- Acanthotoca muelleri
