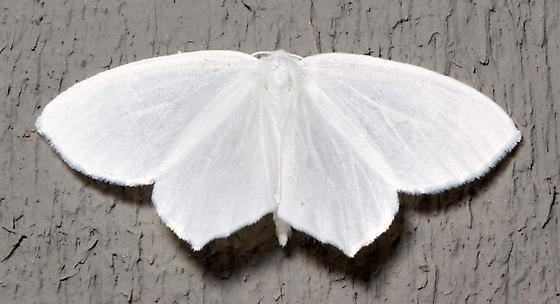

Scientific classification
- Kingdom: Animalia
- Phylum: Arthropoda
- Class: Insecta
- Order: Lepidoptera
- Family: Geometridae
- Tribe: Ourapterygini
- Genus: Eugonobapta; Warren, 1894
- Species: E. nivosaria

Binomial name
- Eugonobapta nivosaria (Guenée, 1857)

Synonyms
- Acidalia nivosaria Guenée, 1857

= Eugonobapta =

Genus of moths

Eugonobapta is a monotypic moth genus in the family Geometridae described by Warren in 1894. Its only species, Eugonobapta nivosaria, the snowy geometer, was first described by Achille Guenée in 1857. It is found in North America from Manitoba to New Brunswick, south to North Carolina and Tennessee.

The wingspan is 21–33 mm. Adults are on wing from April or May to July or August depending on the location. There are two generations per year.
