= Euaspilates =

Scientific classification
- Kingdom: Animalia
- Phylum: Arthropoda
- Class: Insecta
- Order: Lepidoptera
- Family: Geometridae
- Tribe: Ourapterygini
- Genus: Euaspilates; Packard, 1874

Genus of moths

Euaspilates is a genus of moths in the family Geometridae described by Packard in 1874.

== Species ==
- Euaspilates spinataria Packard, 1874
