= Artemidora =

Scientific classification
- Kingdom: Animalia
- Phylum: Arthropoda
- Class: Insecta
- Order: Lepidoptera
- Family: Geometridae
- Tribe: Ourapterygini
- Genus: Artemidora; Meyrick, 1892

Genus of moths

Artemidora is a genus of moths in the family Geometridae.

== Species ==
- Artemidora maracandaria (Erschoff, 1874)
- Artemidora metsaviiri Viidalepp, 1988
- Artemidora symmetrica Djakonov, 1923
