= Scardamia bractearia =

Scientific classification
- Kingdom: Animalia
- Phylum: Arthropoda
- Class: Insecta
- Order: Lepidoptera
- Family: Geometridae
- Genus: Scardamia
- Species: S. bractearia

Binomial name
- Scardamia bractearia (Walker, 1860)

Synonyms
- Laginia bractearia Walker, 1860

Species of moth

Scardamia bractearia is a moth of the family Geometridae first described by Francis Walker in 1860. It is found in Sri Lanka.
