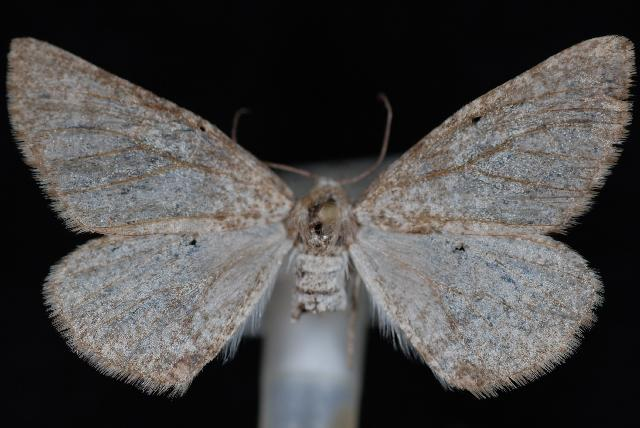
- Meris suffusaria

Scientific classification
- Kingdom: Animalia
- Phylum: Arthropoda
- Class: Insecta
- Order: Lepidoptera
- Family: Geometridae
- Tribe: Ourapterygini
- Genus: Meris; Hulst, 1896

= Meris =

Genus of moths

Meris is a genus of moths in the family Geometridae described by George Duryea Hulst in 1896.

== Species ==
- Meris paradoxa Rindge, 1981
- Meris suffusaria McDunnough, 1940
- Meris patula Rindge, 1981
- Meris alticola Hulst, 1896
- Meris cultrata Rindge, 1981
