= Melemaea =

Scientific classification
- Kingdom: Animalia
- Phylum: Arthropoda
- Class: Insecta
- Order: Lepidoptera
- Family: Geometridae
- Tribe: Ourapterygini
- Genus: Melemaea; Hulst, 1896

Genus of moths

Melemaea is a genus of moths in the family Geometridae described by George Duryea Hulst in 1896.

== Species ==
- Melemaea magdalena Hulst, 1896
- Melemaea virgata Taylor, 1906
