= Somatolophia =

Scientific classification
- Kingdom: Animalia
- Phylum: Arthropoda
- Class: Insecta
- Order: Lepidoptera
- Family: Geometridae
- Tribe: Ourapterygini
- Genus: Somatolophia; Hulst, 1896

Genus of moths

Somatolophia is a genus of moths in the family Geometridae described by George Duryea Hulst in 1896.

== Selected species ==
- Somatolophia haydenata (Packard, 1876)
- Somatolophia ectrapelaria (Grossbeck, 1908)
- Somatolophia pallescens McDunnough, 1940
