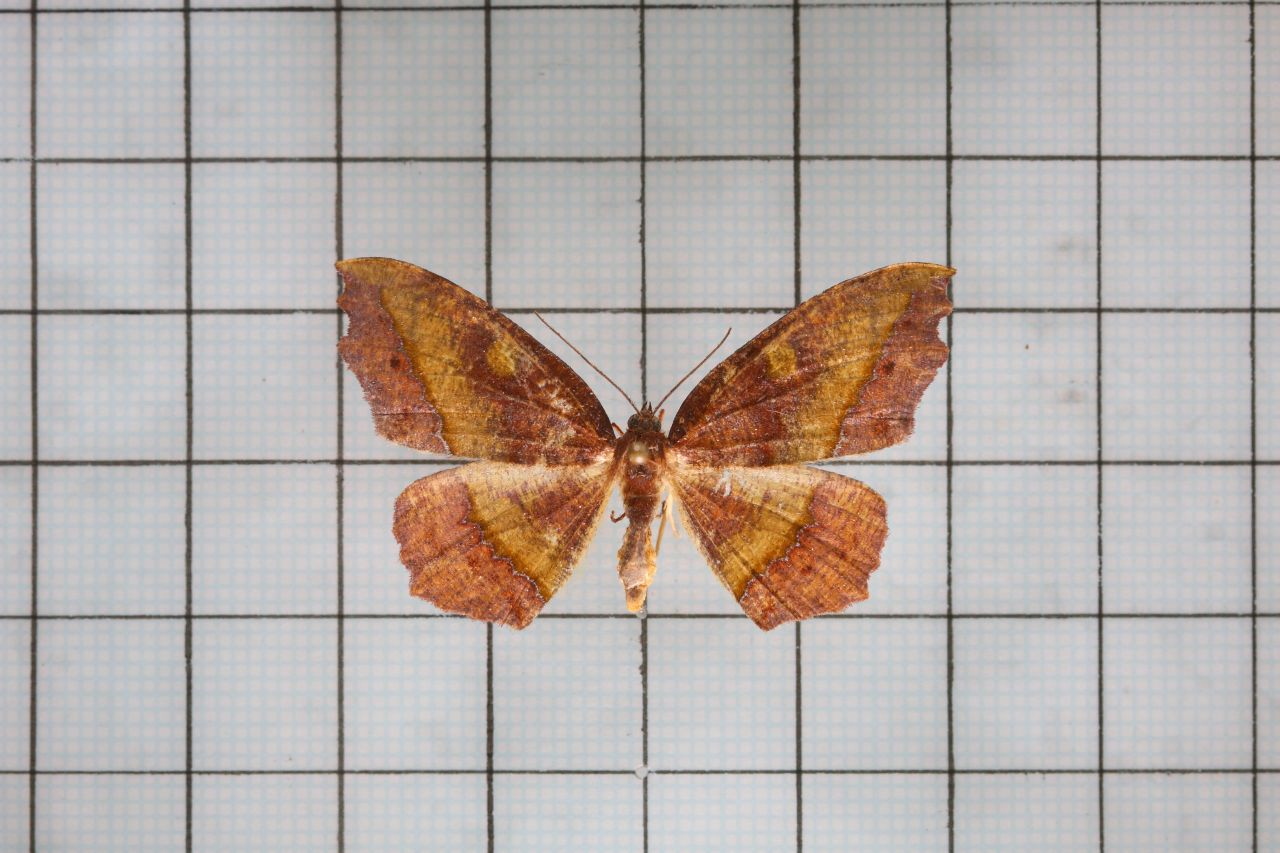

Scientific classification
- Kingdom: Animalia
- Phylum: Arthropoda
- Class: Insecta
- Order: Lepidoptera
- Family: Geometridae
- Genus: Leptomiza
- Species: L. calcearia

Binomial name
- Leptomiza calcearia (Walker, 1860)

Synonyms
- Hyperythra calcearia Walker 1860; Selenia dentilineata Moore, 1888; Heterolocha mediolimbata Poujade, 1895

= Leptomiza calcearia =

Species of moth

Leptomiza calcearia is a moth in the family Geometridae. It is found in Taiwan, Bhutan and India.

The wingspan is 36–42 mm.

== Subspecies ==
- Leptomiza calcearia calcearia
- Leptomiza calcearia apoleuca Wehrli, 1940
