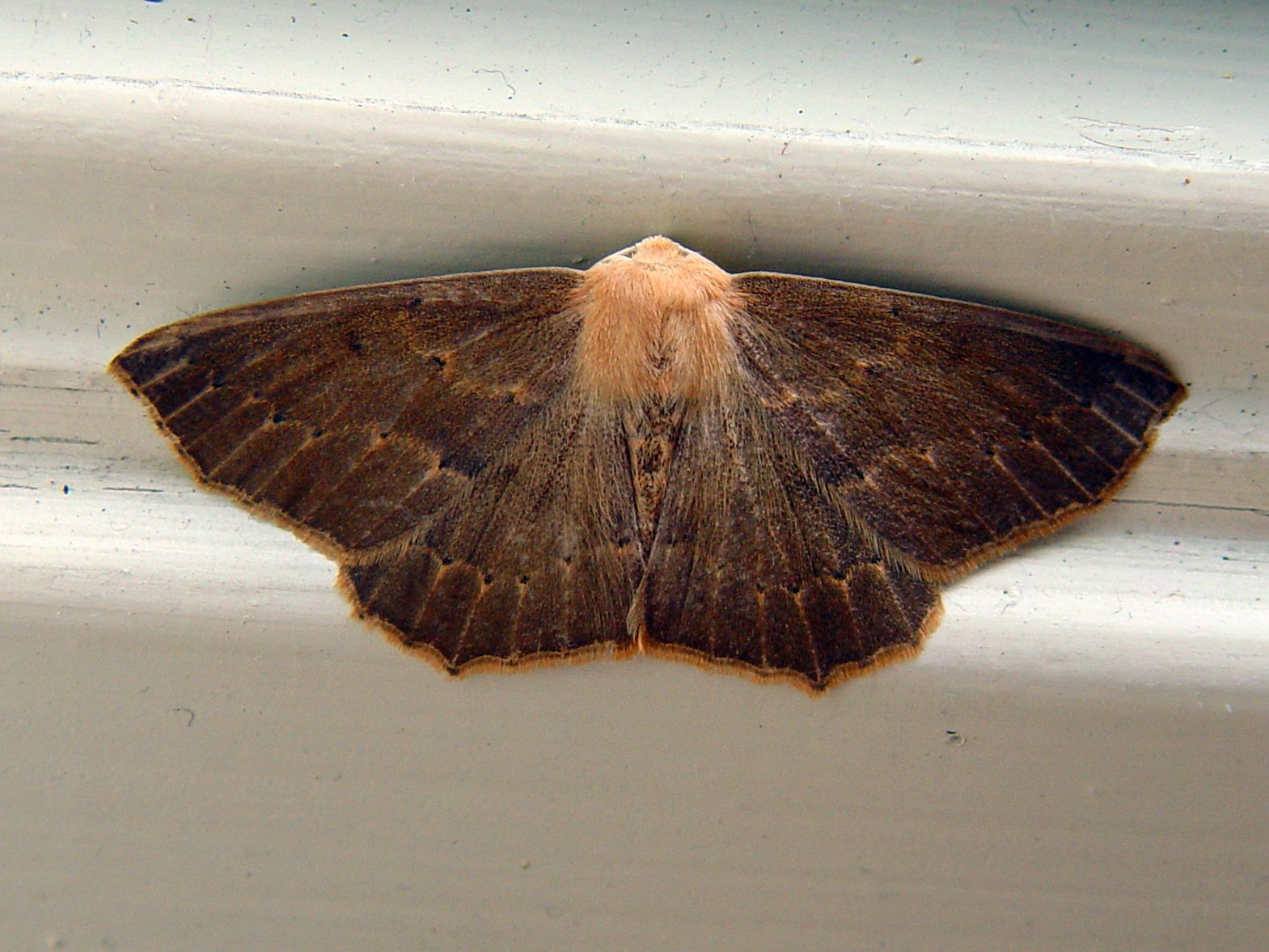
- Omnivorous looper (Sabulodes aegrotata), dark individual
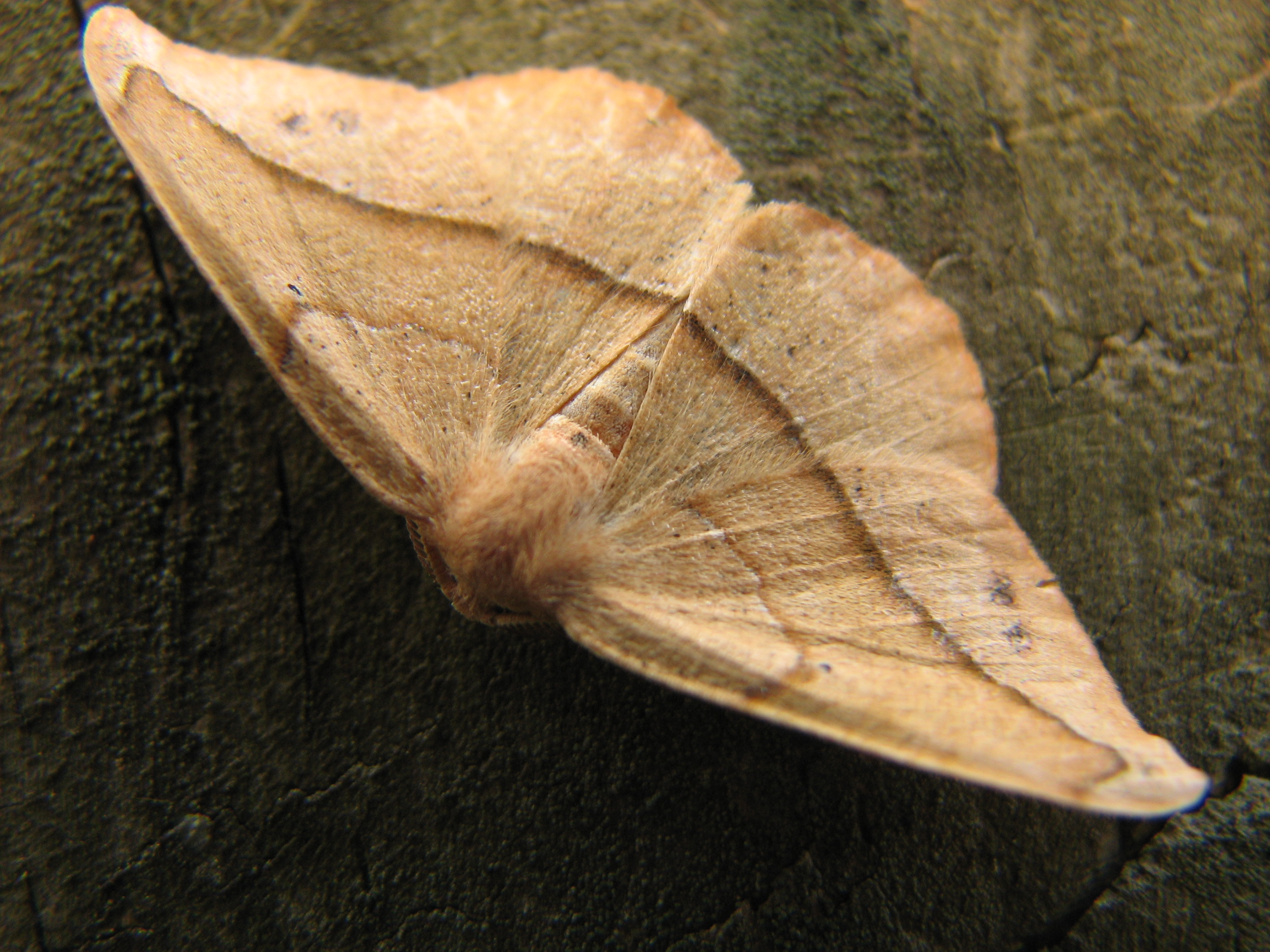
- Patalene olyzonaria

Scientific classification
- Kingdom: Animalia
- Phylum: Arthropoda
- Clade: Pancrustacea
- Class: Insecta
- Order: Lepidoptera
- Family: Geometridae
- Subfamily: Ennominae
- Tribe: Ourapterygini; Bruand, 1846

Genera
- About 60; see text

Synonyms
- Cingiliini Forbes, 1948; Emplocidae Guenée, 1858; Emplociini Guenée, 1858; Oxydiidae Butler, 1886; Oxydiini Butler, 1886; Urapteridae Bruand, 1846

= Ourapterygini =

Tribe of moths

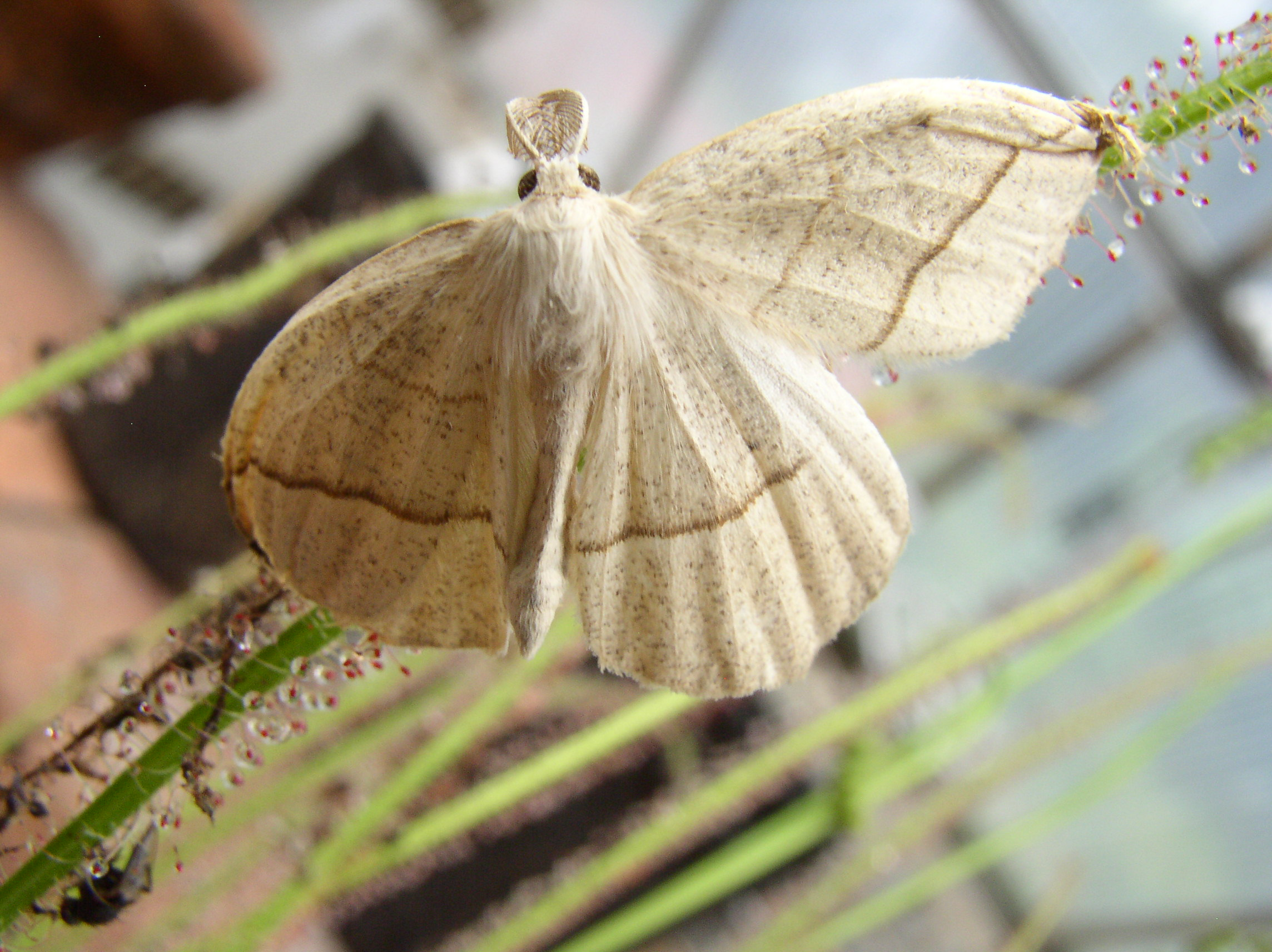
Eusarca confusaria trapped by the carnivorous plant Drosera filiformis

The Ourapterygini are one of the large tribes of geometer moths in the subfamily Ennominae. The tribe was described by Charles Théophile Bruand d'Uzelle in 1846. They are particularly plentiful in the Neotropics. Ourapterygini are generally held to be the youngest tribe of their subfamily, and at least seasonally have characteristic apomorphic asymmetrical processes of the anellus.

Many members of this tribe are remarkably butterfly like. The tribe contains more partially diurnal species than usual for geometer moths, and many do not have the cryptic coloration typical for the family. There is a tendency to light yellowish hues and either little or a quite bold pattern, making some species rather conspicuous. It is known that at least some are noxious to predators, and such coloration might be aposematic.

== Genera and selected species ==
As numerous Ennominae genera have not yet been assigned to a tribe, this genus list is preliminary.

- Acanthotoca
- Agaraeus
- Antepione
- Anthyperythra
- Artemidora
- Asovia
- Besma
- Campatonema
- Caripeta
- Cepphis
  - Little thorn, Cepphis advenaria
- Cingilia
- Destutia
- Enanthyperythra
- Endropiodes
- Enypia
- Epholca
- Epione
  - Bordered beauty, Epione repandaria
- Eriplatymetra
- Euaspilates
- Eucaterva
- Eugonobapta
- Eusarca
- Eutrapela
- Evita
- Garaeus
- Heterolocha
- Lambdina
- Leptomiza
- Lychnosea
- Melemaea
- Meris
- Nematocampa
- Nemeris
- Neoterpes
- Neotherina
- Nepheloleuca
- Nepytia
- Nothomiza
- Opisthograptis
  - Brimstone moth, Opisthograptis luteolata
- Ourapteryx
  - Swallow-tailed moth, Ourapteryx sambucaria
- Oxydia
- Patalene
- Pherne
- Philtraea
- Phyllodonta
- Pionenta
- Pityeja
- Plagodis
  - Scorched wing, Plagodis dolabraria
  - Barred umber, Plagodis pulveraria
- Plataea
- Prochoerodes
- Pseudopanthera
  - Speckled yellow, Pseudopanthera macularia
- Psilocerea
- Sabulodes
- Scardamia
- Sericoptera
- Sicya
- Sicyopsis
- Snowia
- Somatolophia
- Spilopera
- Synaxis
- Tetracis
- Therapis
- Tristrophis
- Tshimganitia
