= List of geometrid genera: N =

The very large moth family Geometridae contains genera beginning with A, B, C, D, E, F, G, H, I, J, K, L, M, N, O, P, Q, R, S, T, U, V, W, X, Y and Z.

Those beginning with N include:

- Nabla
- Nacophora
- Nadagara
- Nadagarodes
- Nannia
- Napocheima
- Napuca
- Narapa
- Narquena
- Narraga
- Narragodes
- Narragula
- Narthecusa
- Nassinia
- Nasusina
- Naxa
- Naxidia
- Nazca
- Neagathia
- Nearcha
- Nearthria
- Neazata
- Nebessa
- Nebula
- Necyopa
- Negla
- Negloides
- Nelo
- Nelopsis
- Nematocampa
- Nemeris
- Nemoria
- Neoalcis
- Neobalbis
- Neobapta
- Neoblasta
- Neochesias
- Neochorista
- Neochrysa
- Neocleora
- Neocolotois
- Neocrasis
- Neodesmodes
- Neodontopera
- Neodora
- Neofidonia
- Neognopharmia
- Neognophina
- Neogyne
- Neohipparchus
- Neolexia
- Neolissomma
- Neolythria
- Neomacaria
- Neonemoria
- Neopachrophila
- Neopaniasis
- Neopithecia
- Neopitthea
- Neopolita
- Neorumia
- Neoscelidia
- Neoselenia
- Neostega
- Neosterrha
- Neotaxia
- Neotephria
- Neoteristis
- Neoterpes
- Neothela
- Neotherina
- Neothysanis
- Neozuga
- Nepheloleuca
- Nephodia
- Nepitia
- Nepterotaea
- Nepytia
- Nereidania
- Neritodes
- Neromia
- Nesalcis
- Nesipola
- Nesochlide
- Neuralla
- Neuroanomala
- Neuromelia
- Neurophana
- Neuropolodes
- Neurotoca
- Niceteria
- Nigasa
- Nigriblephara
- Ninodes
- Niphonissa
- Nipponogelasma
- Nipteria
- Nisista
- Nolera
- Nomenia
- Nopia
- Noreia
- Norsia
- Nothabraxas
- Nothocasis
- Nothofidonia
- Notholoba
- Nothomiza
- Nothoporinia
- Nothoterpna
- Nothylemera
- Nothypsa
- Notiosterrha
- Notoreas
- Nucara
- Numia
- Nustidava
- Nychiodes
- Nycterephes
- Nycterosea
- Nycticleptes
- Nyctilampes
- Nyctiphanta
- Nyssia
- Nyssiodes
