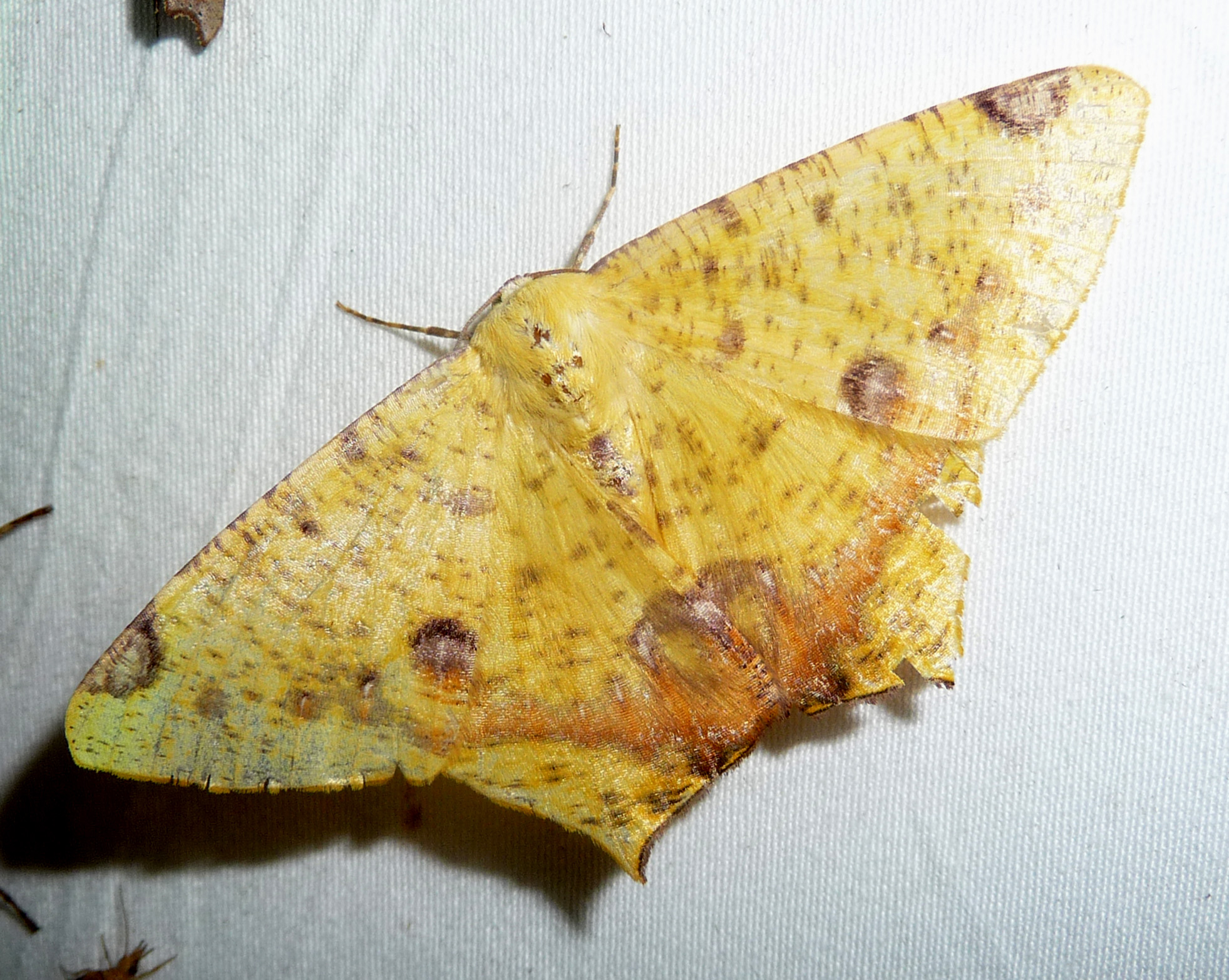

Scientific classification
- Kingdom: Animalia
- Phylum: Arthropoda
- Clade: Pancrustacea
- Class: Insecta
- Order: Lepidoptera
- Family: Geometridae
- Genus: Nepheloleuca
- Species: N. politia

Binomial name
- Nepheloleuca politia (Cramer, 1777)

= Nepheloleuca politia =

Species of moth

Nepheloleuca politia is a species of geometrid moth in the family Geometridae. It is found in the Caribbean Sea, Central America, and North America.
