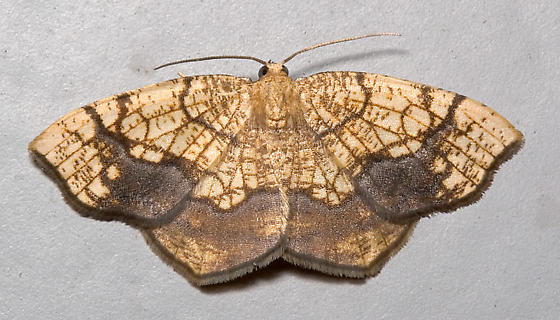

Scientific classification
- Domain: Eukaryota
- Kingdom: Animalia
- Phylum: Arthropoda
- Class: Insecta
- Order: Lepidoptera
- Family: Geometridae
- Genus: Nematocampa
- Species: N. resistaria

Binomial name
- Nematocampa resistaria Herrich-Schäffer, [1856]

Synonyms
- Eugonobapta brunneolineata Hulst, 1900; Nematocampa expunctaria Grote, 1872; Nematocampa filamentaria Guenée, [1858]; Ania limbaria chagnoni Swett, 1913; Phalaena limbata Haworth, 1809; Nematocampa orfordensis Cassino & Swett, 1922; Microgonia vestitaria Herrich-Schäffer, [1855]

= Nematocampa resistaria =

Species of moth

Nematocampa resistaria, the filament bearer, bordered thorn or horned spanworm moth, is a moth of the family Geometridae. The species was first described by Gottlieb August Wilhelm Herrich-Schäffer in 1856. It is found in North America from British Columbia to Nova Scotia, south to Florida and California.

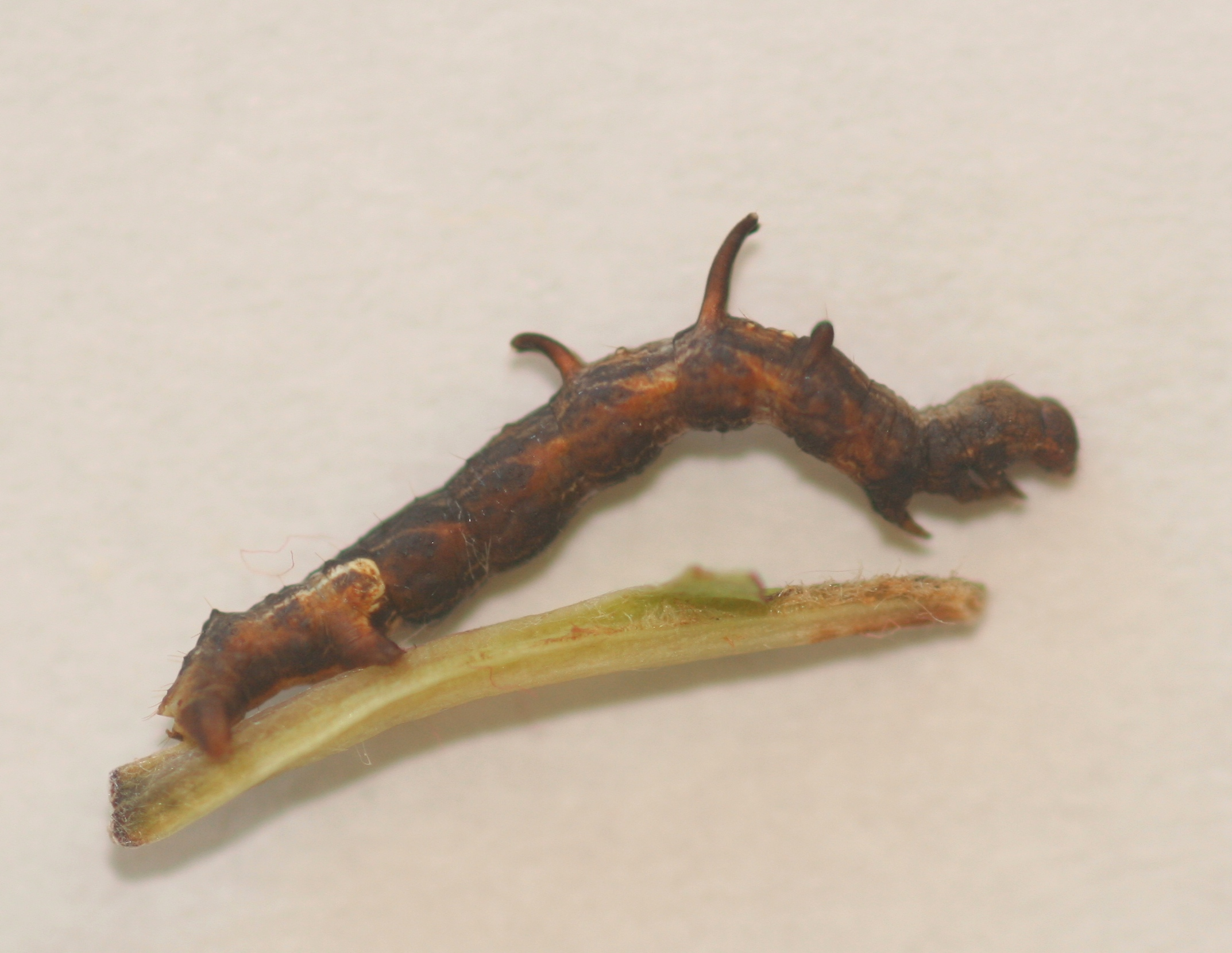
Caterpillar

This species was split from the Eurasian Nematocampa limbata.

The wingspan is 19–25 mm. Adults are on wing from May (or April in the deep south) to August. There is one generation in the north, two generations in the middle states and multiple generations in the southern part of the range.

Larvae feed on various deciduous and coniferous trees and shrubs, including Pseudotsuga, Tsuga, Abies, Picea, Salix, Betula papyrifera, Corylus, Fragaria and carrot (Daucus).
