= Plegapteryx prouti =

Scientific classification
- Kingdom: Animalia
- Phylum: Arthropoda
- Class: Insecta
- Order: Lepidoptera
- Family: Geometridae
- Genus: Plegapteryx
- Species: P. prouti

Binomial name
- Plegapteryx prouti (Bethune-Baker, 1927)

Synonyms
- Rhamphopteryx prouti Bethune-Baker, 1927

Species of moth

Plegapteryx prouti is a moth in the family Geometridae. It was described by George Thomas Bethune-Baker in 1927. It is found in Cameroon.

The wingspan is about 34 mm. Both wings are cinnamon brown, irrorated with fine dark points, which are more prominent in the somewhat paler hindwings. The forewings have a trace of an oblique stripe from the apex to the middle of the inner margin and the radial area has a small dark cloud and is slightly tinged with greenish.
