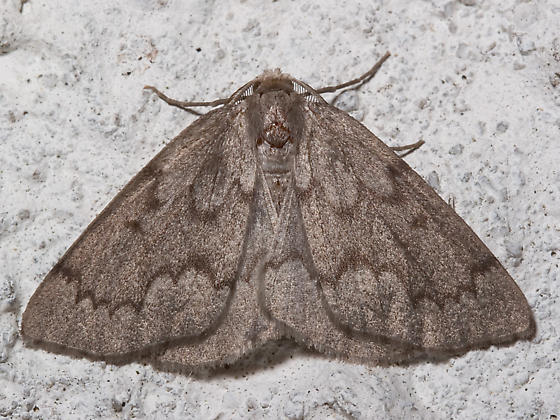

Scientific classification
- Kingdom: Animalia
- Phylum: Arthropoda
- Class: Insecta
- Order: Lepidoptera
- Family: Geometridae
- Genus: Nepytia
- Species: N. semiclusaria

Binomial name
- Nepytia semiclusaria (Walker, 1863)

Synonyms
- Nepytia fumosaria (Strecker, 1899)

= Nepytia semiclusaria =

Species of moth

Nepytia semiclusaria, the southern nepytia, is a moth of the family Geometridae.

The wingspan is about 36 mm. Adults are on the wing year round.

The larvae feed on Pinus species.
