= Nematocampa angulifera =

Scientific classification
- Kingdom: Animalia
- Phylum: Arthropoda
- Class: Insecta
- Order: Lepidoptera
- Family: Geometridae
- Genus: Nematocampa
- Species: N. angulifera

Binomial name
- Nematocampa angulifera Oberthür, 1883

Species of moth

Nematocampa angulifera is a species of moth of the geometer moth family. This species occurs in the Central and South American countries of Ecuador, Costa Rica, Colombia, Honduras, and Mexico.
