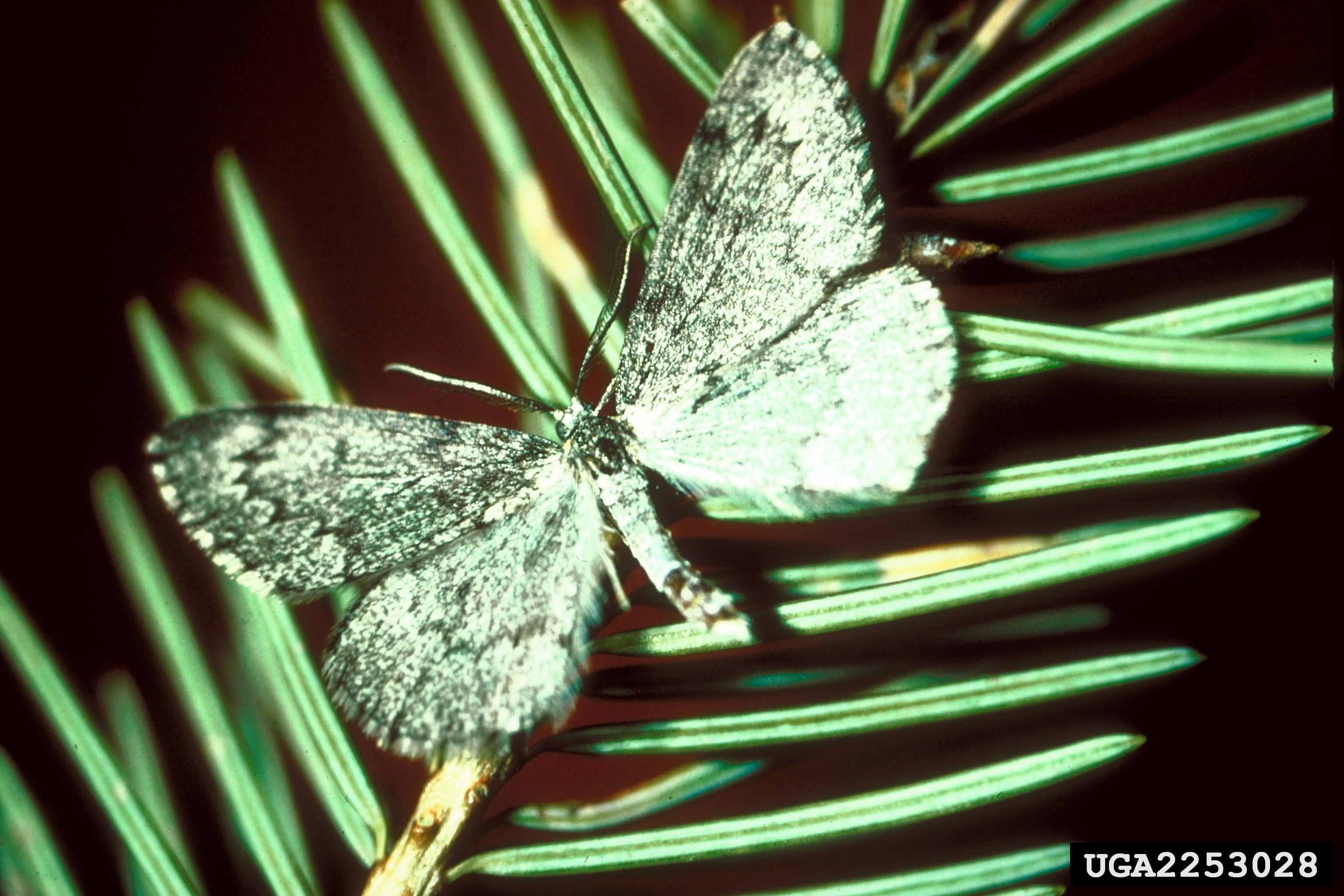

Scientific classification
- Kingdom: Animalia
- Phylum: Arthropoda
- Class: Insecta
- Order: Lepidoptera
- Family: Geometridae
- Genus: Nepytia
- Species: N. canosaria

Binomial name
- Nepytia canosaria Walker, 1863

Synonyms
- Nepytia pulchraria; Nepytia piniaria; Nepytia fuscaria

= Nepytia canosaria =

Species of moth

Nepytia canosaria, the false hemlock looper, is a moth of the family Geometridae. The species was first described by Francis Walker in 1863. It is found from southwest British Columbia east to Nova Scotia and Newfoundland, south through New England.

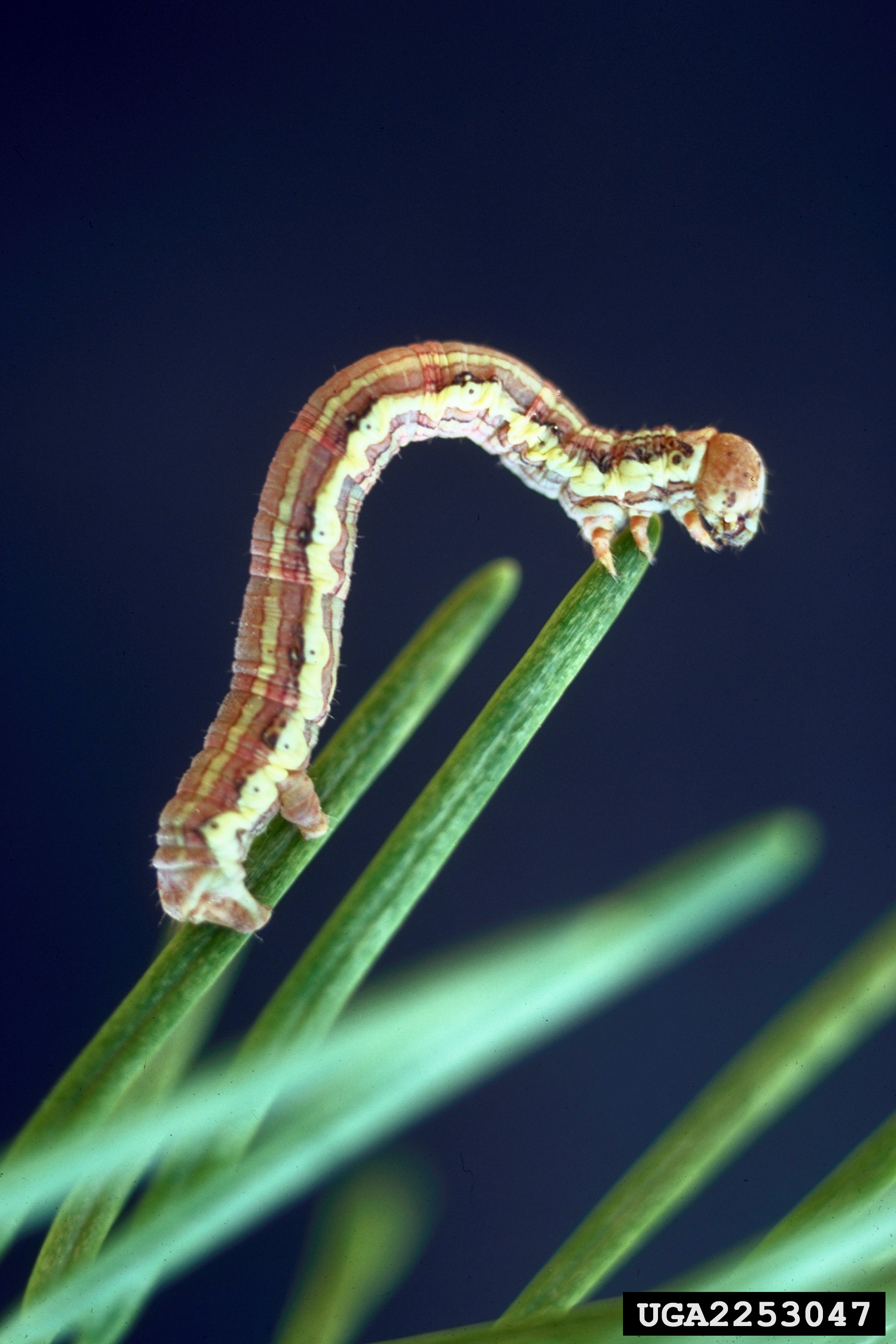
Caterpillar

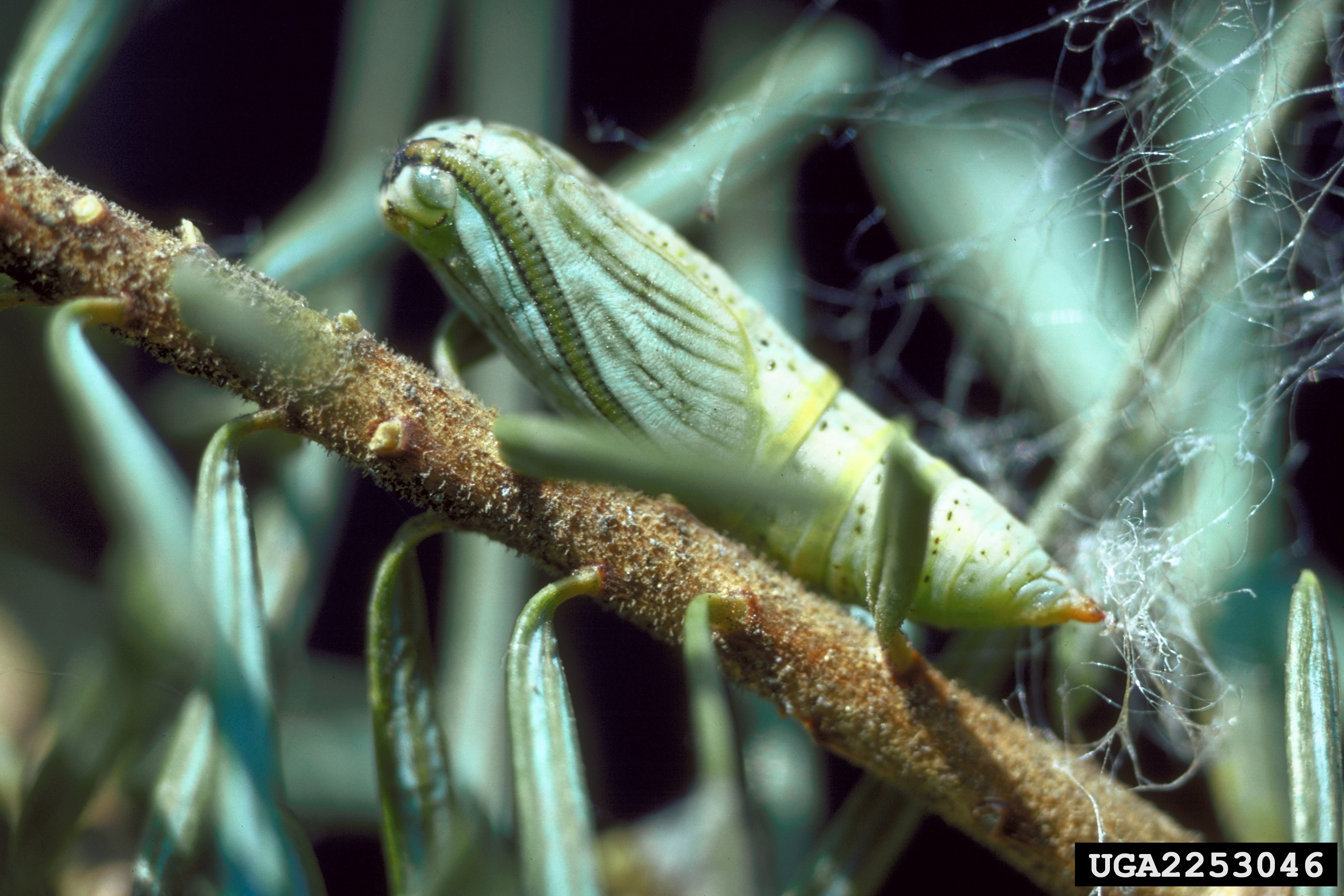
Pupa

The wingspan is about 30 mm. The moth flies from August to September depending on the location.

The larva feeds on balsam fir, eastern hemlock, spruces and occasionally other conifer species.
