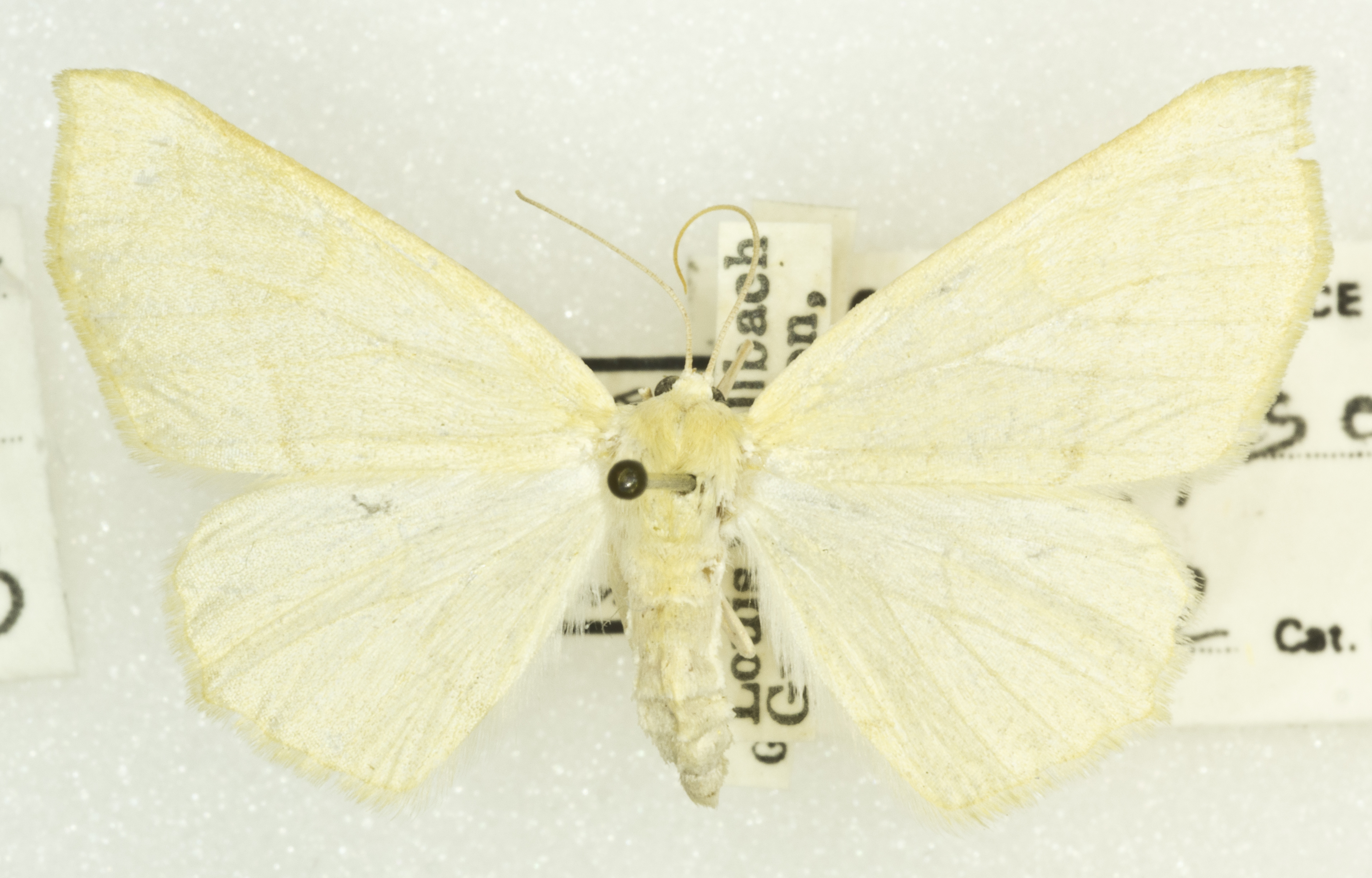

Scientific classification
- Kingdom: Animalia
- Phylum: Arthropoda
- Clade: Pancrustacea
- Class: Insecta
- Order: Lepidoptera
- Family: Geometridae
- Subfamily: Ennominae
- Tribe: Ourapterygini
- Genus: Neoterpes
- Species: N. ephelidaria

Binomial name
- Neoterpes ephelidaria (Hulst, 1886)

Synonyms
- Heterolocha ephelidaria Hulst, 1886; Neoterpes kunzei Hulst, 1898

= Neoterpes ephelidaria =

Species of moth

Neoterpes ephelidaria is a species of geometrid moth in the family Geometridae. It was described by George Duryea Hulst in 1886 and is found in North America.
