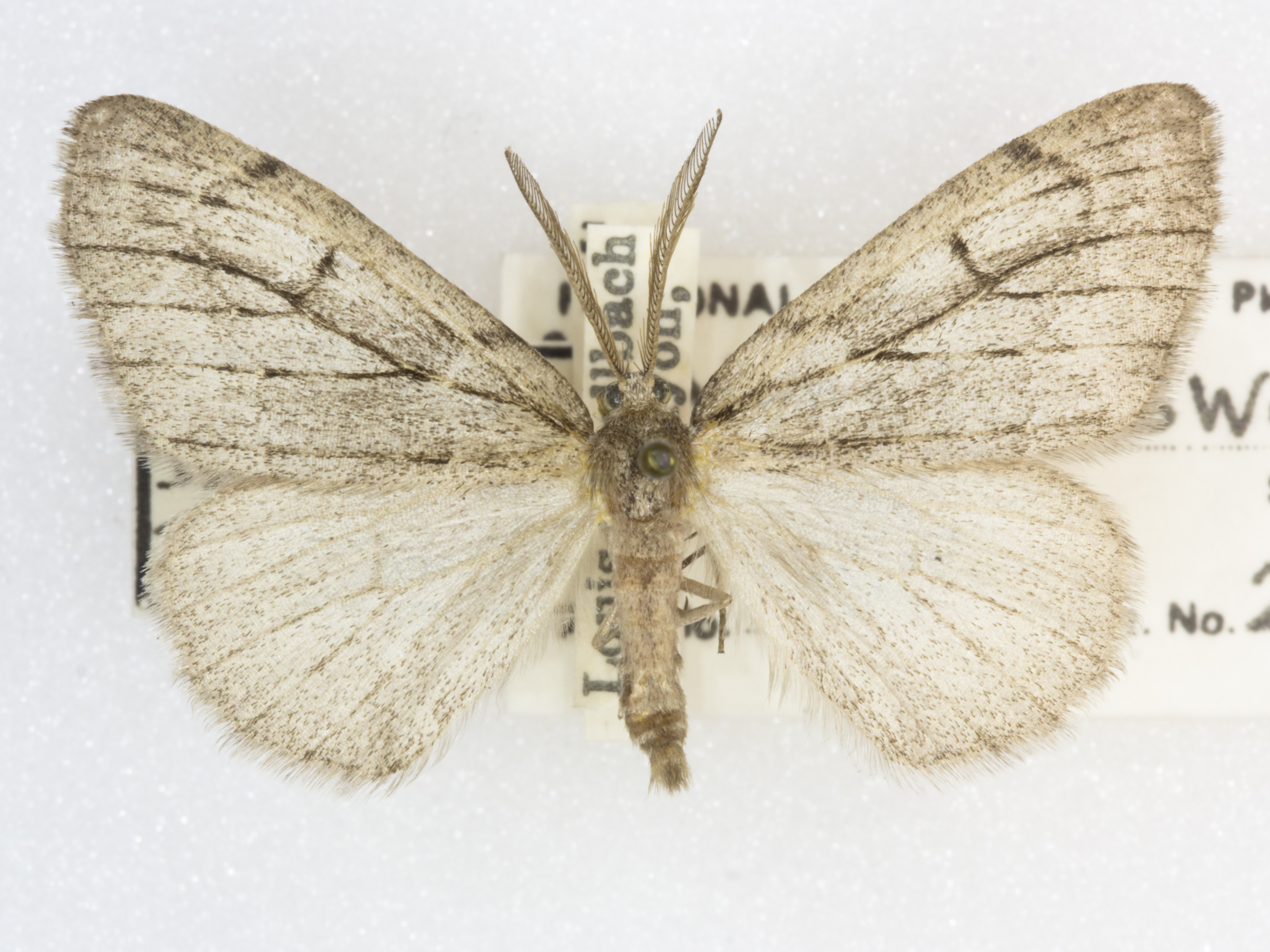

Scientific classification
- Kingdom: Animalia
- Phylum: Arthropoda
- Class: Insecta
- Order: Lepidoptera
- Family: Geometridae
- Genus: Nepytia
- Species: N. swetti

Binomial name
- Nepytia swetti Barnes & Benjamin, 1923

= Nepytia swetti =

Species of moth

Nepytia swetti is a species of moth in the family Geometridae first described by William Barnes and Foster Hendrickson Benjamin in 1923. It is found in North America.

The MONA or Hodges number for Nepytia swetti is 6905.
