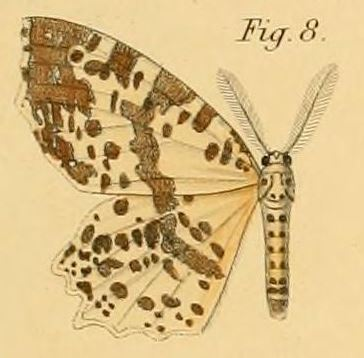
- Narthecusa tenuiorata ssp. nachtigalli

Scientific classification
- Kingdom: Animalia
- Phylum: Arthropoda
- Class: Insecta
- Order: Lepidoptera
- Family: Geometridae
- Genus: Narthecusa
- Species: N. tenuiorata

Binomial name
- Narthecusa tenuiorata Walker, 1862

Synonyms
- Endropia nachtigalii Dewitz, 1881; Negla iturina Bethune-Baker, 1909; Feronia zerenaria Mabille, 1879; Negla nudalla Bethune-Baker, 1913

= Narthecusa tenuiorata =

Species of moth

Narthecusa tenuiorata is a moth of the family Geometridae first described by Francis Walker in 1862. This species is found from Sierra Leone to Angola.

== Subspecies ==
- Narthecusa tenuiorata perspersa L. B. Prout, 1931 (Nigeria)
- Narthecusa tenuiorata zerenaria (Mabille, 1879) (Angola, Congo, Gabon)
- Narthecusa tenuiorata nudalla (Bethune-Baker, 1913) (Angola)
- Narthecusa tenuiorata melanthiata (Mabille, 1891) (Congo/Gabon)
- Narthecusa tenuiorata tenuiorata Walker, 1862 (Ghana, Gabon, Angola)
