= Nadagara vigaia =

Scientific classification
- Kingdom: Animalia
- Phylum: Arthropoda
- Clade: Pancrustacea
- Class: Insecta
- Order: Lepidoptera
- Family: Geometridae
- Genus: Nadagara
- Species: N. vigaia

Binomial name
- Nadagara vigaia Walker, 1862

Species of moth

Nadagara vigaia is a moth of the family Geometridae first described by the entomologist Francis Walker in 1862. It is found in Sri Lanka.
