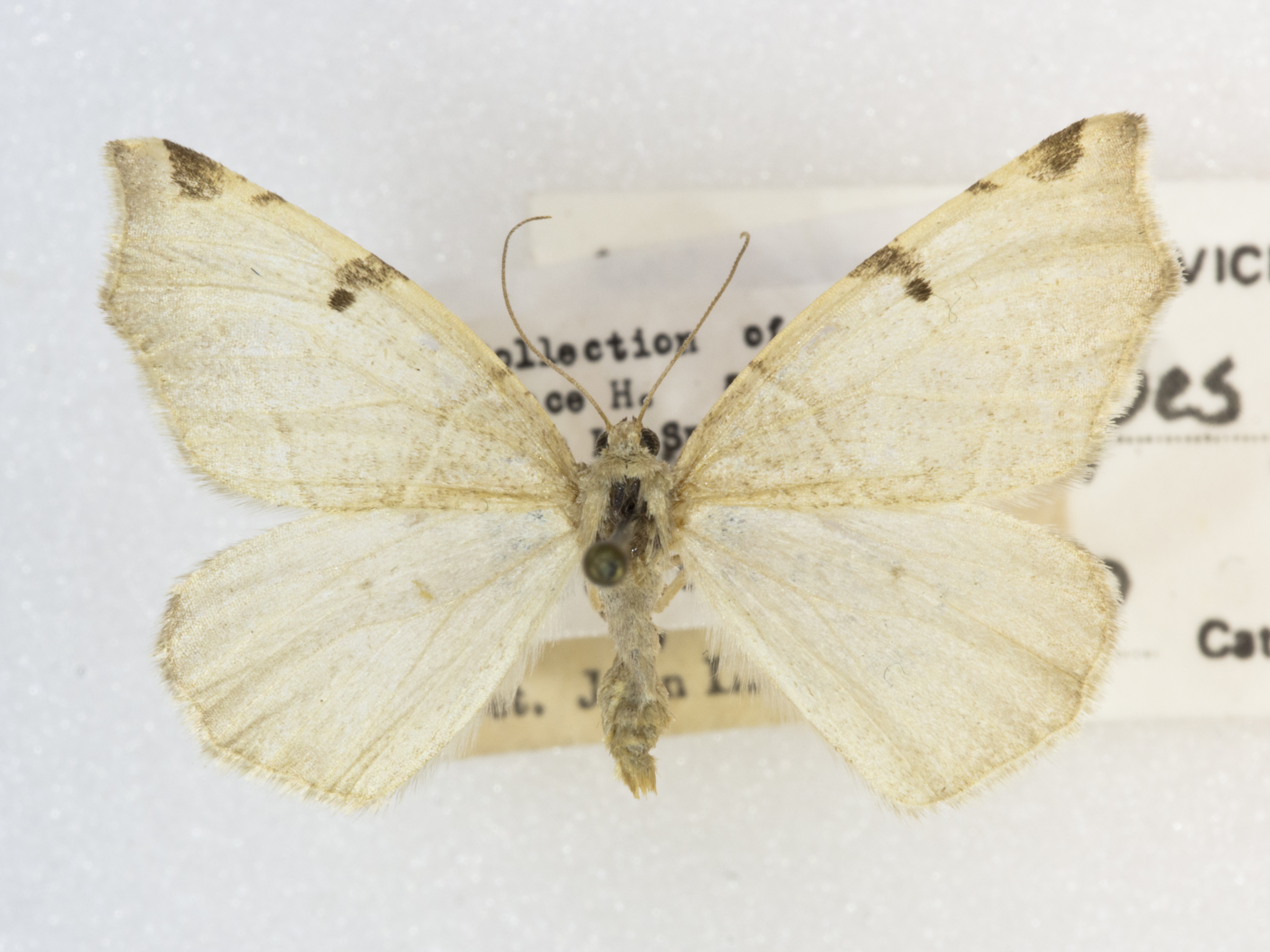

Scientific classification
- Domain: Eukaryota
- Kingdom: Animalia
- Phylum: Arthropoda
- Class: Insecta
- Order: Lepidoptera
- Family: Geometridae
- Tribe: Ourapterygini
- Genus: Neoterpes
- Species: N. graefiaria

Binomial name
- Neoterpes graefiaria (Hulst, 1887)

Synonyms
- Lozogramma graefiaria Hulst, 1887

= Neoterpes graefiaria =

Species of moth

Neoterpes graefiaria is a species of geometrid moth in the family Geometridae. It is found in North America.

The MONA or Hodges number for Neoterpes graefiaria is 6862.
