= Nematocampa amandaria =

Scientific classification
- Kingdom: Animalia
- Phylum: Arthropoda
- Clade: Pancrustacea
- Class: Insecta
- Order: Lepidoptera
- Superfamily: Geometroidea
- Family: Geometridae
- Subfamily: Ennominae
- Genus: Nematocampa
- Species: N. amandaria

Binomial name
- Nematocampa amandaria Guenée, 1858

Species of moth

Nematocampa amandaria is a species of moth of the Geometer moth subfamily Ennominae.
