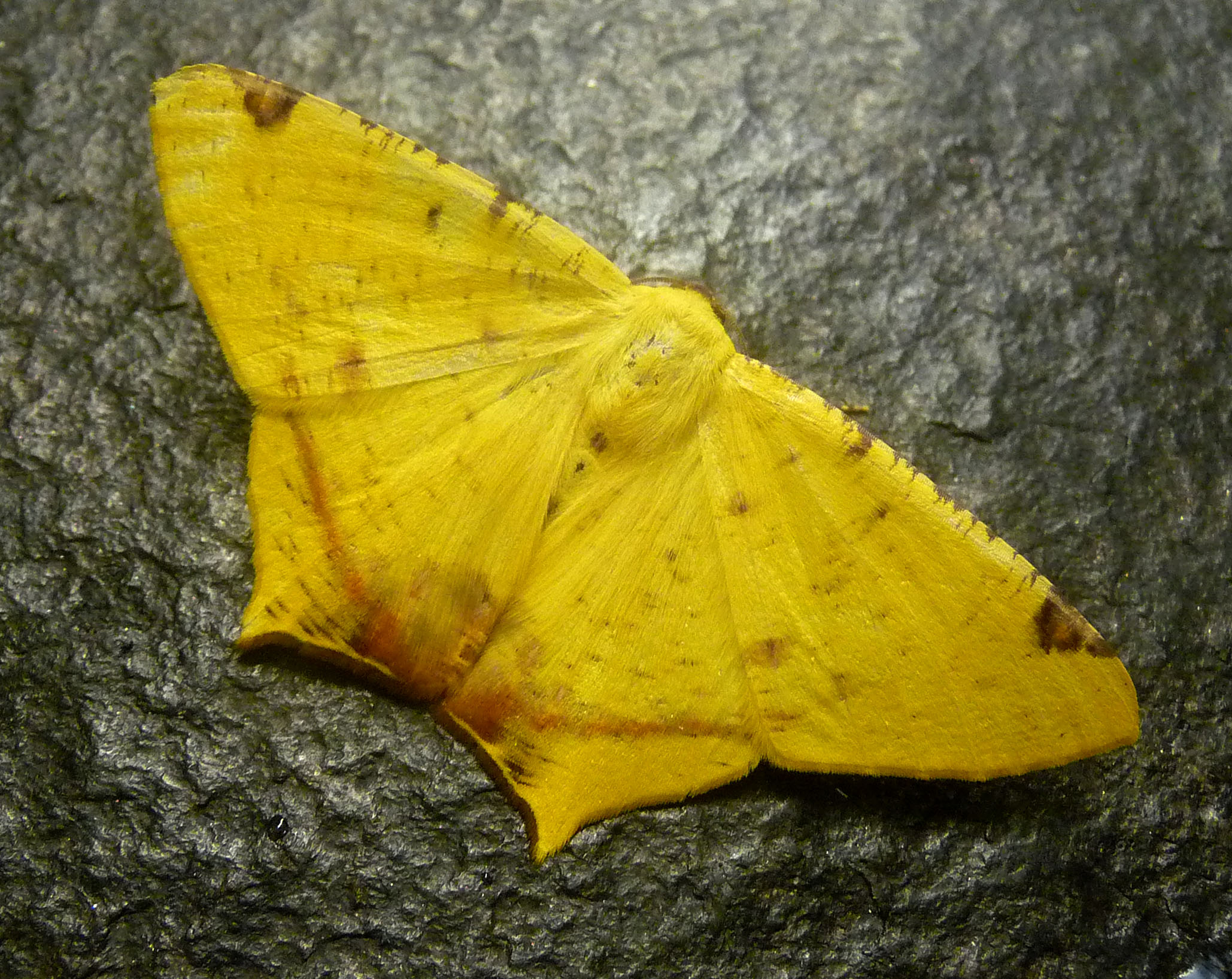

Scientific classification
- Kingdom: Animalia
- Phylum: Arthropoda
- Class: Insecta
- Order: Lepidoptera
- Family: Geometridae
- Genus: Nepheloleuca
- Species: N. complicata

Binomial name
- Nepheloleuca complicata (Guenee, 1858)

Synonyms
- Ourapteryx complicata Guenee, 1858; Nepheloleuca acuta Warren, 1897

= Nepheloleuca complicata =

Species of moth

Nepheloleuca complicata, the swallow-tailed moth, is a moth in the family Geometridae. It is found in Cuba, Jamaica and Haiti and from Panama to Peru. The habitat consists of lowland rainforests and mid-elevation cloudforests up to altitudes of about 1,800 metres.
