= Nematocampa baggettaria =

Scientific classification
- Domain: Eukaryota
- Kingdom: Animalia
- Phylum: Arthropoda
- Class: Insecta
- Order: Lepidoptera
- Family: Geometridae
- Genus: Nematocampa
- Species: N. baggettaria

Binomial name
- Nematocampa baggettaria Ferguson, 1993

Species of moth

Nematocampa baggettaria, or Baggett's spanworm moth, is a moth of the family Geometridae. It is found in Florida, Georgia, Louisiana and North Carolina.

The length of the forewings is 7–8 mm for males and 7–9 mm for females. Adults are on wing from April to September.
