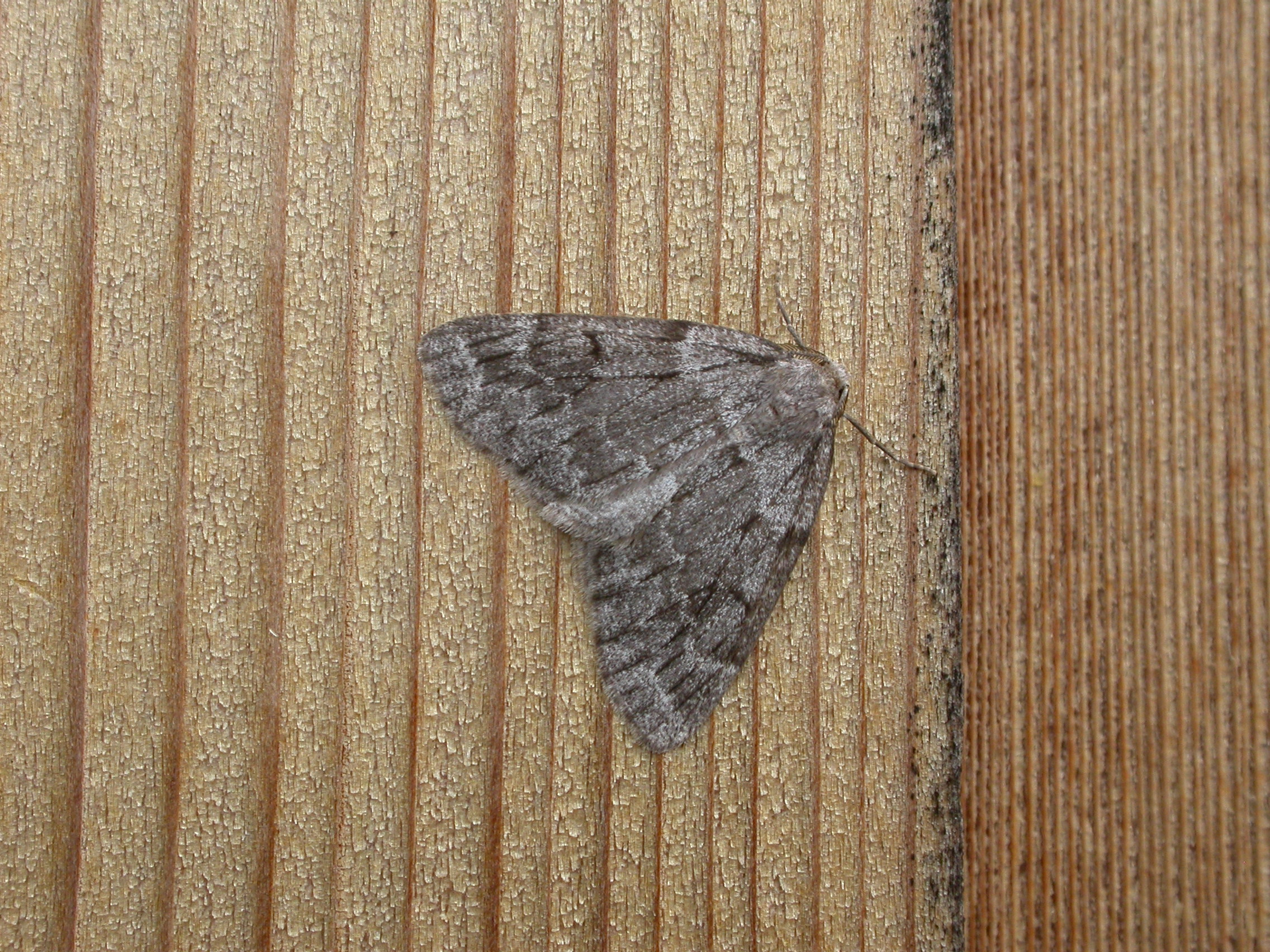

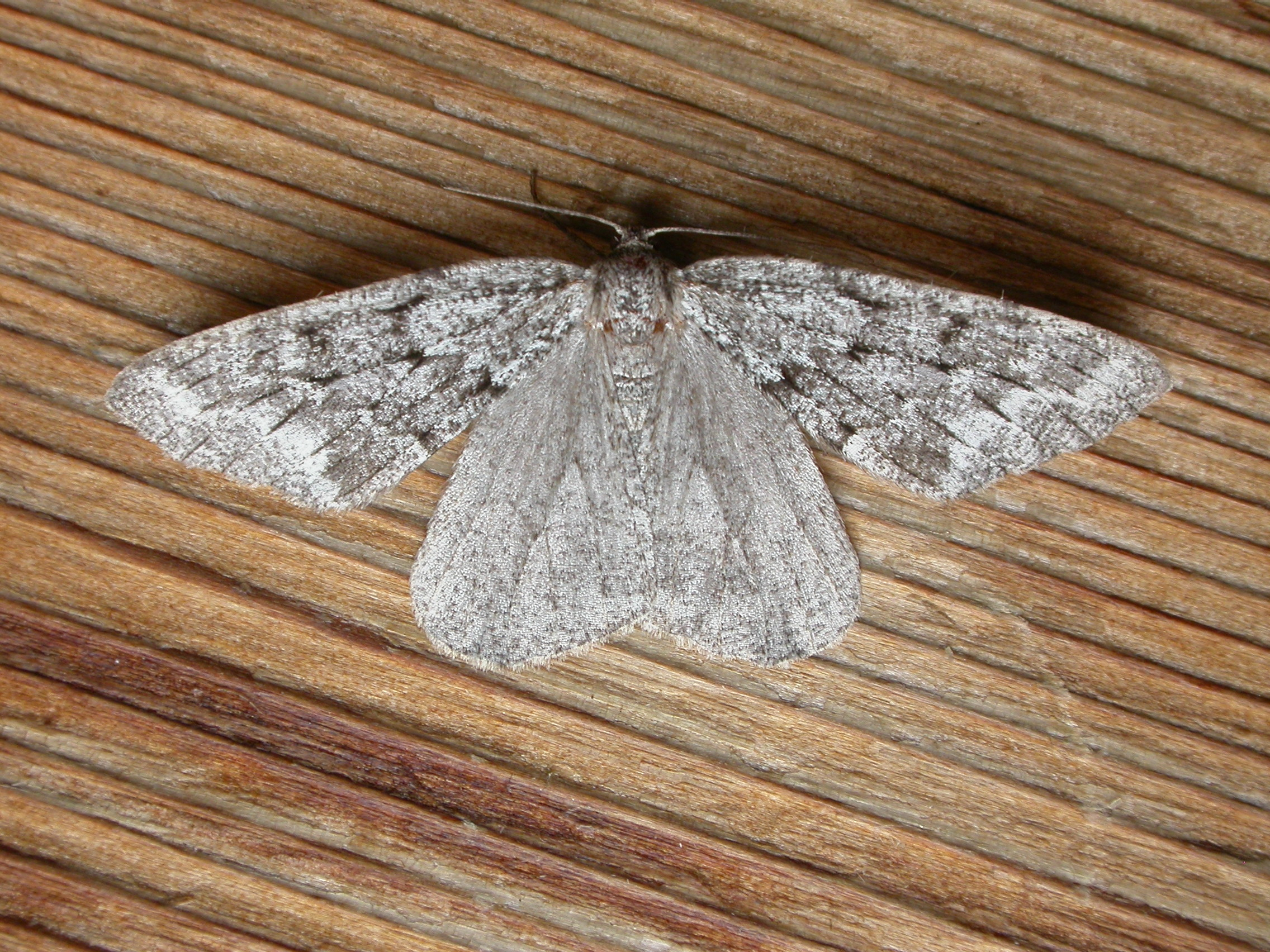

Scientific classification
- Kingdom: Animalia
- Phylum: Arthropoda
- Clade: Pancrustacea
- Class: Insecta
- Order: Lepidoptera
- Family: Geometridae
- Genus: Nepytia
- Species: N. umbrosaria

Binomial name
- Nepytia umbrosaria (Packard, 1873)

Synonyms
- Cleora umbrosaria Packard, 1873; Nepytia umbrosata Hulst, 1896; Cleora nigrovenaria Packard, 1876

= Nepytia umbrosaria =

Species of moth

Nepytia umbrosaria is a moth of the family Geometridae first described by Alpheus Spring Packard in 1873. It is found in North America, including Arizona, British Columbia, California, Oklahoma, Oregon and Washington.

The wingspan is about 33 mm. Adults are on wing from late July to early August.

The larvae feed on the foliage of Abies amabilis, Abies grandis, Pseudotsuga menziesii var. glauca and Tsuga heterophylla. Mature larvae reach a length of about 35 mm. The species overwinters as a mid-instar larva. Larvae feed from April to June. Pupation takes place in June.

== Subspecies ==
- Nepytia umbrosaria umbrosaria
- Nepytia umbrosaria nigrovenaria (Packard, 1876)
