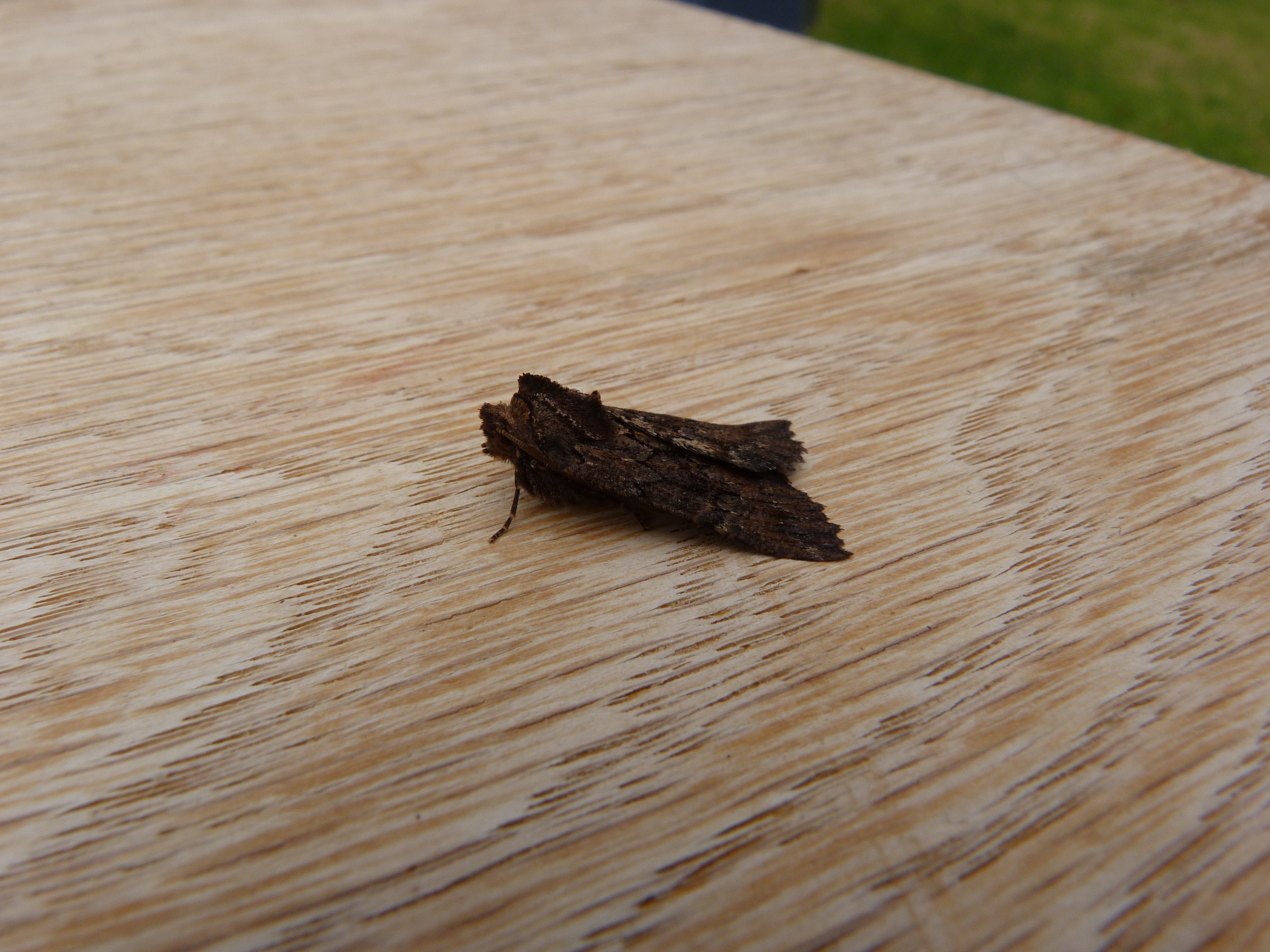

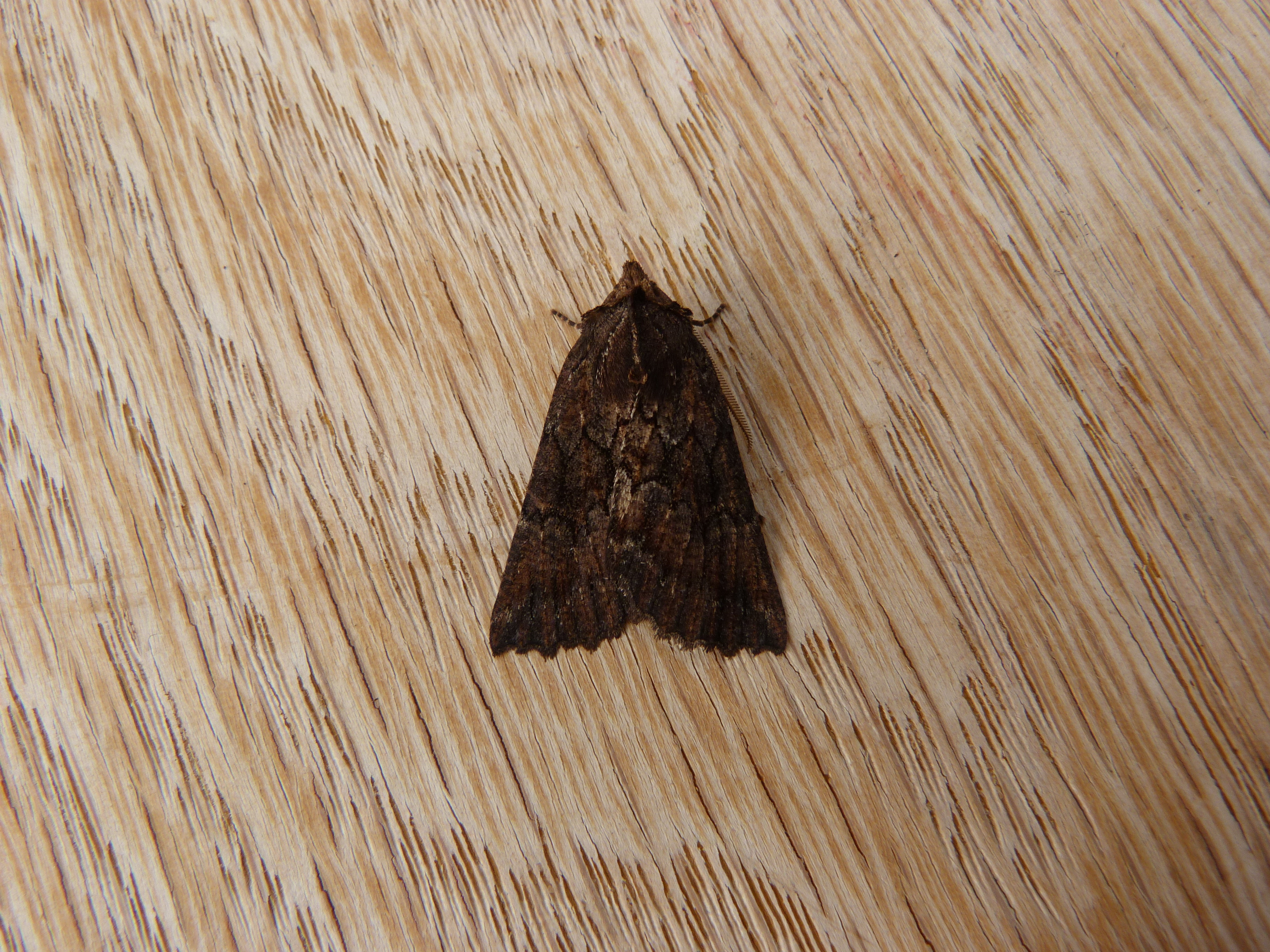

Scientific classification
- Kingdom: Animalia
- Phylum: Arthropoda
- Class: Insecta
- Order: Lepidoptera
- Family: Geometridae
- Genus: Nisista
- Species: N. serrata

Binomial name
- Nisista serrata (Walker, 1857)

Synonyms
- Xylina serrata Walker, 1857; Chlenias carburaria Guenée, 1857; Gastrina denticulata Swinhoe, 1900

= Nisista serrata =

Species of moth

Nisista serrata, the serrated crest-moth, is a species of moth of the family Geometridae first described by Francis Walker in 1857. It is found in Australia, including Tasmania, Victoria and South Australia.

The wingspan is about 50 mm.
