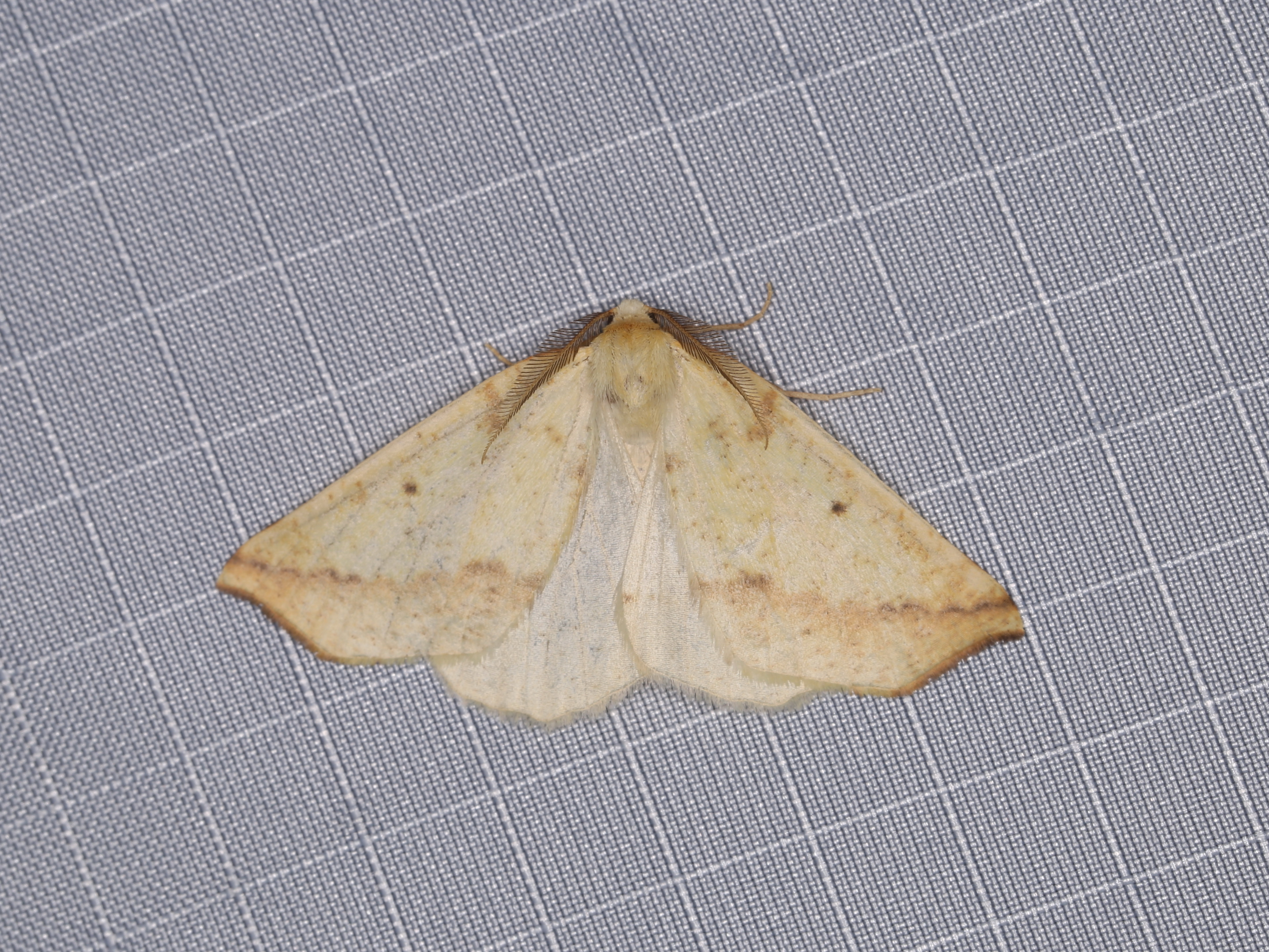

Scientific classification
- Kingdom: Animalia
- Phylum: Arthropoda
- Clade: Pancrustacea
- Class: Insecta
- Order: Lepidoptera
- Family: Geometridae
- Genus: Neoterpes
- Species: N. edwardsata

Binomial name
- Neoterpes edwardsata (Packard, 1871)

Synonyms
- Heterolocha edwardsata Packard, 1871

= Neoterpes edwardsata =

Species of moth

Neoterpes edwardsata is a species of geometrid moth in the family Geometridae. It is found in North America.
