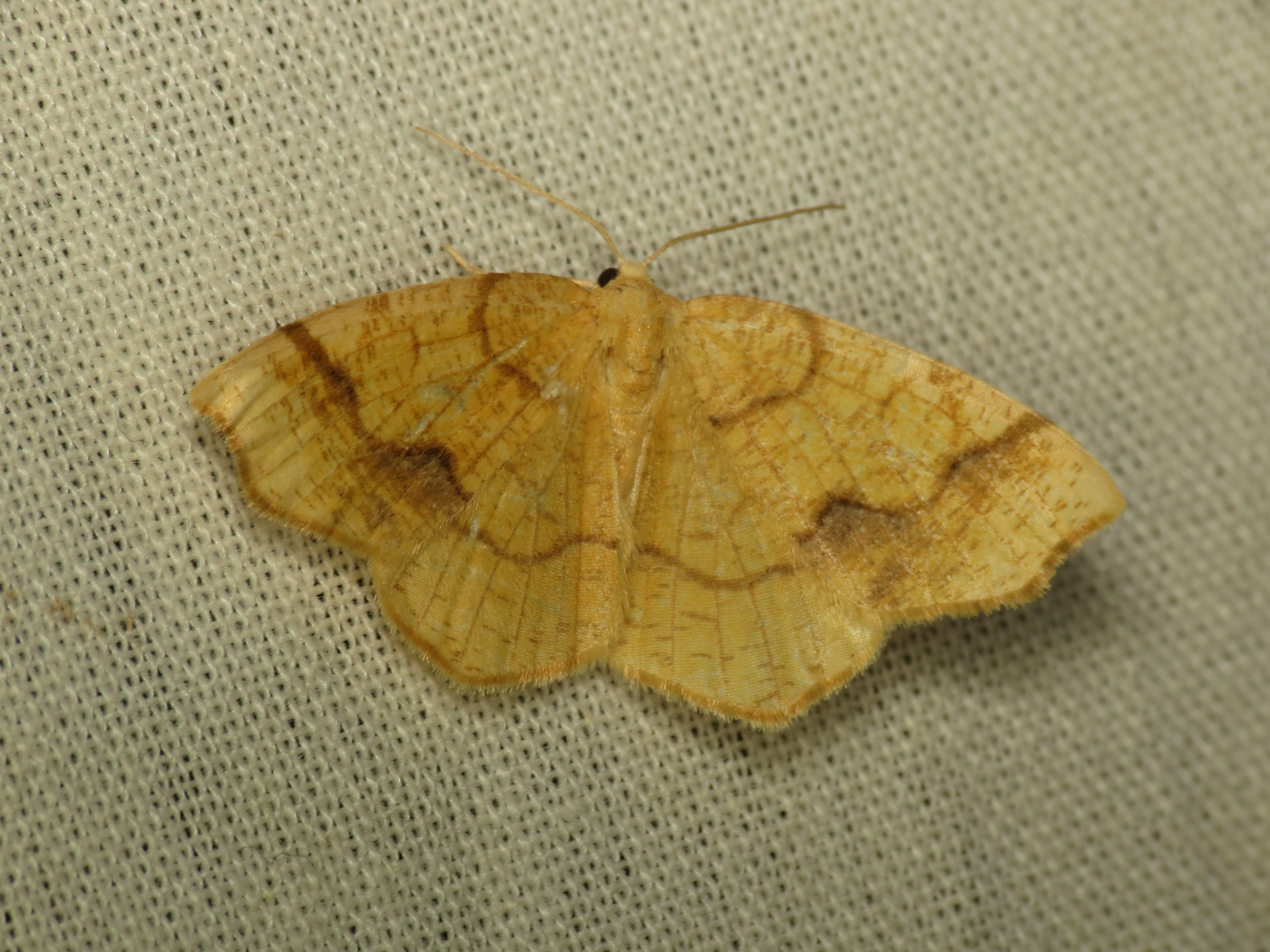

Scientific classification
- Domain: Eukaryota
- Kingdom: Animalia
- Phylum: Arthropoda
- Class: Insecta
- Order: Lepidoptera
- Family: Geometridae
- Genus: Nematocampa
- Species: N. brehmeata

Binomial name
- Nematocampa brehmeata (Grossbeck, 1907)

Synonyms
- Ania brehmeata Grossbeck, 1907

= Nematocampa brehmeata =

Species of moth

Nematocampa brehmeata is a moth of the family Geometridae. It is found in California.

The length of the forewings is 12–14 mm for males and 13–14 mm for females. Adults are on wing from June to August.
