= Nepytia lagunata =

Scientific classification
- Domain: Eukaryota
- Kingdom: Animalia
- Phylum: Arthropoda
- Class: Insecta
- Order: Lepidoptera
- Family: Geometridae
- Tribe: Ourapterygini
- Genus: Nepytia
- Species: N. lagunata

Binomial name
- Nepytia lagunata Cassino & Swett, 1923

Species of moth

Nepytia lagunata is a species of geometrid moth in the family Geometridae. It is found in North America.

The MONA or Hodges number for Nepytia lagunata is 6904.
