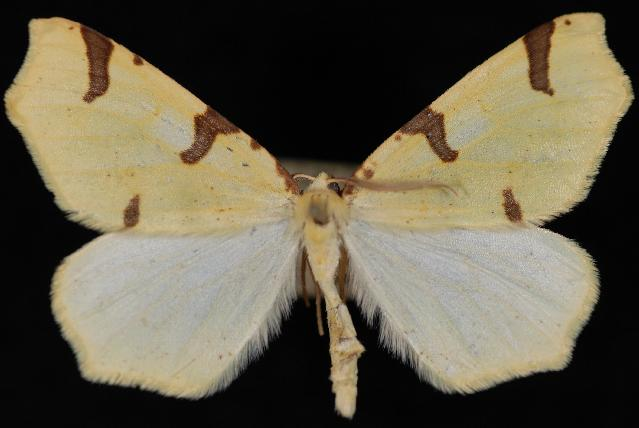

Scientific classification
- Kingdom: Animalia
- Phylum: Arthropoda
- Clade: Pancrustacea
- Class: Insecta
- Order: Lepidoptera
- Family: Geometridae
- Genus: Neoterpes
- Species: N. trianguliferata

Binomial name
- Neoterpes trianguliferata (Packard, 1871)

Synonyms
- Neoterpes trianguliferata costimacula Warren, 1901; Tetracis trianguliferaria notataria Hulst, 1886; Tetracis trianguliferata Packard, 1871

= Neoterpes trianguliferata =

Species of moth

Neoterpes trianguliferata, the canary thorn, is a moth in the family Geometridae. The species was first described by Alpheus Spring Packard in 1871. It is found in North America.

The MONA or Hodges number for Neoterpes trianguliferata is 6860.
