= Nepytia pellucidaria =

Scientific classification
- Domain: Eukaryota
- Kingdom: Animalia
- Phylum: Arthropoda
- Class: Insecta
- Order: Lepidoptera
- Family: Geometridae
- Genus: Nepytia
- Species: N. pellucidaria

Binomial name
- Nepytia pellucidaria Packard, 1873

Species of moth

Nepytia pellucidaria, commonly known as the false pine looper, is a moth of the family Geometridae. The species was first described by Alpheus Spring Packard in 1873. It is found in Canada (Nova Scotia, New Brunswick, Quebec and Ontario) and in the northeastern parts of the United States, including Maryland.

The wingspan of this moth is approximately 34–39 mm.

The larva feeds on pitch pine, red pine and possibly other hard pines.
