= Nepytia janetae =

Scientific classification
- Kingdom: Animalia
- Phylum: Arthropoda
- Class: Insecta
- Order: Lepidoptera
- Family: Geometridae
- Genus: Nepytia
- Species: N. janetae

Binomial name
- Nepytia janetae Rindge, 1967

Species of moth

Nepytia janetae is a species of moth in the family Geometridae (geometrid moths). It was described by Frederick H. Rindge in 1967 and is found in North America.

The MONA or Hodges number for Nepytia janetae is 6902.
