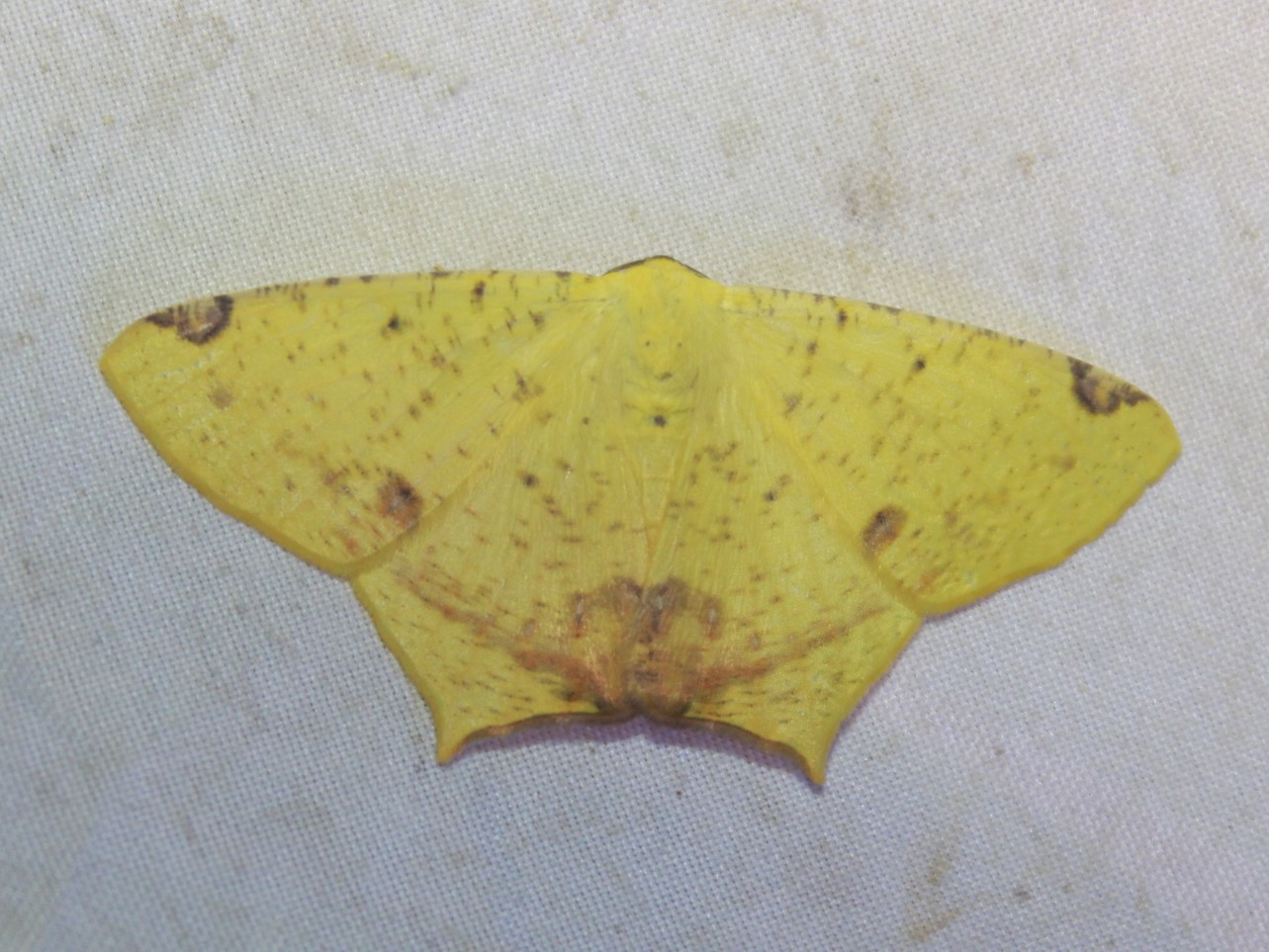

Scientific classification
- Kingdom: Animalia
- Phylum: Arthropoda
- Class: Insecta
- Order: Lepidoptera
- Family: Geometridae
- Genus: Nepheloleuca
- Species: N. floridata

Binomial name
- Nepheloleuca floridata (Grote, 1883)

Synonyms
- Ourapteryx floridata Grote, 1883

= Nepheloleuca floridata =

Species of moth

Nepheloleuca floridata is a species of geometrid moth in the family Geometridae. It is found in North America, where it has been recorded from the United States (Florida) and Mexico.
