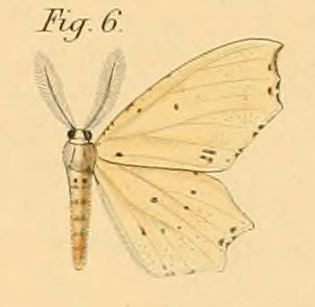

Scientific classification
- Kingdom: Animalia
- Phylum: Arthropoda
- Class: Insecta
- Order: Lepidoptera
- Family: Geometridae
- Genus: Narthecusa
- Species: N. perplexata

Binomial name
- Narthecusa perplexata (Walker, 1862)

Synonyms
- Endropia packardii Dewitz, 1881; Negla perplexata Walker, 1862

= Narthecusa perplexata =

Species of moth

Narthecusa perplexata is a moth of the family Geometridae first described by Francis Walker in 1862. This species is found from Guinea to Uganda.

== Subspecies ==
- Narthecusa perplexata perplexata (Walker, 1862)
- Narthecusa perplexata ugandensis L. B. Prout, 1926 (Uganda)
