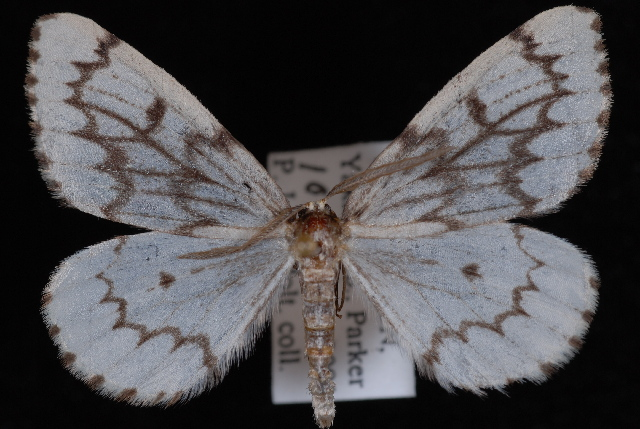

Scientific classification
- Kingdom: Animalia
- Phylum: Arthropoda
- Class: Insecta
- Order: Lepidoptera
- Family: Geometridae
- Genus: Nepytia
- Species: N. phantasmaria

Binomial name
- Nepytia phantasmaria (Strecker, 1899)

Synonyms
- Cleora phantasmaria Strecker, 1899

= Nepytia phantasmaria =

Species of moth

Nepytia phantasmaria, the phantom hemlock looper, is a species of geometrid moth in the family Geometridae. It was described by Herman Strecker in 1899 and is found in North America.

The MONA or Hodges number for Nepytia phantasmaria is 6907.
