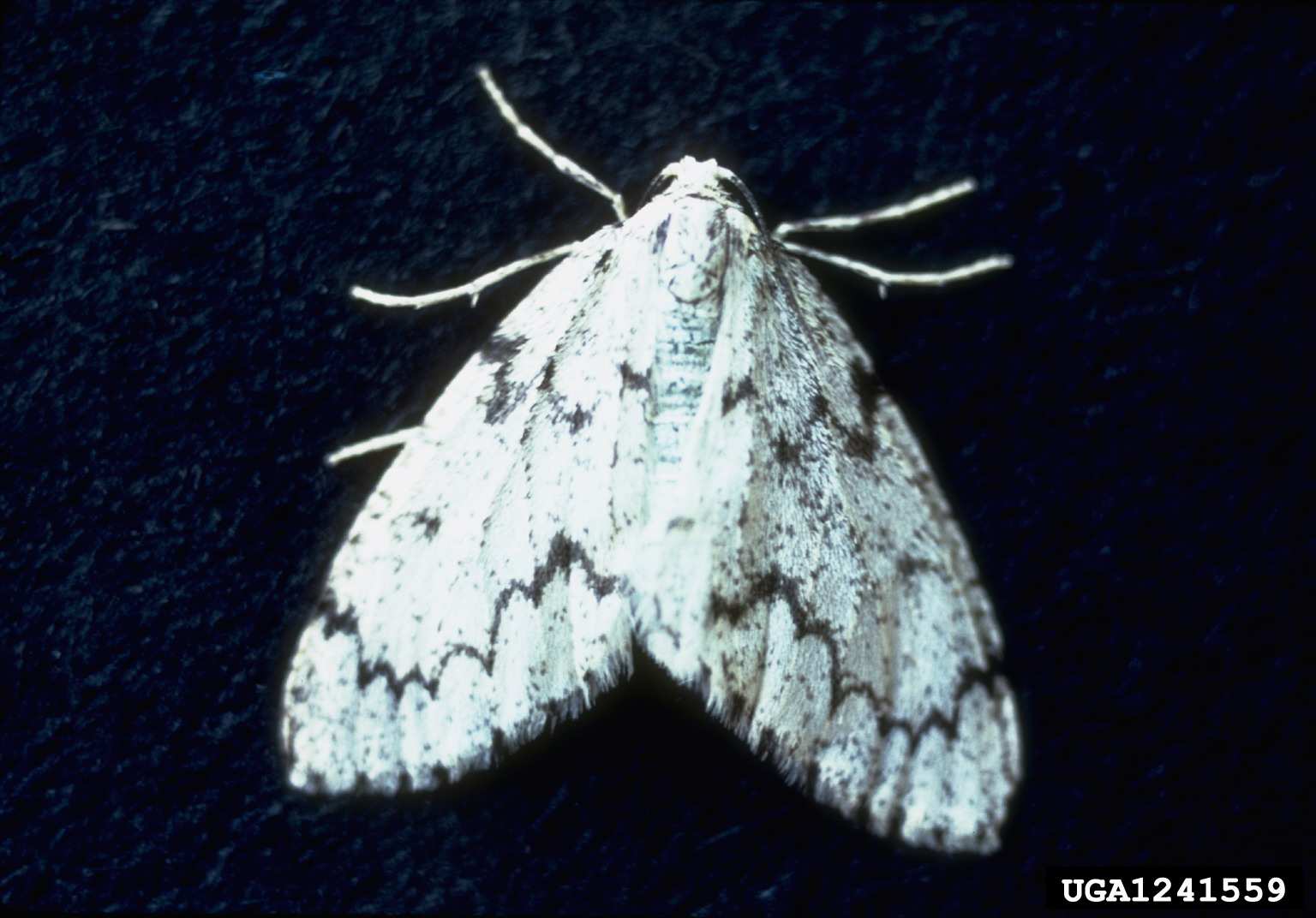

Scientific classification
- Domain: Eukaryota
- Kingdom: Animalia
- Phylum: Arthropoda
- Class: Insecta
- Order: Lepidoptera
- Family: Geometridae
- Genus: Nepytia
- Species: N. freemani

Binomial name
- Nepytia freemani Munroe, 1963

= Nepytia freemani =

Species of moth

Nepytia freemani, the western false hemlock looper, is a moth of the family Geometridae. The species was first described by Eugene G. Munroe in 1963. It is found in North America from southern British Columbia and extreme southwestern Alberta south to Washington, Idaho, Montana and Utah.

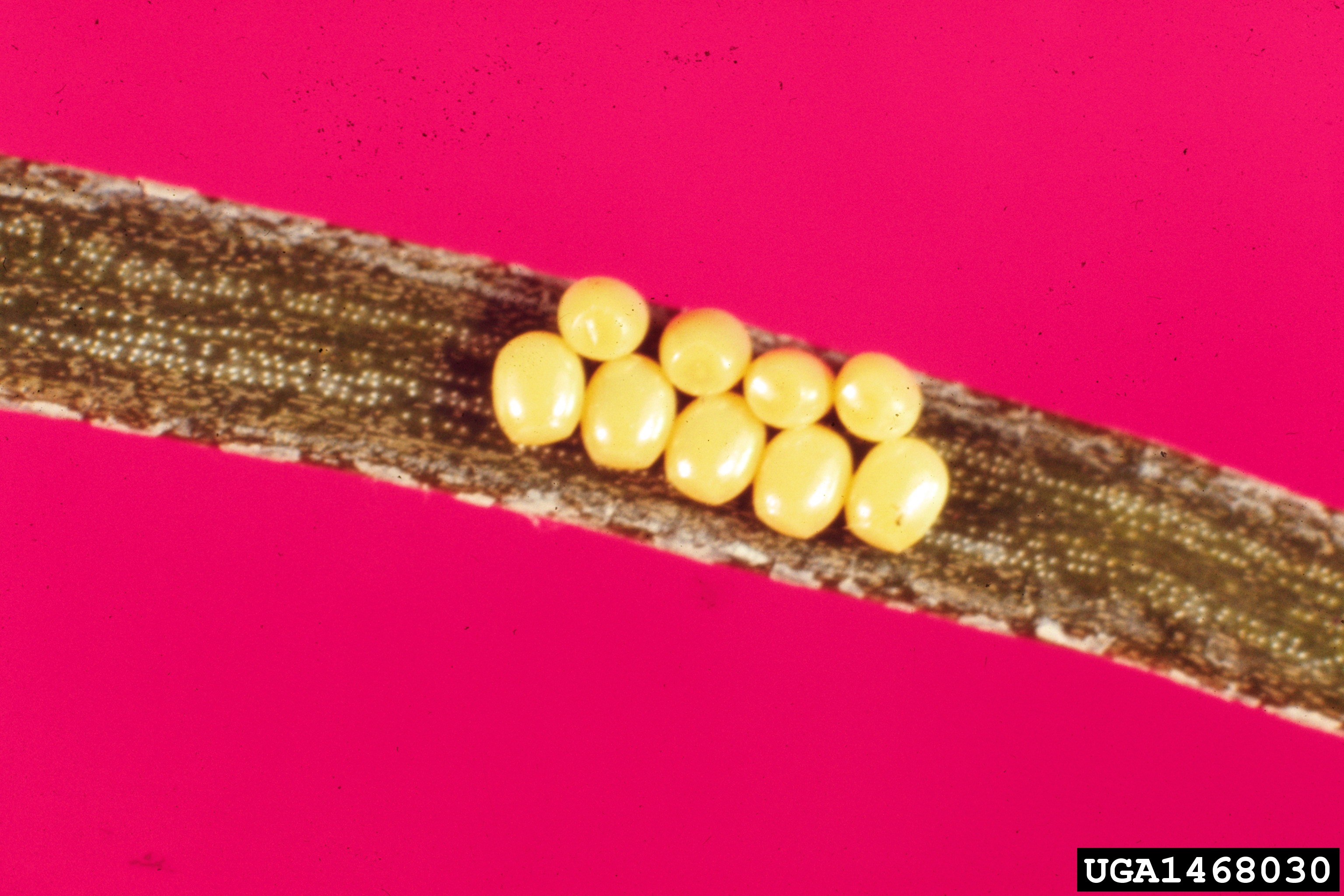
Eggs

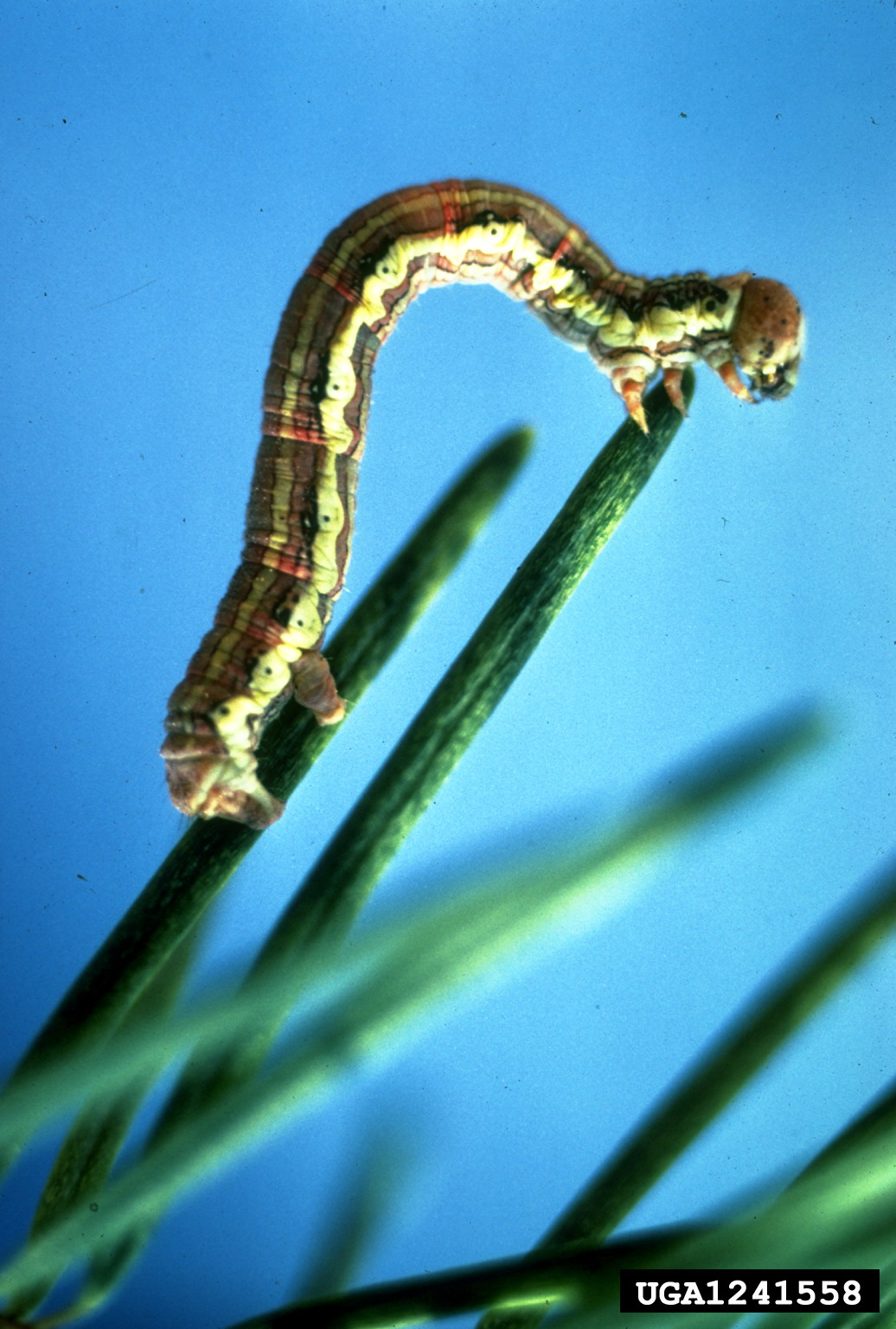
Caterpillar

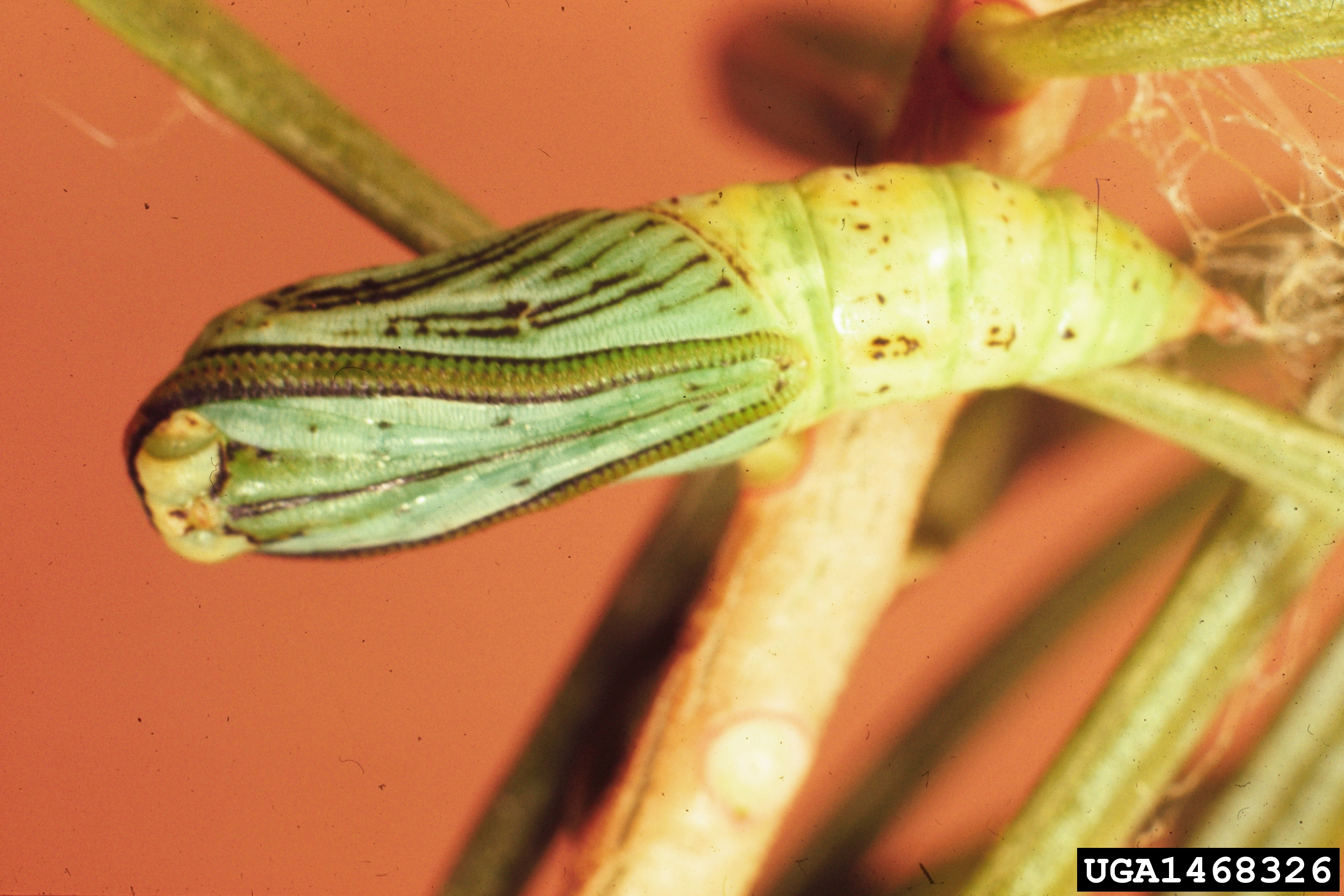
Pupa

The wingspan is about 21 mm. The moth flies from August to October depending on the location.

The larva feeds on various conifers.
