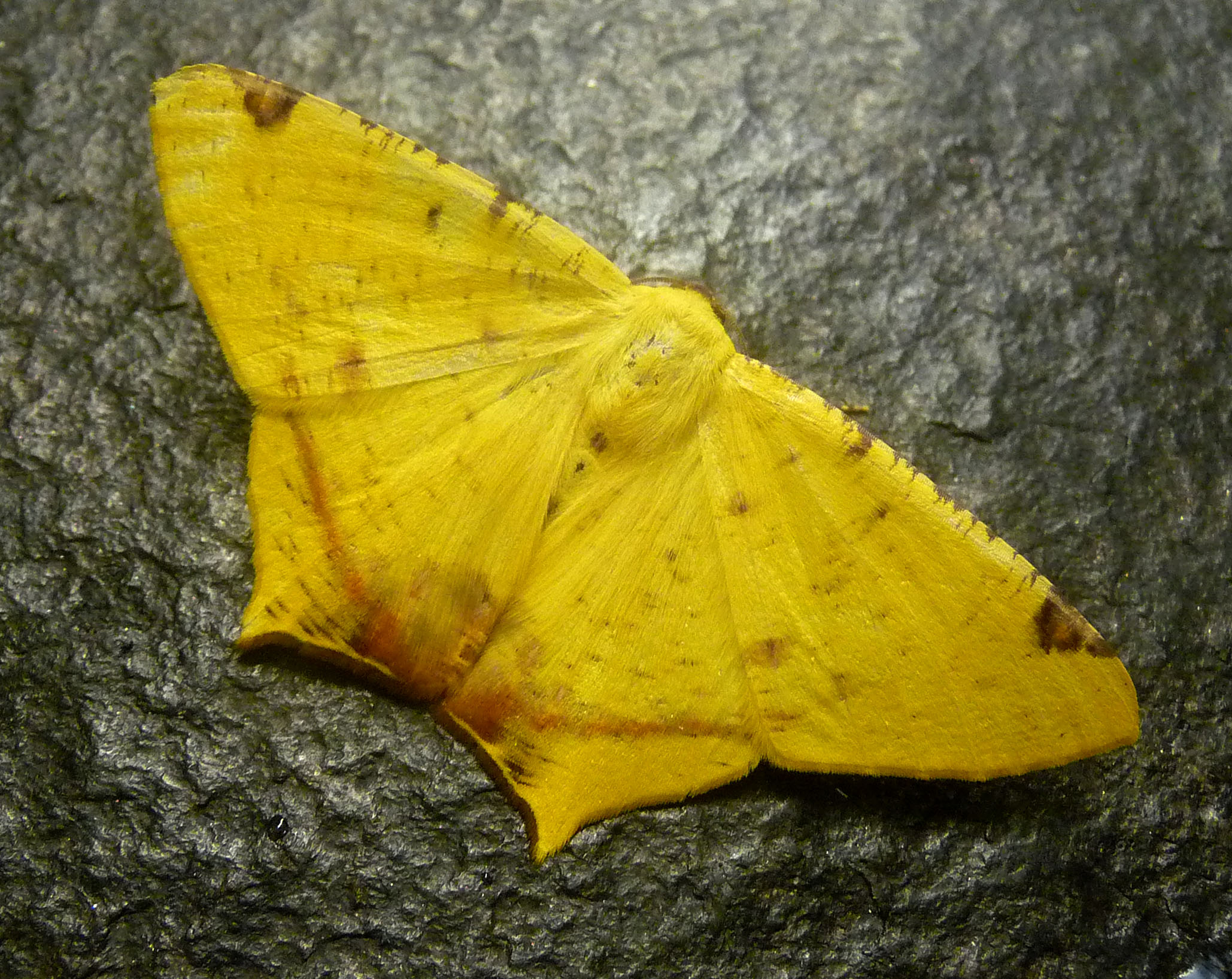
- Nepheloleuca complicata

Scientific classification
- Domain: Eukaryota
- Kingdom: Animalia
- Phylum: Arthropoda
- Class: Insecta
- Order: Lepidoptera
- Family: Geometridae
- Subfamily: Ennominae
- Tribe: Ourapterygini
- Genus: Nepheloleuca; Butler, 1883

= Nepheloleuca =

Genus of moths

Nepheloleuca, is a genus of moths in the family Geometridae erected by Arthur Gardiner Butler in 1883. The genus includes twelve species, similar in appearance, yet different in ground color and with minor variations in markings. Nepheloleuca species occur on the Caribbean islands of Haiti, Cuba and Jamaica, but also on mainland South America.

== Selected species ==
- Nepheloleuca absentimacula Warren, 1900
- Nepheloleuca complicata (Guenee, 1858)
- Nepheloleuca floridata (Grote, 1883)
- Nepheloleuca peruviana Herbulot, 2002
- Nepheloleuca politia (Cramer, 1777)
- Nepheloleuca semiplaga Warren, 1894
