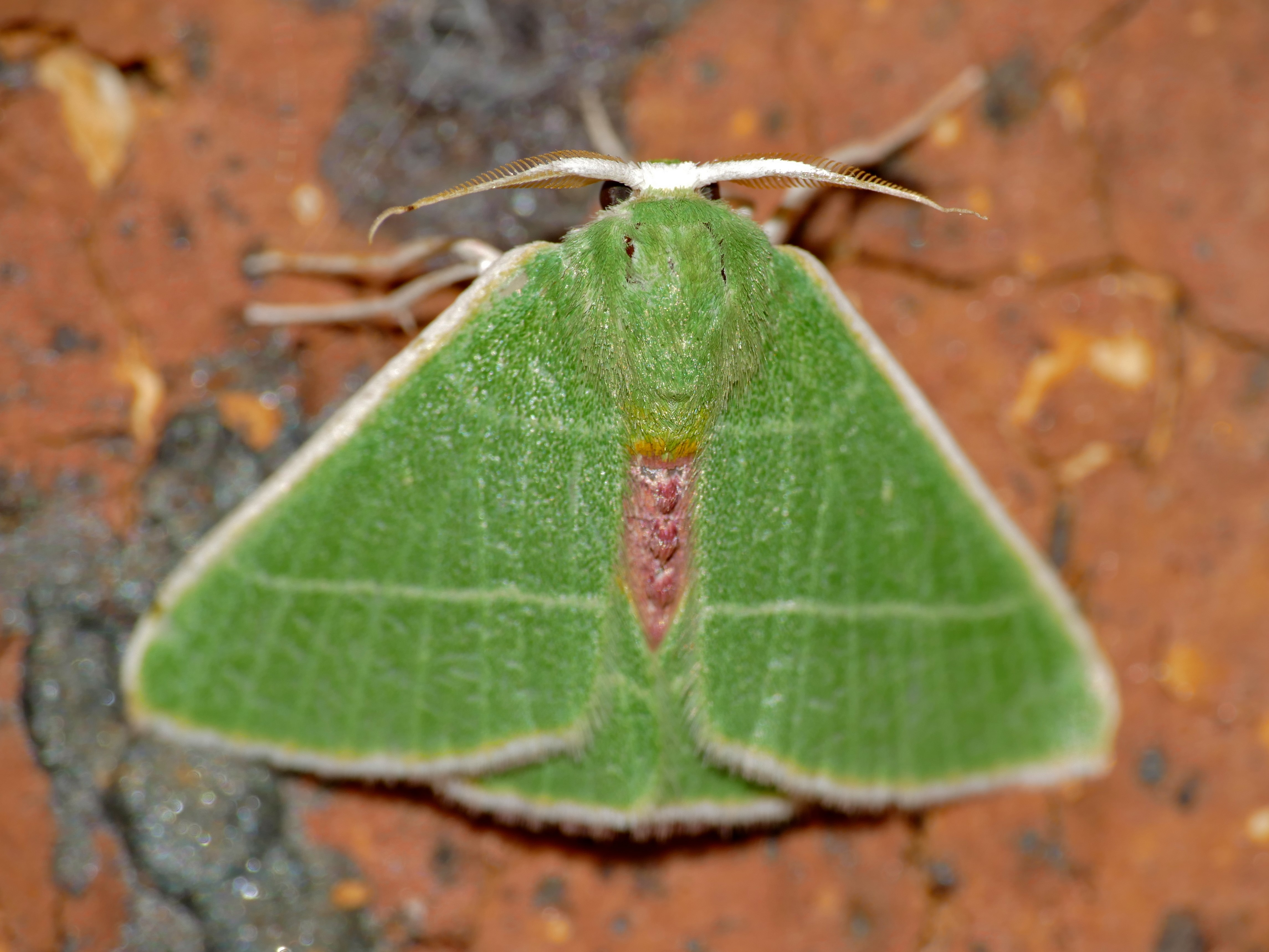
- Neurotoca endorhoda

Scientific classification
- Domain: Eukaryota
- Kingdom: Animalia
- Phylum: Arthropoda
- Class: Insecta
- Order: Lepidoptera
- Family: Geometridae
- Subfamily: Geometrinae
- Genus: Neurotoca; Warren, 1897

= Neurotoca =

Genus of moths

Neurotoca is a genus of moths in the family Geometridae described by Warren in 1897.

== Species ==
- Neurotoca endorhoda Hampson, 1910
- Neurotoca notata Warren, 1897
