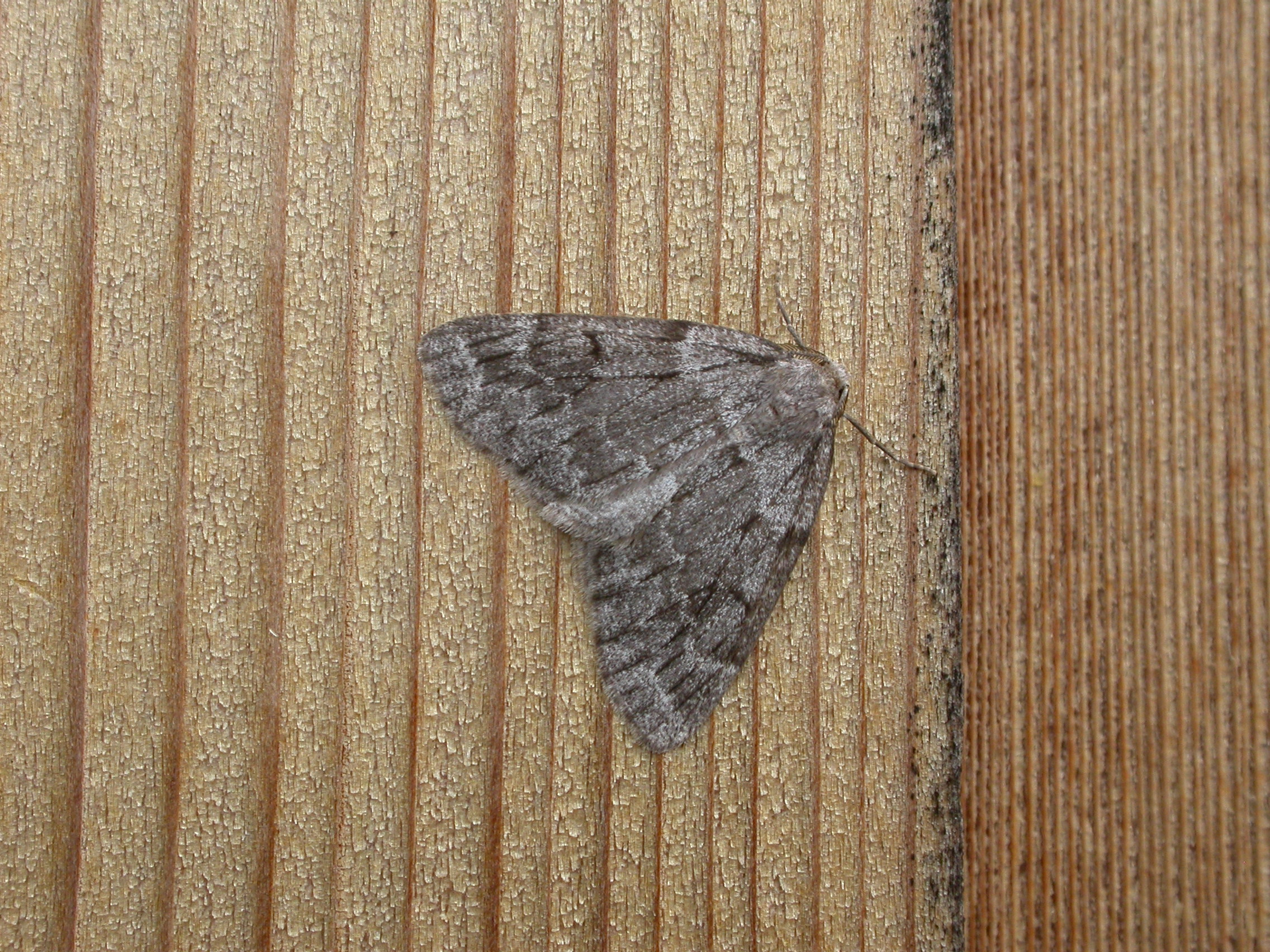
- Nepytia umbrosaria

Scientific classification
- Domain: Eukaryota
- Kingdom: Animalia
- Phylum: Arthropoda
- Class: Insecta
- Order: Lepidoptera
- Family: Geometridae
- Tribe: Ourapterygini
- Genus: Nepytia; Hulst, 1896

= Nepytia =

Genus of moths

Nepytia is a genus of moths in the family Geometridae first described by George Duryea Hulst in 1896.

== Species ==
- Nepytia canosaria (Walker, 1863) - false hemlock looper
- Nepytia disputata McDunnough, 1940
- Nepytia freemani Munroe, 1963 - western false hemlock looper
- Nepytia janetae Rindge, 1967
- Nepytia juabata Cassino & Swett, 1922
- Nepytia lagunata Cassino & Swett, 1923
- Nepytia mariaria (Schaus, 1923)
- Nepytia pellucidaria (Packard, 1873) - false pine looper
- Nepytia phantasmaria (Strecker, 1899)
- Nepytia regulata Barnes & McDunnough, 1916
- Nepytia semiclusaria (Walker, 1863)
- Nepytia swetti Barnes & Benjamin, 1923
- Nepytia umbrosaria (Packard, 1873)
