= Negloides =

Scientific classification
- Kingdom: Animalia
- Phylum: Arthropoda
- Clade: Pancrustacea
- Class: Insecta
- Order: Lepidoptera
- Family: Geometridae
- Genus: Negloides; Prout, 1931
- Species: N. oceanitis

Binomial name
- Negloides oceanitis Prout, 1931

Genus of moths

Negloides is a monotypic moth genus in the family Geometridae. Its only species, Negloides oceanitis, is known from Madagascar. Both the genus and species were described by Prout in 1931.
