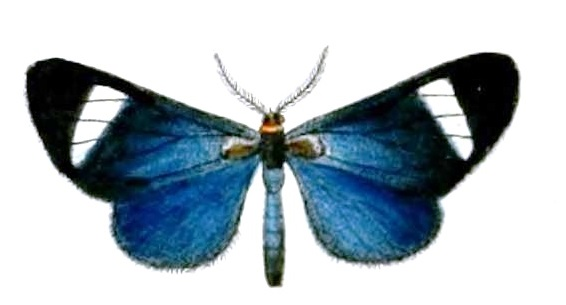

Scientific classification
- Kingdom: Animalia
- Phylum: Arthropoda
- Class: Insecta
- Order: Lepidoptera
- Family: Geometridae
- Subfamily: Ennominae
- Genus: Neopaniasis; Rapp, 1945
- Species: N. aleopetra

Binomial name
- Neopaniasis aleopetra (Druce, 1890)

Synonyms
- Paniasis Druce 1890 (preocc.); Paniasis aleopetra Druce 1890; Melanchroia tritoniaria Schaus 1913

= Neopaniasis =

Genus of moths

Neopaniasis is a genus of moths in the family Geometridae. It contains only one species, Neopaniasis aleopetra, which is found in Colombia.
