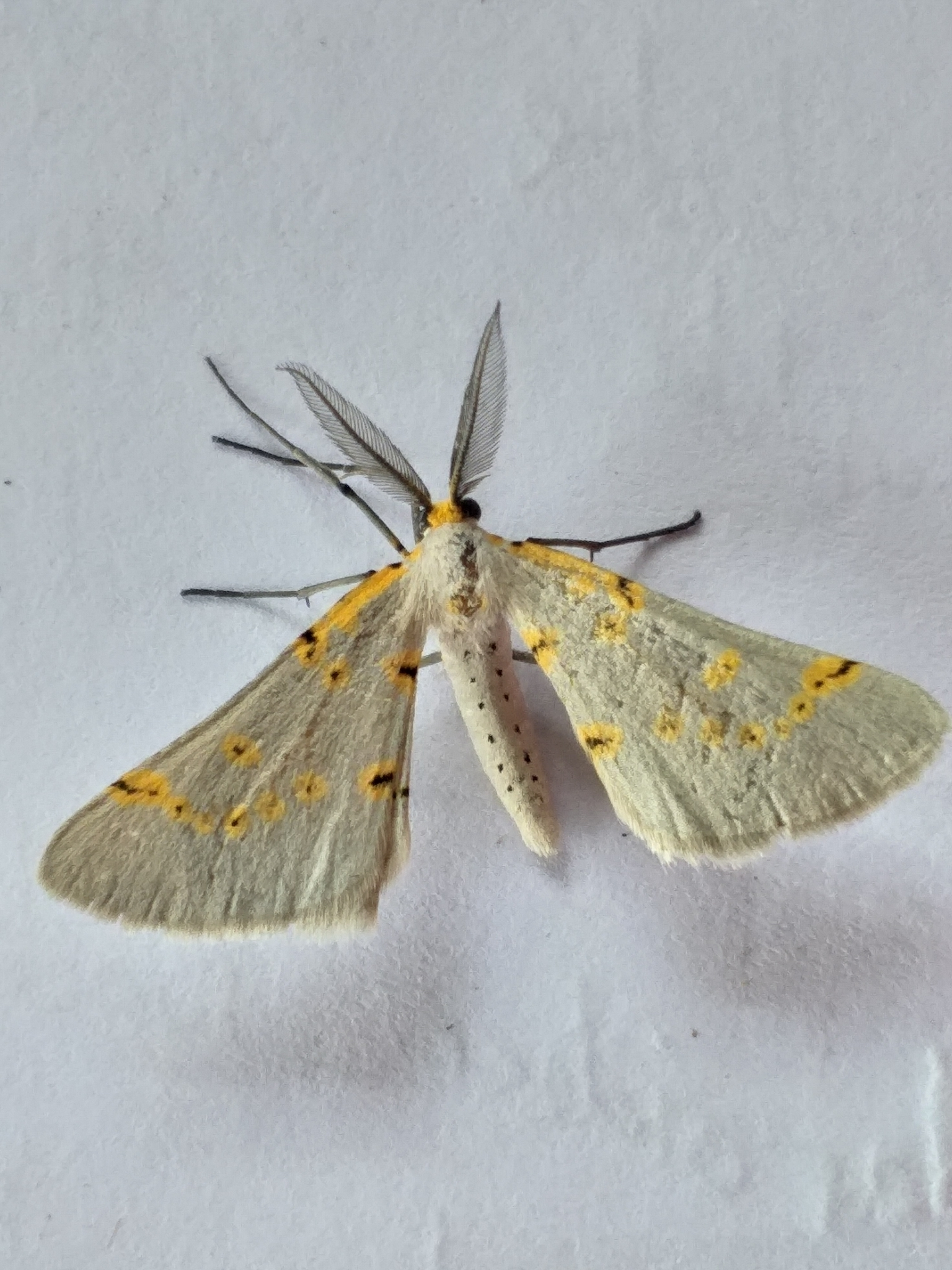
- Nassinia caffraria caffraria, South Africa

Scientific classification
- Kingdom: Animalia
- Phylum: Arthropoda
- Clade: Pancrustacea
- Class: Insecta
- Order: Lepidoptera
- Family: Geometridae
- Genus: Nassinia; D. S. Fletcher, 1979

= Nassinia =

Genus of moths

Nassinia is a genus of moths in the family Geometridae, found in Sub-Saharan Africa.

Some of the species are known to be partially diurnal, possibly as an adaptation for mate selection. Several such species are aposematic and their males are often active by day, but retain the bipectinate (comb-like on both sides) antennae of their strictly nocturnal relatives. Either sex may be found at light traps at night.

Their food plants seem to be poorly known.

== Species ==
These three species belong to the genus Nassinia:

- Nassinia aurantiaca (Prout, 1928)
- Nassinia caffraria (Linnaeus, 1767)
- Nassinia pretoria (Prout, 1916)
