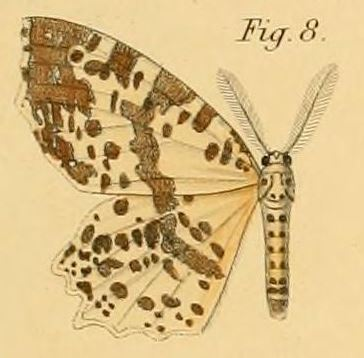
- Narthecusa tenuiorata

Scientific classification
- Kingdom: Animalia
- Phylum: Arthropoda
- Class: Insecta
- Order: Lepidoptera
- Family: Geometridae
- Subfamily: Ennominae
- Genus: Narthecusa; Walker, 1862

Type species
- Narthecusa tenuiorata Walker, 1862

Synonyms
- Negla Walker, 1862; Nolera Mabille, 1890

= Narthecusa =

Genus of moths

Narthecusa is a genus of moths in the family Geometridae erected by Francis Walker in 1862.

== Species ==
- Narthecusa perplexata (Walker, 1862)
- Narthecusa tenuiorata Walker, 1862
