= Nadagara =

Scientific classification
- Kingdom: Animalia
- Phylum: Arthropoda
- Class: Insecta
- Order: Lepidoptera
- Family: Geometridae
- Genus: Nadagara; Walker, 1861

Genus of moths

Nadagara is a genus of moths in the family Geometridae first described by Francis Walker in 1861.

== Description ==
Palpi with second joint hairy and reaching beyond the frontal tuft. Third joint porrect (extending forward). Antennae of male simple. Hind tibia not dilated. Forewings produced and acute at apex. Vein 3 from angle of cell and veins 7 to 9 stalked from before the angle. Vein 10 given off from vein 11. Hindwings with vein 3 from angle of cell. Cilia of both wings slightly crenulate (scalloped).

== Species ==
Some species of this genus are:

- Nadagara comprensata Walker, 1862
- Nadagara inordinata Walker, 1862
- Nadagara intractata Walker, 1862
- Nadagara irretracta Warren, 1899
- Nadagara juventinaria (Guenée, 1857)
- Nadagara prosigna Prout, 1930
- Nadagara reprensata Prout, 1916
- Nadagara scitilineata Walker, 1862
- Nadagara subnubila Inoue, 1967
- Nadagara synocha Prout, 1923
- Nadagara umbrifera Wileman, 1910
- Nadagara vigaia Walker, 1862
- Nadagara xylotrema (Lower, 1903)
