= Neonemoria =

Scientific classification
- Kingdom: Animalia
- Phylum: Arthropoda
- Class: Insecta
- Order: Lepidoptera
- Family: Geometridae
- Genus: Neonemoria; Warren, 1904
- Species: N. thalassinata

Binomial name
- Neonemoria thalassinata Snellen, 1874

Synonyms
- Mnesithetis decolor Warren, 1906; Neonemoria plana Warren, 1904; Acidalia virescens Thierry-Mieg, 1892

Genus of moths

Neonemoria is a monotypic moth genus in the family Geometridae described by Warren in 1904. Its only species, Neonemoria thalassinata, found in Colombia, was first described by Snellen in 1874. There is one subspecies, Neonemoria thalassinata rasa, described by Warren in 1900, which was found in Venezuela.
