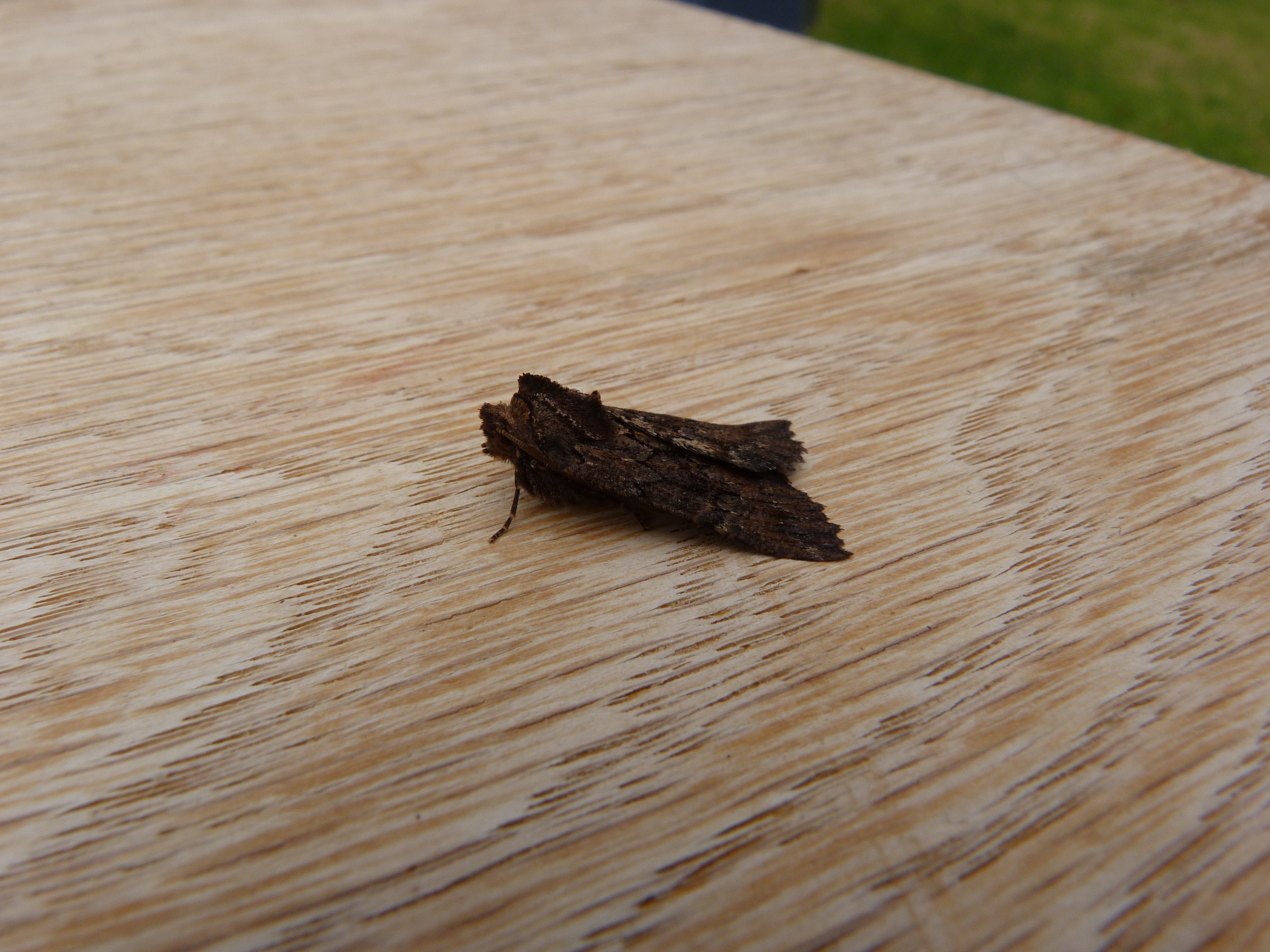
- Nisista serrata

Scientific classification
- Kingdom: Animalia
- Phylum: Arthropoda
- Class: Insecta
- Order: Lepidoptera
- Family: Geometridae
- Subfamily: Ennominae
- Genus: Nisista; Walker, 1860

Synonyms
- Vunga Walker, 1865; Symmiges Turner, 1919

= Nisista =

Genus of moths

Nisista is a genus of moths in the family Geometridae erected by Francis Walker in 1860.

== Species ==
- Nisista galearia (Guenée, 1857)
- Nisista notodontaria Walker, 1860
- Nisista serrata (Walker, 1857)
