= Plegapteryx =

Scientific classification
- Kingdom: Animalia
- Phylum: Arthropoda
- Clade: Pancrustacea
- Class: Insecta
- Order: Lepidoptera
- Family: Geometridae
- Genus: Plegapteryx; Herrich-Schäffer, [1856]

Synonyms
- Neuropolodes Warren, 1895; Rhamphopteryx Bryk, 1913; Syndetodes Warren, 1902

Genus of moths

Plegapteryx is a genus of moths in the family Geometridae erected by Gottlieb August Wilhelm Herrich-Schäffer in 1856.

== Species ==
- Plegapteryx anomalus Herrich-Schäffer, [1856]
- Plegapteryx hellingsi Carcasson, 1962
- Plegapteryx obscura Holland, 1893
- Plegapteryx peregrinus Carcasson, 1962
- Plegapteryx prouti Bethune-Baker, 1927
- Plegapteryx purpurascens Holland, 1893
- Plegapteryx sphingata Warren, 1895
- Plegapteryx subsplendens Holland, 1893
