= Narapa =

Scientific classification
- Kingdom: Animalia
- Phylum: Annelida
- Clade: Pleistoannelida
- Clade: Sedentaria
- Class: Clitellata
- Order: Haplotaxida
- Family: Narapidae; Righi & Varela, 1983
- Genus: Narapa; Righi & Varela, 1983
- Species: N. bonettoi

Binomial name
- Narapa bonettoi Righi & Varela, 1983

Species of annelid

Narapa is a genus of annelids in the monotypic family Narapidae. The genus is also monotypic, being represented by the single species Narapa bonettoi.

The species is found in South America.
