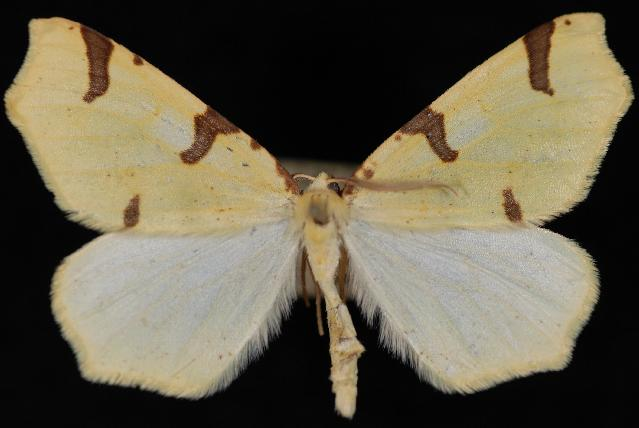
- Neoterpes trianguliferata

Scientific classification
- Kingdom: Animalia
- Phylum: Arthropoda
- Class: Insecta
- Order: Lepidoptera
- Family: Geometridae
- Tribe: Ourapterygini
- Genus: Neoterpes; Hulst, 1896

= Neoterpes =

Genus of moths

Neoterpes is a genus of moths in the family Geometridae described by George Duryea Hulst in 1896.

== Species ==
- Neoterpes ephelidaria (Hulst, 1886)
- Neoterpes trianguliferata (Packard, 1871)
- Neoterpes edwardsata (Packard, 1871)
- Neoterpes graefiaria (Hulst, 1887)
