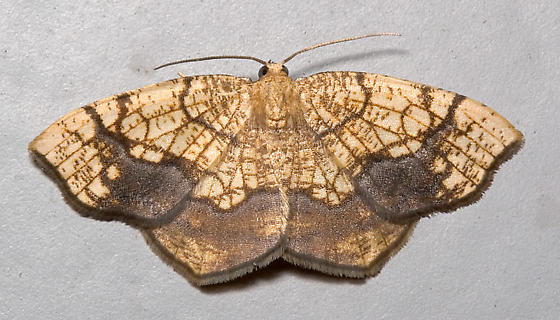
- Nematocampa resistaria

Scientific classification
- Kingdom: Animalia
- Phylum: Arthropoda
- Class: Insecta
- Order: Lepidoptera
- Family: Geometridae
- Subfamily: Ennominae
- Genus: Nematocampa; Guenée, 1857

= Nematocampa =

Genus of moths

Nematocampa is a genus of moths in the family Geometridae.

== Species ==
- Nematocampa amandaria (Guenée, 1858)
- Nematocampa angulifera Oberthur, 1883
- Nematocampa arenosa Butler, 1881
- Nematocampa baggettaria Ferguson, 1993
- Nematocampa brehmeata (Grossbeck, 1907)
- Nematocampa completa Warren, 1904
- Nematocampa confusa Warren, 1904
- Nematocampa decolorata Warren, 1900
- Nematocampa evanidaria Schaus, 1901
- Nematocampa falsa Warren, 1906
- Nematocampa interrupta Warren, 1907
- Nematocampa perfusa Bastelberger, 1909
- Nematocampa resistaria (Herrich-Schäffer, 1856)
- Nematocampa reticulata Butler, 1881
- Nematocampa straminea (Warren, 1900)
- Nematocampa varicata Walker, 1860
