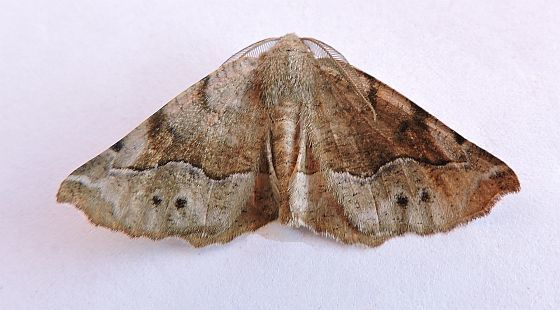
- Neoselenia hilumaria

Scientific classification
- Kingdom: Animalia
- Phylum: Arthropoda
- Class: Insecta
- Order: Lepidoptera
- Family: Geometridae
- Genus: Neoselenia (Hulst, 1886)

= Neoselenia =

Genus of moths

Neoselenia is a genus of moths in the family Geometridae.
