= Gnophini =

Scientific classification
- Kingdom: Animalia
- Phylum: Arthropoda
- Clade: Pancrustacea
- Class: Insecta
- Order: Lepidoptera
- Family: Geometridae
- Subfamily: Ennominae
- Tribe: Gnophini; Duponchel, 1845

Tribe of moths

Gnophini is a tribe of moths.

== Taxonomy ==
Gnophini contains the following genera:

- Acrognophos Wiltshire, 1967
- Apoaspilates Wehrli, 1954
- Arbognophos Viidalepp, 1979
- Aspitates Treitschke, 1825
- Atomorpha Staudinger, 1901
- Autotrichia Prout, 1934
- Bizia Walker, 1860
- Chariaspilates Wehrli, 1953
- Charissa Curtis, 1826
- Chelegnophos Wehrli, 1951
- Crocota Hübner, 1823
- Cryptochorina Wehrli, 1941
- Ctenognophos Prout, 1915
- Descoreba Butler, 1878
- Diaprepesilla Wehrli, 1937
- Dyscia Hübner, 1825
- Elophos Boisduval, 1840
- Ematurga Lederer, 1853
- Enanthyperythra Wehrli, 1937
- Glacies Millière, 1874
- Gnophos Treitschke, 1825
- Hirasa Moore, 1888
- Hypotephrina Janse, 1932
- Hypoxystis Prout, 1915
- Loxaspilates Warren, 1893
- Megalycinia Wehrli, 1939
- Megaspilates Warren, 1894
- Mohacolora Stüning & László, 2015
- Napuca Walker, 1863
- Neognopharmia Wehrli, 1951
- Nychiodes Lederer, 1853
- Odontognophos Wehrli, 1951
- Paraboarmia Krampl, 1994
- Perconia Hübner, 1823
- Phthonandria Warren, 1894
- Phyllometra Boisduval, 1840
- Planociampa Prout, 1930
- Psodos Treitschke, 1825
- Psyra Walker, 1860
- Pterygnophos Wehrli, 1951
- Rhipignophos Wehrli, 1951
- Scodionista Joannis, 1912
- Semiaspilates Wehrli, 1953
- Siona Duponchel, 1829
- Stueningia Hausmann, 1993
- Synopsia Hübner, 1825
- Synopsidia Djakonov, 1935
