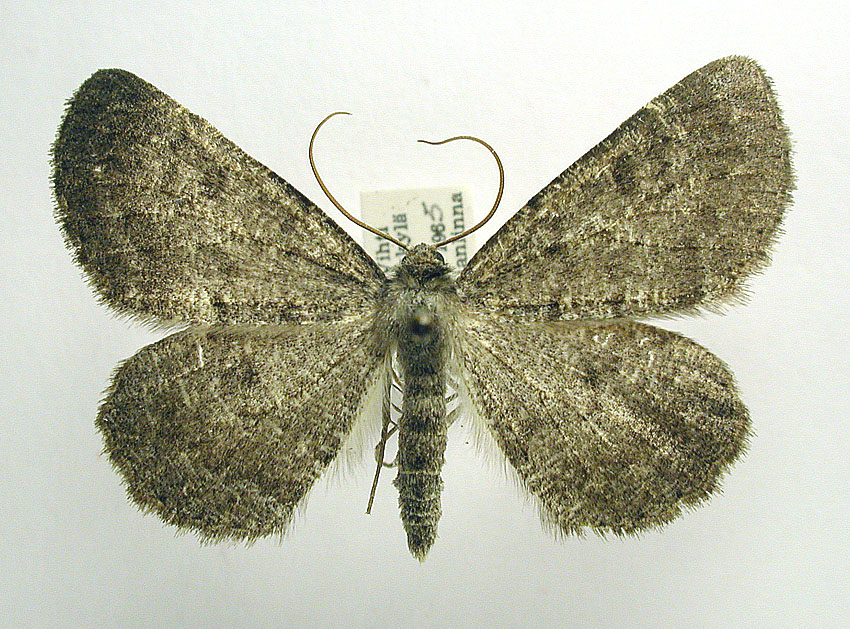
- Scotch annulet (Gnophos obfuscata)

Scientific classification
- Kingdom: Animalia
- Phylum: Arthropoda
- Clade: Pancrustacea
- Class: Insecta
- Order: Lepidoptera
- Family: Geometridae
- Tribe: Boarmiini
- Genus: Gnophos; Treitschke, 1825

Type species
- Geometra furvata Denis & Schiffermüller, 1775

Diversity
- Several subgenera, about 120 species

Synonyms
- Acrognophos Wiltshire, 1967; Catascia Hübner, 1825; Gnophus Agassiz, 1847 (unjustified emendation); Latascia (lapsus); Sciadion Hübner, 1806 (nom. rej.); Scotopterix Hübner, 1825; Scotopteryx Agassiz, 1847 (unjustified emendation; non Hübner, 1825: preoccupied)

= Gnophos =

Genus of moths

Gnophos is a genus in the geometer moth family (Geometridae). A mostly Old World lineage, it is abundant in the Palearctic, with some North American species as well; in Europe six species are recorded. This genus has about 120 known species altogether in several recognized subgenera, with new ones still being discovered occasionally.

This is the type genus of the tribe Gnophini in subfamily Ennominae, which some authors include in the Boarmiini.

== Selected species ==
Subgenera and species of Gnophos include:

Subgenus Acrognophos Wiltshire, 1967
- Gnophos iveni Erschoff, 1874

Subgenus Chelegnophos Wehrli, 1951

- Gnophos ravistriolaria Wehrli, 1922

Subgenus Cnestrognophos Wehrli, 1951

- Gnophos praeacutaria Wehrli, 1922

Subgenus Dicrognophos Wehrli, 1951

- Gnophos orthogonia Wehrli, 1939
- Gnophos pseudosnelleni Rjabov, 1964
- Gnophos sartata (Treitschke, 1827)

Subgenus Dysgnophos Wehrli, 1951

- Gnophos difficilis Alphéraky, 1883

Subgenus Gnophos Treitschke, 1825 (including Catascia)

- Gnophos furvata (Denis & Schiffermüller, 1775)
- Gnophos obfuscata (Denis & Schiffermüller, 1775)

Subgenus Odontognophos Wehrli, 1951

- Gnophos dumetata Treitschke, 1827
- Gnophos perspersata Treitschke, 1827
- Gnophos zacharia Staudinger, 1879

Subgenus Organognophos Wehrli, 1951

- Gnophos sibiriata Guenée, 1857

Subgenus Pterygnophos Wehrli, 1951

- Gnophos ochrofasciata Staudinger, 1896

Subgenus Rhinognophos Wehrli, 1951

- Gnophos similaria Rothschild, 1914

Subgenus Rhipignophos Wehrli, 1951

- Gnophos pervicinaria Wehrli, 1922

Subgenus Sacrognophos Wehrli, 1951

- Gnophos sacraria Staudinger, 1895

Subgenus Trilobignophos Wehrli, 1951

- Gnophos pollinaria Christoph, 1887

Subgenus Zystrognophos Wehrli, 1945

- Gnophos kuldjana (Wehrli, 1953)
- Gnophos sericaria Alphéraky, 1883
- Gnophos nimbata Alphéraky, 1888

Relationships to be determined

- Gnophos delagardei Prout, 1915
- Gnophos macguffini Smiles, 1978
- Gnophos rubricimixta Prout, 1915
- Gnophos spinicosta Krüger, 2005
- Gnophos thibetaria Oberthür, 1884
- Gnophos truncatipennis Krüger, 2005

Some other species formerly placed here are now in related genera such as Charissa, Ortaliella and Stueningia
