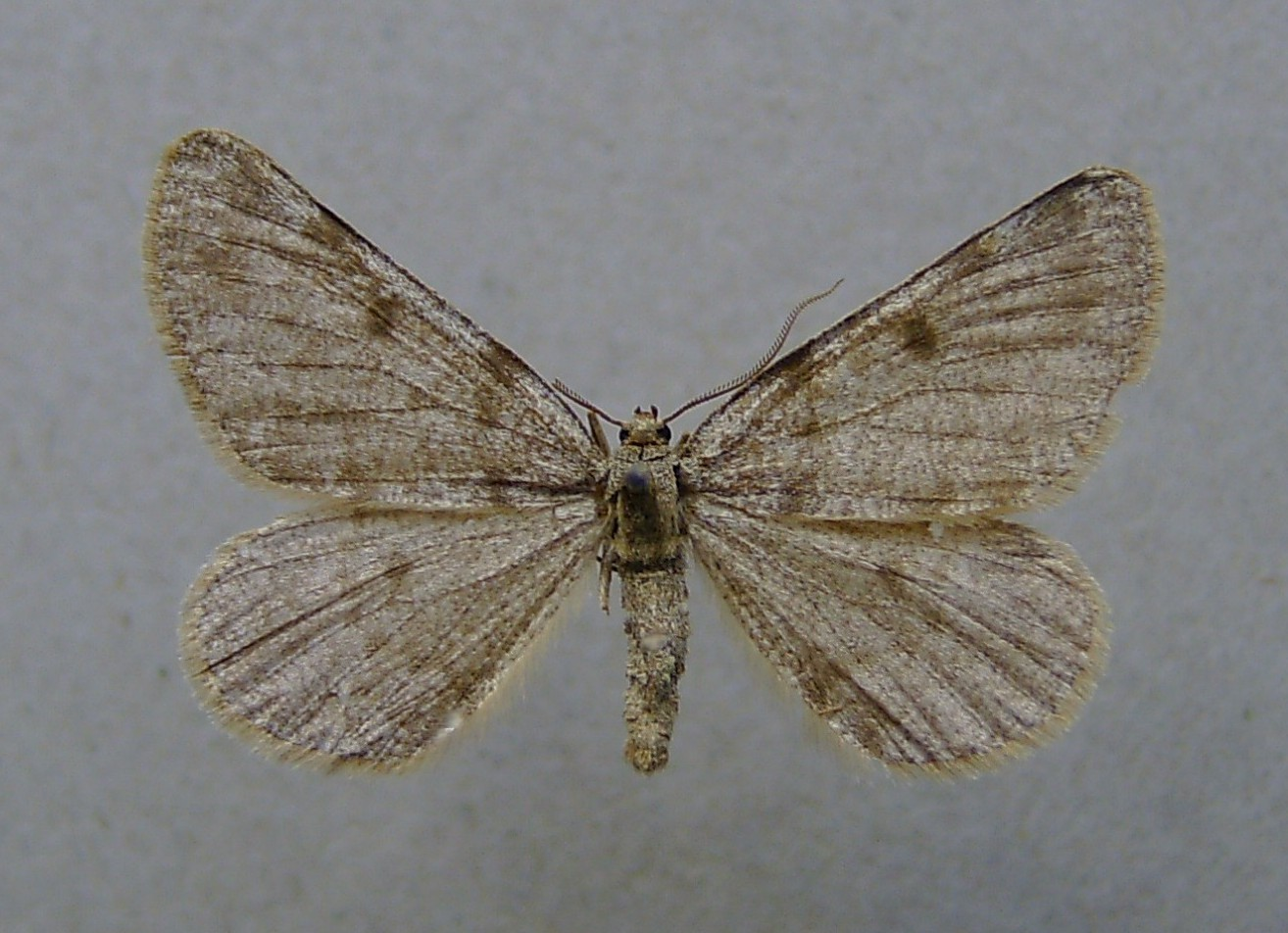

Scientific classification
- Kingdom: Animalia
- Phylum: Arthropoda
- Clade: Pancrustacea
- Class: Insecta
- Order: Lepidoptera
- Family: Geometridae
- Genus: Elophos
- Species: E. caelibaria

Binomial name
- Elophos caelibaria (Heydenreich, 1851)

Synonyms
- Hibernia caelibaria Heydenreich, 1851; Gnophos jugicolaria Fuchs, 1901; Gnophos senilaria Fuchs, 1901; Gnophos spurcaria de La Harpe, 1853

= Elophos caelibaria =

Species of moth

Elophos caelibaria is a moth of the family Geometridae. It is mainly found in the Alps at elevations between 2000 and 3000 metres, as well as in mountains in Spain and Slovenia.

Between males and females there is a phenotypic sexual dimorphism. The wingspan of the males is 24–32 mm. Females have only wing-stumps of less than 18 mm. They live from June to August.

The larvae feed on various low-growing plants, including Saxifraga, Plantago, Rumex and Campanula species. They overwinter twice.

== Subspecies ==
- Elophos caelibaria caelibaria
- Elophos caelibaria jugicolaria Fuchs, 1901
- Elophos caelibaria senilaria Fuchs, 1901
- Elophos caelibaria spurcaria de La Harpe, 1853
