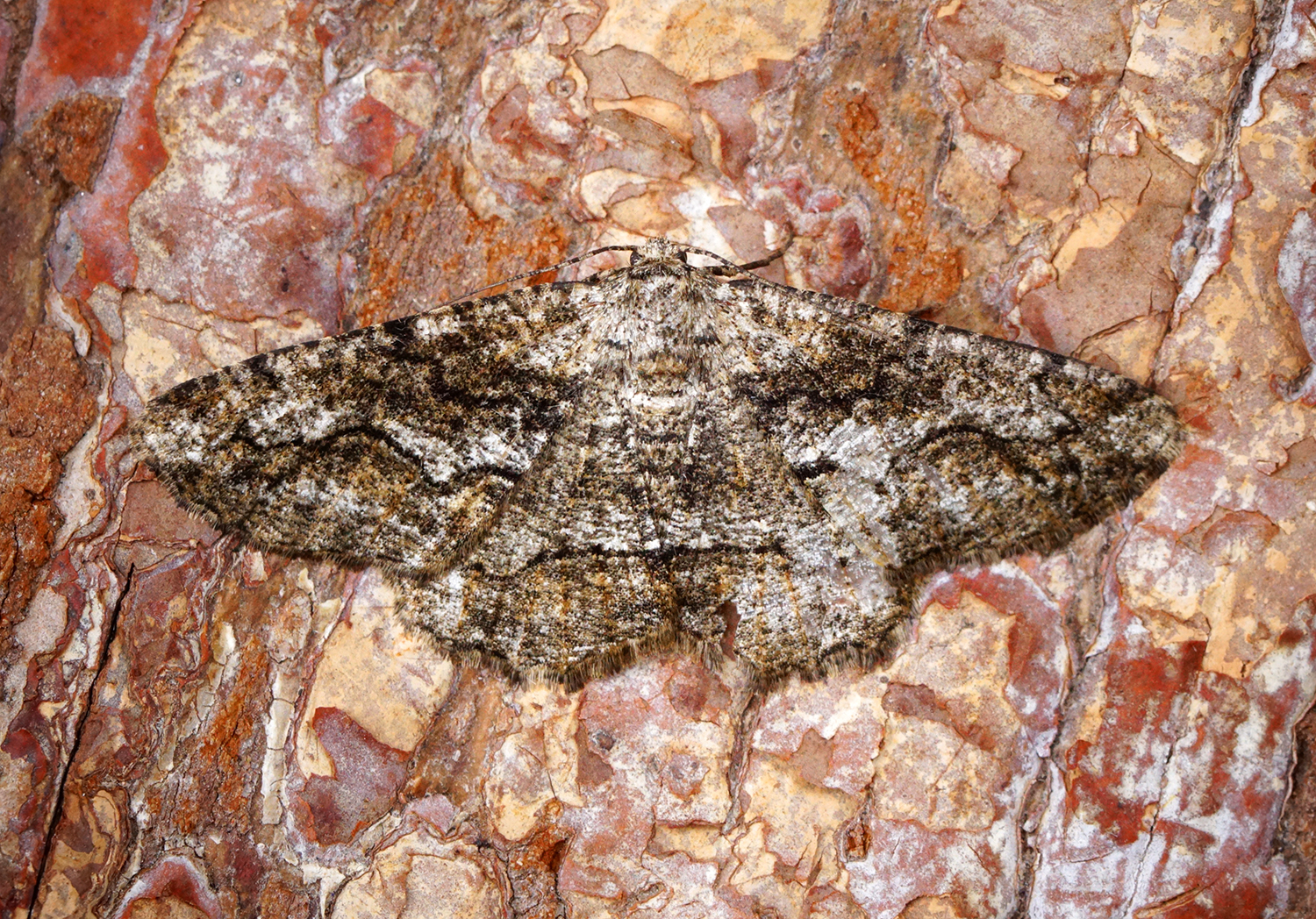

Scientific classification
- Domain: Eukaryota
- Kingdom: Animalia
- Phylum: Arthropoda
- Class: Insecta
- Order: Lepidoptera
- Family: Geometridae
- Genus: Synopsia
- Species: S. sociaria

Binomial name
- Synopsia sociaria (Hübner, 1799)

Synonyms
- List: Geometra sociaria Hubner, 1799; Synopsia almasa Schawerda, 1912; Boarmia propinquaria Boisduval, 1840; Synopsia unitaria Prout, 1915

= Synopsia sociaria =

Species of moth

Synopsia sociaria is a species of moth in the family Geometridae. It is found from the southern part of central Europe to western Central Asia. In the north, the range extends from the North Sea coast to the Baltic region and Russia. In the Caucasus, subspecies S. sociaria unitaria is found.

The wingspan is 28–34 mm. In the southern part of the range, adults are on wing from the end of March to the beginning of June and again from the beginning of July to the beginning of October in two generations per year. North of the Alps, there is only one generation per year with adults on wing from July to August.

The larvae feed on various plant, including Genista, Artemisia, Echium and Erica species. Pupation occurs on the ground between moss.

== Subspecies ==
- Synopsia sociaria sociaria
- Synopsia sociaria unitaria (Staudinger, 1870) (Caucasus)

Synopsia sociaria propinquaria from Corsica is sometimes treated as a valid subspecies.
