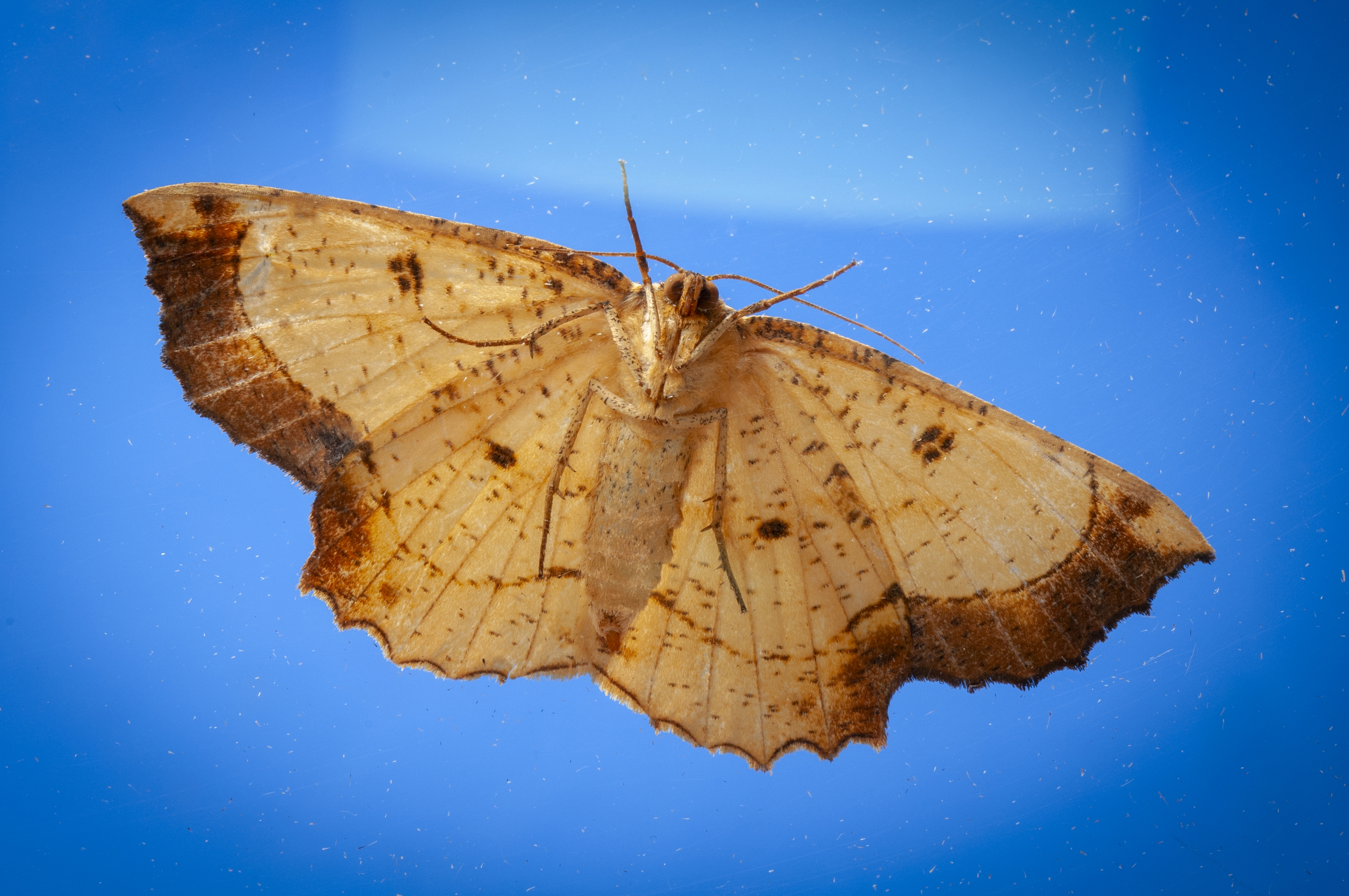
- Bizia aexaria (ventral)

Scientific classification
- Kingdom: Animalia
- Phylum: Arthropoda
- Clade: Pancrustacea
- Class: Insecta
- Order: Lepidoptera
- Family: Geometridae
- Tribe: Gnophini
- Genus: Bizia; Walker, 1860

= Bizia =

Genus of moths

Bizia is a genus of moths in the family Geometridae.

== Species ==
- Bizia aexaria Walker, 1860
- Bizia grandinaria (Motschulsky, 1860)
