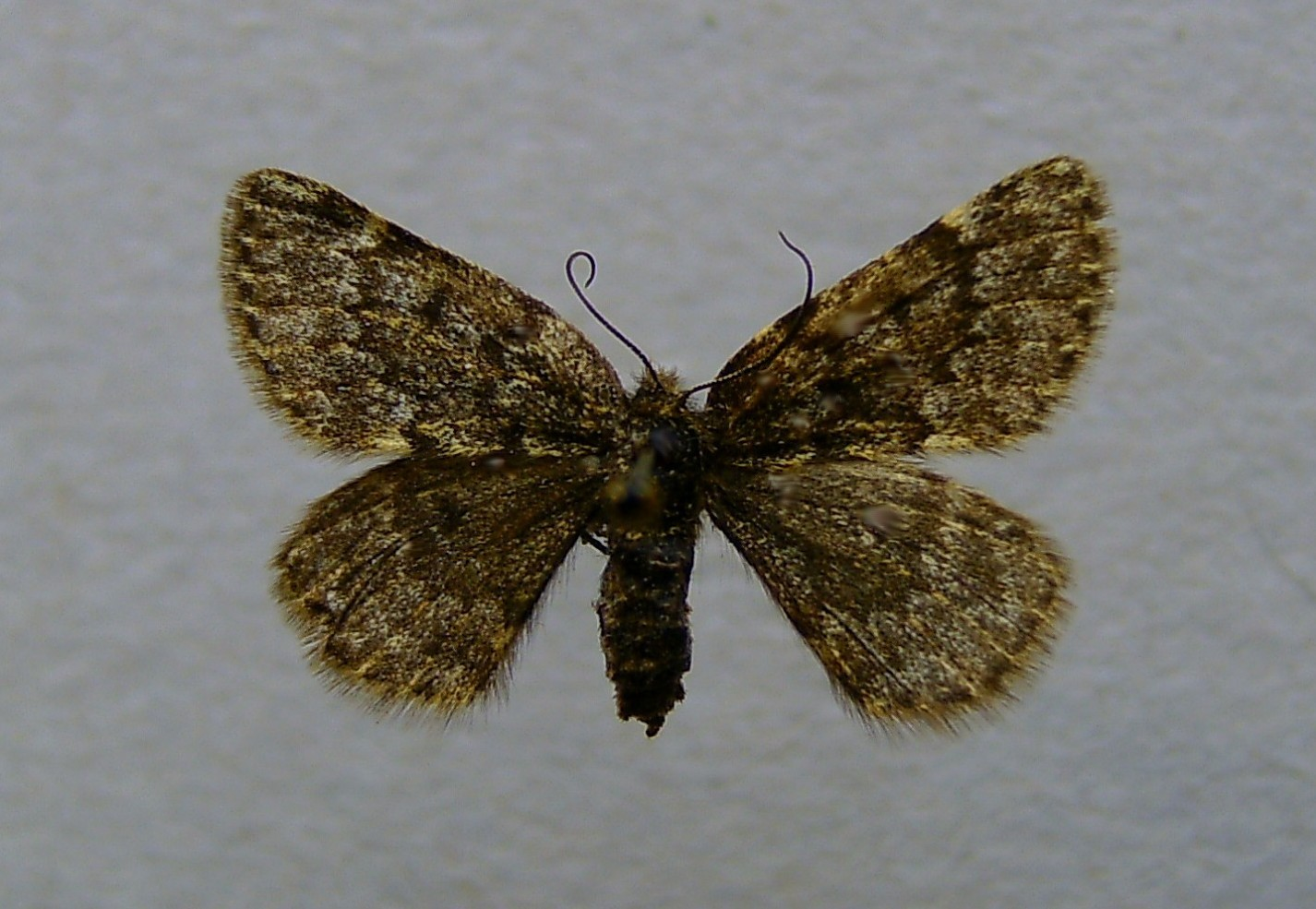

Scientific classification
- Kingdom: Animalia
- Phylum: Arthropoda
- Class: Insecta
- Order: Lepidoptera
- Family: Geometridae
- Genus: Glacies
- Species: G. coracina

Binomial name
- Glacies coracina (Esper, 1805)

Synonyms
- Phalaena (Noctua) coracina Esper, 1805; Psodos coracina

= Glacies coracina =

Species of moth

Glacies coracina, the black mountain moth, is a moth of the family Geometridae. The species was first described by Eugenius Johann Christoph Esper in 1805. It is found in northern Europe and in mountainous areas from Norway, Sweden, Finland, Poland and northern Russia to Japan. It is also present in Great Britain, Romania and Bulgaria and in the Alps. It is found at elevations of up to 3,000 meters.

The wingspan is 18–24 mm. Adults are on wing from June to August and are day active. There is one generation per year.

The larva feeds on the leaves of various low-growing plants, including Betula nana and Empetrum nigrum.

== Subspecies ==
- Glacies coracina bureschi Varga, 1975 (Bulgaria)
- Glacies coracina coracina (Esper, 1805)
- Glacies coracina dioszeghyi (Schmidt, 1930) (Hungary)
- Glacies coracina lappona (Wehrli, 1921)
- Glacies coracina pseudonoricana (Wehrli, 1921)
- Glacies coracina transiens (Wehrli, 1921)
- Glacies coracina tundranoides (Malicky, 1966)
