= Chelegnophos =

Scientific classification
- Kingdom: Animalia
- Phylum: Arthropoda
- Class: Insecta
- Order: Lepidoptera
- Family: Geometridae
- Tribe: Gnophini
- Genus: Chelegnophos; Wehrli, 1951

Genus of moths

Chelegnophos is a genus of moths in the family Geometridae.

== Species ==
- Chelegnophos alaianus Viidalepp, 1988
- Chelegnophos badakhshanus (Wiltshire, 1967)
- Chelegnophos fractifasciata (Püngeler, 1901)
- Chelegnophos orbicularia (Püngeler, 1904)
- Chelegnophos puengeleri (Bohatch, 1910)
- Chelegnophos ravistriolaria (Wehrli, 1922)
- Chelegnophos tholeraria (Wehrli, 1922)
