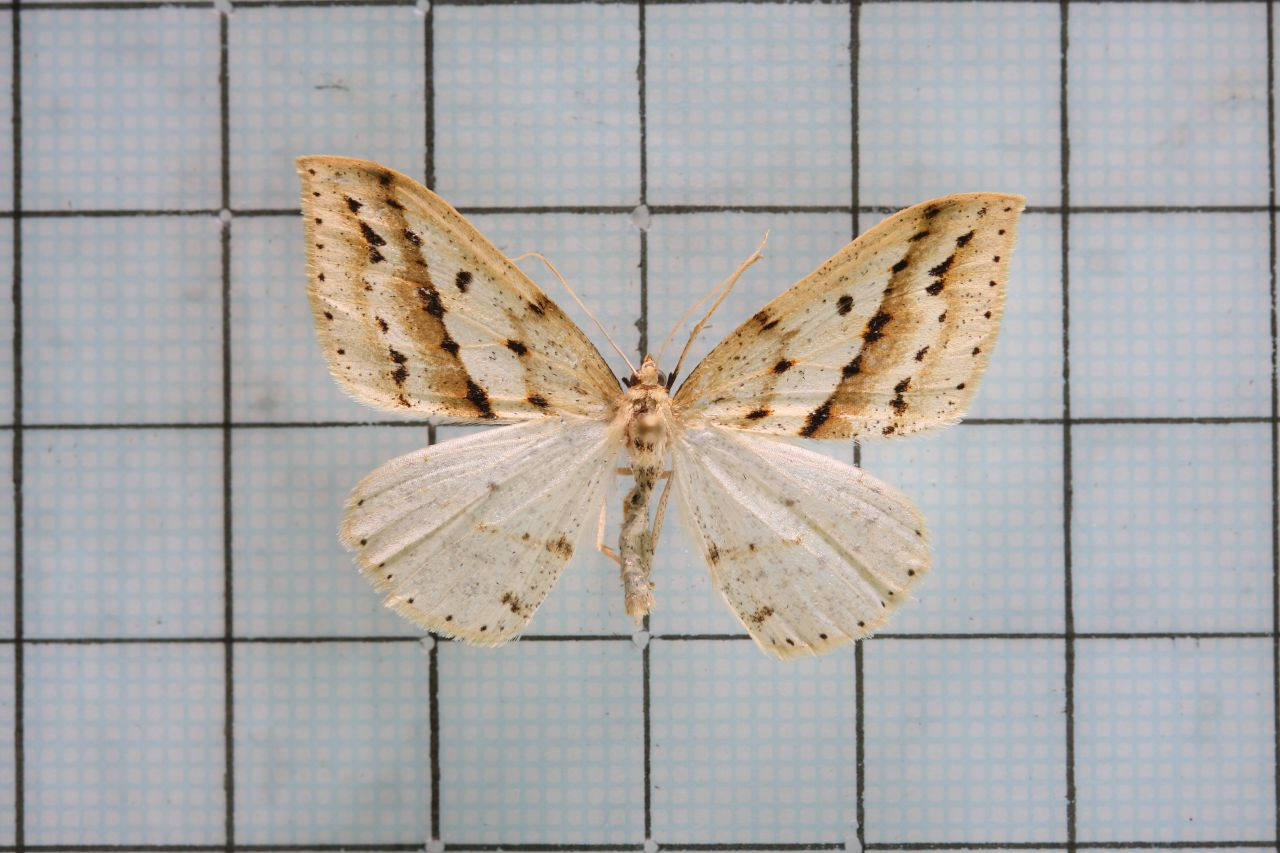

Scientific classification
- Kingdom: Animalia
- Phylum: Arthropoda
- Class: Insecta
- Order: Lepidoptera
- Family: Geometridae
- Genus: Loxaspilates
- Species: L. nakajimai

Binomial name
- Loxaspilates nakajimai Inoue, 1983

Synonyms
- Loxaspilates nakjimai

= Loxaspilates nakajimai =

Species of moth

Loxaspilates nakajimai is a moth in the family Geometridae first described by Hiroshi Inoue in 1983. It is found in Taiwan.
