= Gnophos macguffini =

Scientific classification
- Kingdom: Animalia
- Phylum: Arthropoda
- Clade: Pancrustacea
- Class: Insecta
- Order: Lepidoptera
- Family: Geometridae
- Tribe: Boarmiini
- Genus: Gnophos
- Species: G. macguffini

Binomial name
- Gnophos macguffini Smiles, 1979

Species of moth

Gnophos macguffini is a species of geometrid moth in the family Geometridae.
