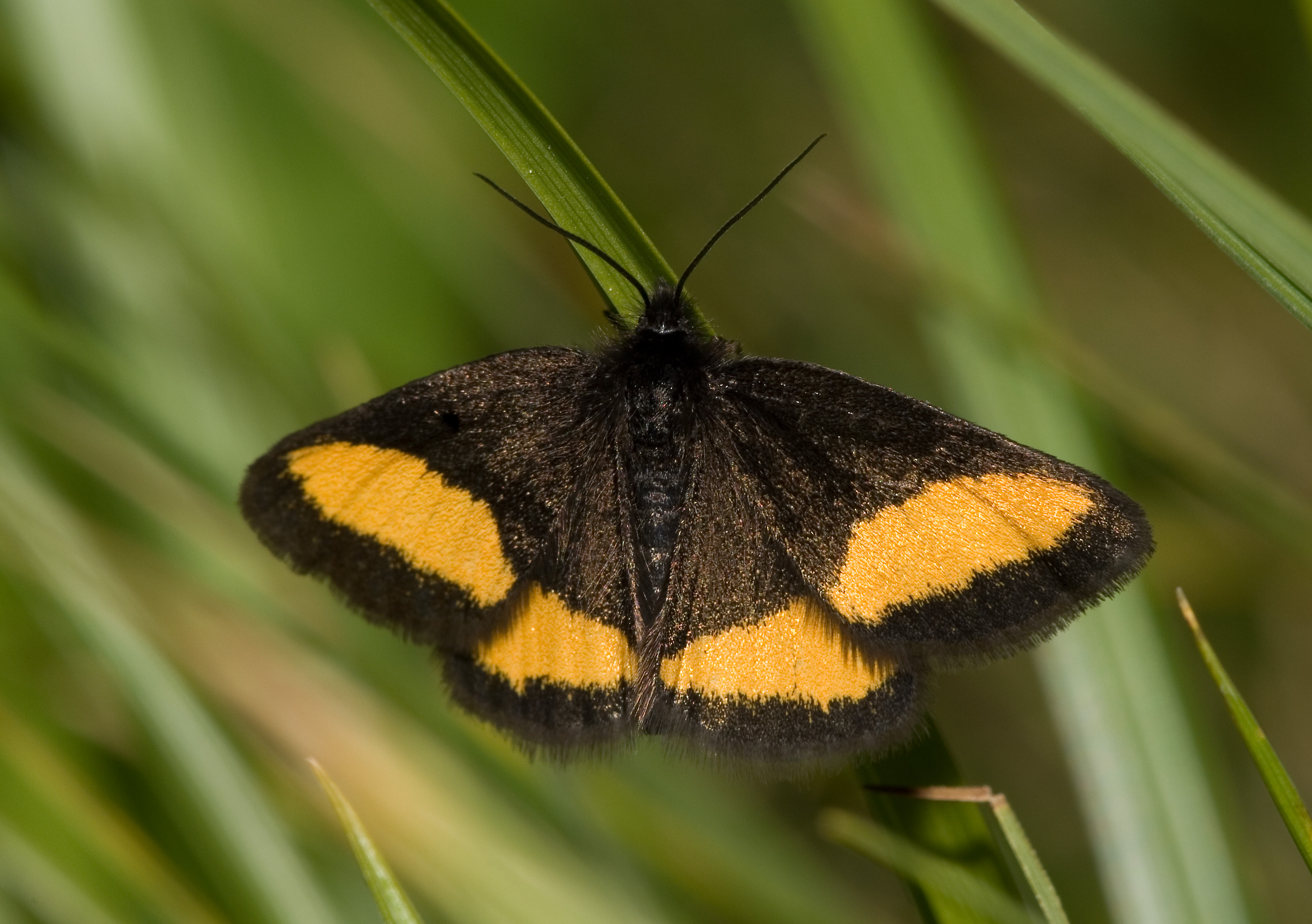
- Psodos quadrifaria

Scientific classification
- Domain: Eukaryota
- Kingdom: Animalia
- Phylum: Arthropoda
- Class: Insecta
- Order: Lepidoptera
- Family: Geometridae
- Tribe: Gnophini
- Genus: Psodos; Treitschke, 1825

= Psodos =

Genus of moths

Psodos is a genus of moths in the family Geometridae first described by Treitschke in 1825.

== Species ==
- Psodos quadrifaria (Sulzer, 1776)
- Psodos sajana Wehrli, 1919
