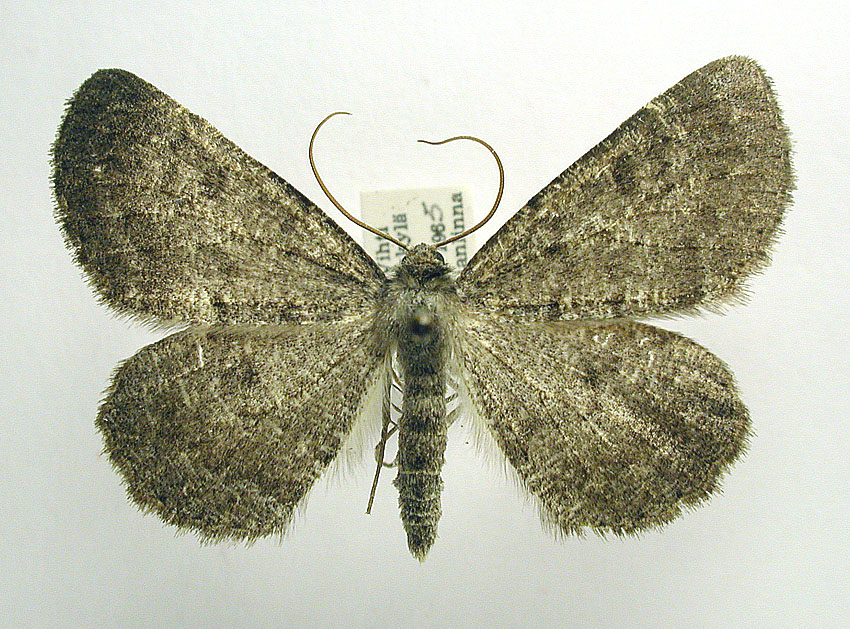

Scientific classification
- Domain: Eukaryota
- Kingdom: Animalia
- Phylum: Arthropoda
- Class: Insecta
- Order: Lepidoptera
- Family: Geometridae
- Genus: Gnophos
- Species: G. obfuscata

Binomial name
- Gnophos obfuscata (Denis & Schiffermüller, 1775)

Synonyms
- Geometra obfuscata Denis & Schiffermuller, 1775; Gnophos obfuscatus; Geometra limosaria Esper, 1806; Phalaena myrtillata Thunberg, 1788

= Gnophos obfuscata =

Species of moth

Gnophos obfuscata, commonly known as the Scotch annulet or Scottish annulet, is a moth of the family Geometridae. The species was first described by Michael Denis and Ignaz Schiffermüller in 1775. It can be found in northern, central, and southeastern Europe, as well as in Scotland, Ireland, and the Iberian Peninsula.

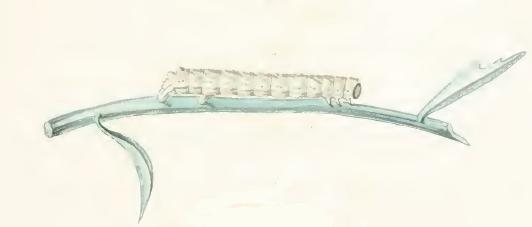
Larva

Pupa

The wingspan is 41–46 mm (1.6–1.8 in).The forewing has a dark spot and two, often indistinct, dark transverse lines that delimit a trapezoidal field that is sometimes slightly darker than the rest of the wing. It may also have a hint of a white transverse stripe along the outer edge, otherwise it is completely evenly colored. The larva is smooth, greyish-brown with two small warts on the back of the posterior body joint.

Adults are on wing in July and August.

The larvae feed on various plants found in heath areas, such as Calluna vulgaris and Saxifraga species.

== Subspecies ==
- Gnophos obfuscata obfuscata
- Gnophos obfuscata androgynus Reisser, 1936
- Gnophos obfuscata marsicaria Dannehl, 1933
- Gnophos obfuscata nivea Schawerda, 1913
