= Arbognophos =

Scientific classification
- Kingdom: Animalia
- Phylum: Arthropoda
- Class: Insecta
- Order: Lepidoptera
- Family: Geometridae
- Tribe: Gnophini
- Genus: Arbognophos; Viidalepp, 1979

Genus of geometer moths

Arbognophos is a genus of moths in the family Geometridae.

== Species ==
- Arbognophos amoenaria (Staudinger, 1897)
