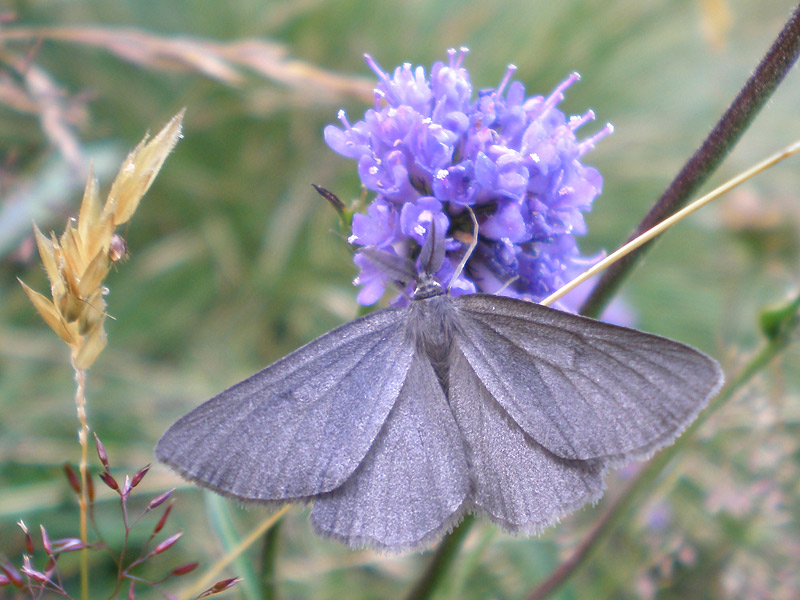

Scientific classification
- Domain: Eukaryota
- Kingdom: Animalia
- Phylum: Arthropoda
- Class: Insecta
- Order: Lepidoptera
- Family: Geometridae
- Genus: Crocota
- Species: C. peletieraria

Binomial name
- Crocota peletieraria (Duponchel, 1830)

Synonyms
- Cleogene peletieraria Duponchel, 1830

= Crocota peletieraria =

Species of moth

Crocota peletieraria, the pale dyer, is a moth of the family Geometridae. The species was first described by Philogène Auguste Joseph Duponchel in 1830. It is found in France and Spain.

The wingspan is 26–35 mm for males and 22–28 mm for females.

The larvae feed on Trifolium, Taraxacum, Plantago, Rumex, Lotus corniculatus and Achillea species (including Achillea ptarmica).
