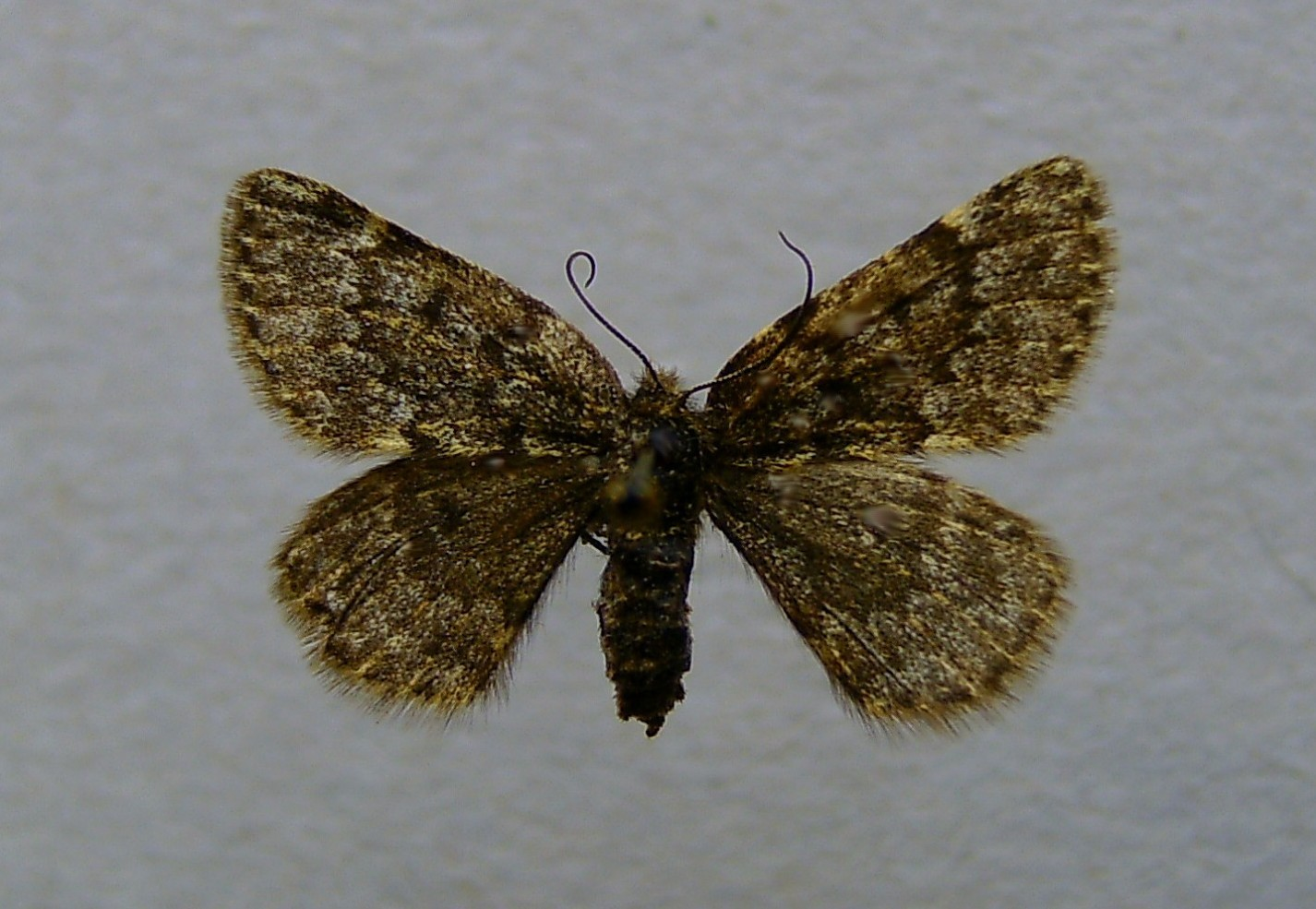
- Glacies coracina

Scientific classification
- Domain: Eukaryota
- Kingdom: Animalia
- Phylum: Arthropoda
- Class: Insecta
- Order: Lepidoptera
- Family: Geometridae
- Tribe: Gnophini
- Genus: Glacies; Millière, 1874

Synonyms
- Alpina Povolny & Moucha, 1956; Trepidina Povolny & Moucha, 1956; Triglavia Povolny & Moucha, 1956

= Glacies =

Genus of moths

Glacies is a genus of moths in the family Geometridae erected by Pierre Millière in 1874.

== Species ==
- Glacies alpinata (Scopoli, 1763)
- Glacies alticolaria (Mann, 1853)
- Glacies baldensis (Wolfsberger, 1966)
- Glacies bentelii (Rätzer, 1890)
- Glacies burmanni (Tarmann, 1984)
- Glacies canaliculata (Hochenwarth, 1785)
- Glacies coracina (Esper, 1805)
- Glacies noricana (Wagner, 1898)
- Glacies perlinii (Turati, 1915)
- Glacies spitzi (Rebel, 1906)
- Glacies wehrlii (Vorbrodt, 1918)
