= Atomorpha =

Scientific classification
- Kingdom: Animalia
- Phylum: Arthropoda
- Class: Insecta
- Order: Lepidoptera
- Family: Geometridae
- Tribe: Gnophini
- Genus: Atomorpha; Staudinger, 1901

Genus of moths

Atomorpha is a genus of moths in the family Geometridae.

== Species ==
- Atomorpha falsaria (Alphéraky, 1892)
- Atomorpha hedemanni (Christoph, 1885)
- Atomorpha marmorata (A. Bang-Haas, 1907)
- Atomorpha punctistrigaria (Christoph, 1893)
