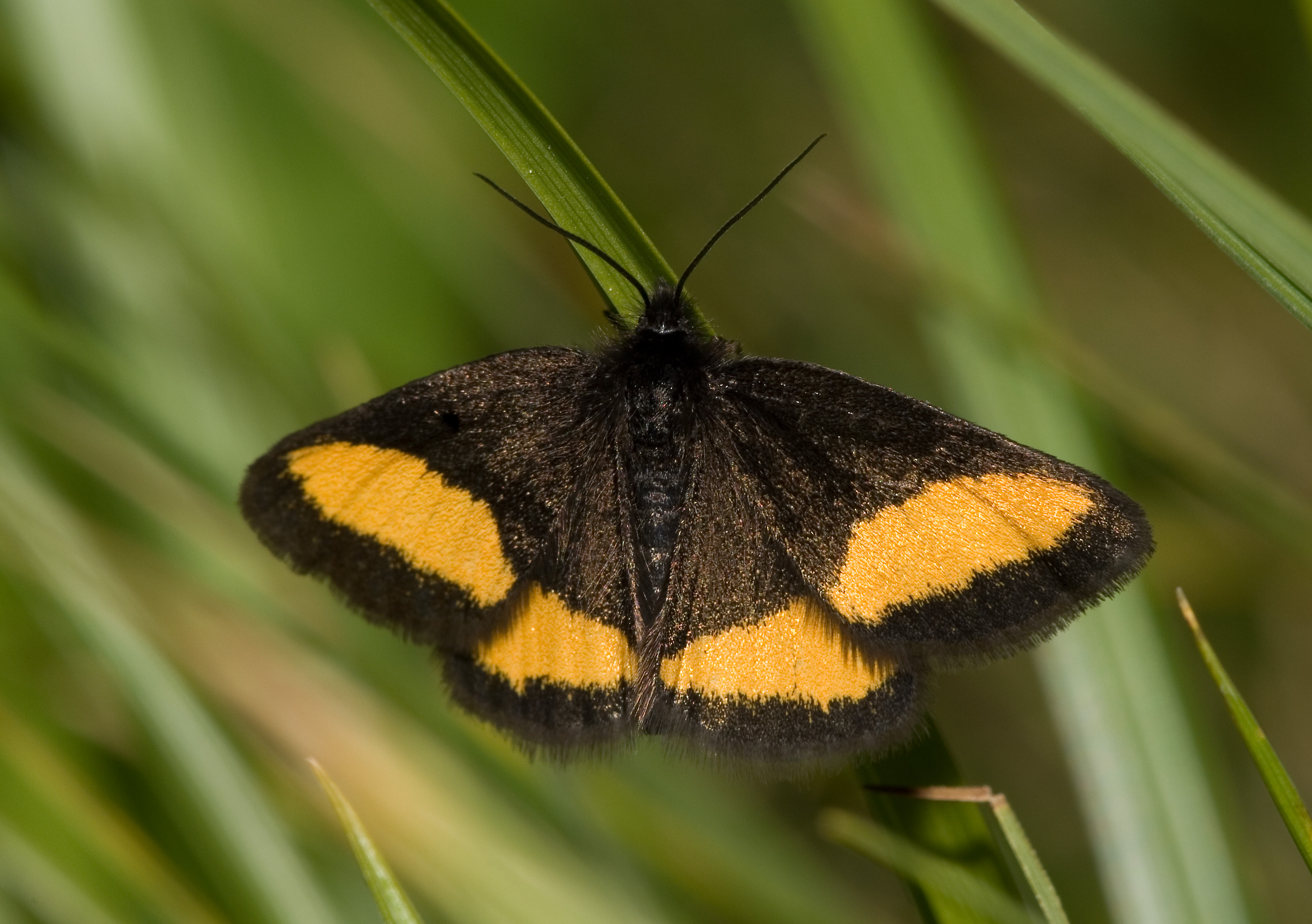

Scientific classification
- Domain: Eukaryota
- Kingdom: Animalia
- Phylum: Arthropoda
- Class: Insecta
- Order: Lepidoptera
- Family: Geometridae
- Genus: Psodos
- Species: P. quadrifaria

Binomial name
- Psodos quadrifaria (Sulzer, 1776)

Synonyms
- Phalaena quadrifaria Sulzer, 1776; Phalaena equestrata Fabricius, [1776]

= Psodos quadrifaria =

Species of moth

Psodos quadrifaria is a moth of the family Geometridae first described by Johann Heinrich Sulzer in 1776. It is found in the higher parts of the Alps, as well as the Pyrenees, the High Tatras and the Balkan Mountains. It also has a scattered distribution in the Giant Mountains. Psodos quadrifaria is found at heights of up to 2,700 metres.

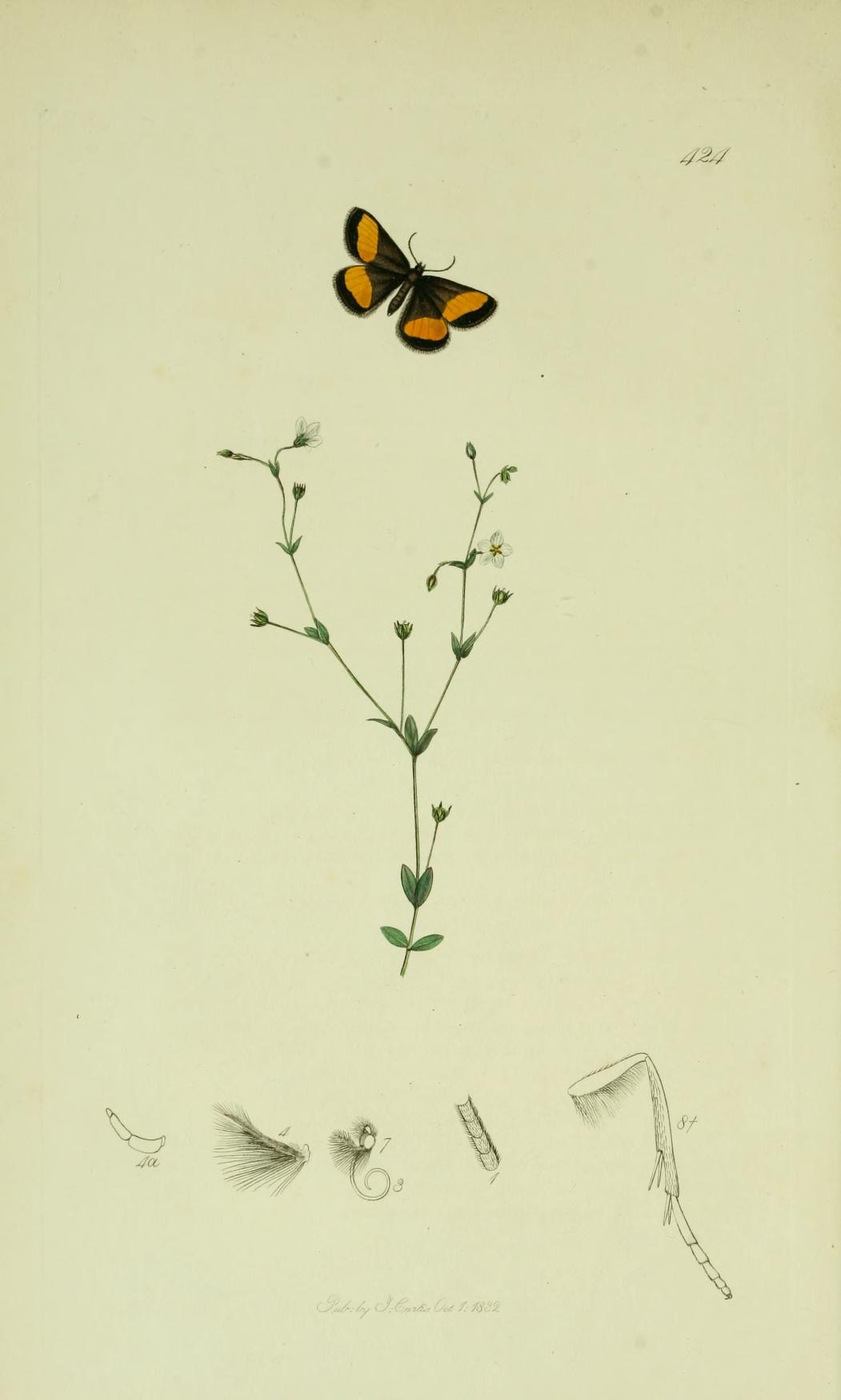
Illustration from John Curtis's British Entomology Volume 6

The wingspan is 18–25 mm. Adults are on wing from the end of May to mid-August and are day active. There is one generation per year.

The larvae feed on the leaves of various low-growing plants.
