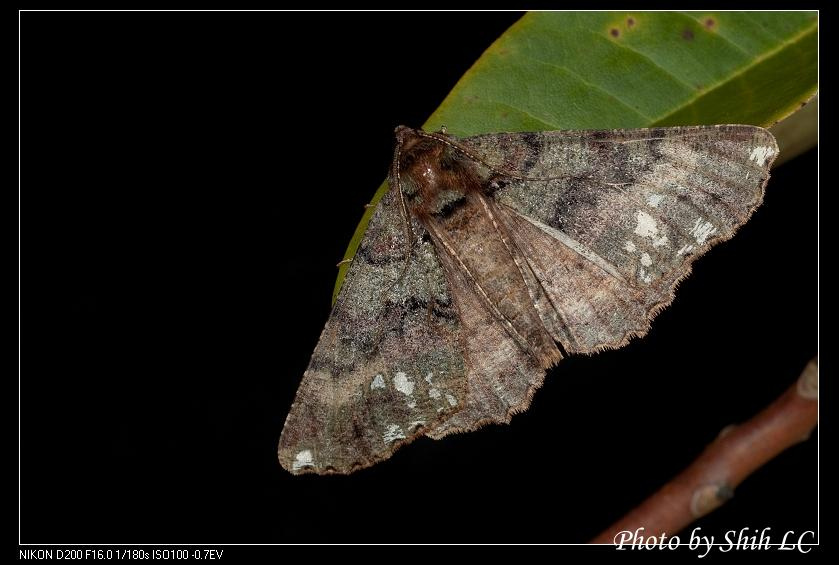

Scientific classification
- Kingdom: Animalia
- Phylum: Arthropoda
- Class: Insecta
- Order: Lepidoptera
- Family: Geometridae
- Genus: Cryptochorina
- Species: C. polychroia

Binomial name
- Cryptochorina polychroia (Wehrli, 1941)

Synonyms
- Medasina polychroia Wehrli, 1941

= Cryptochorina polychroia =

Species of moth

Cryptochorina polychroia is a moth of the family Geometridae. It is found in Taiwan.
