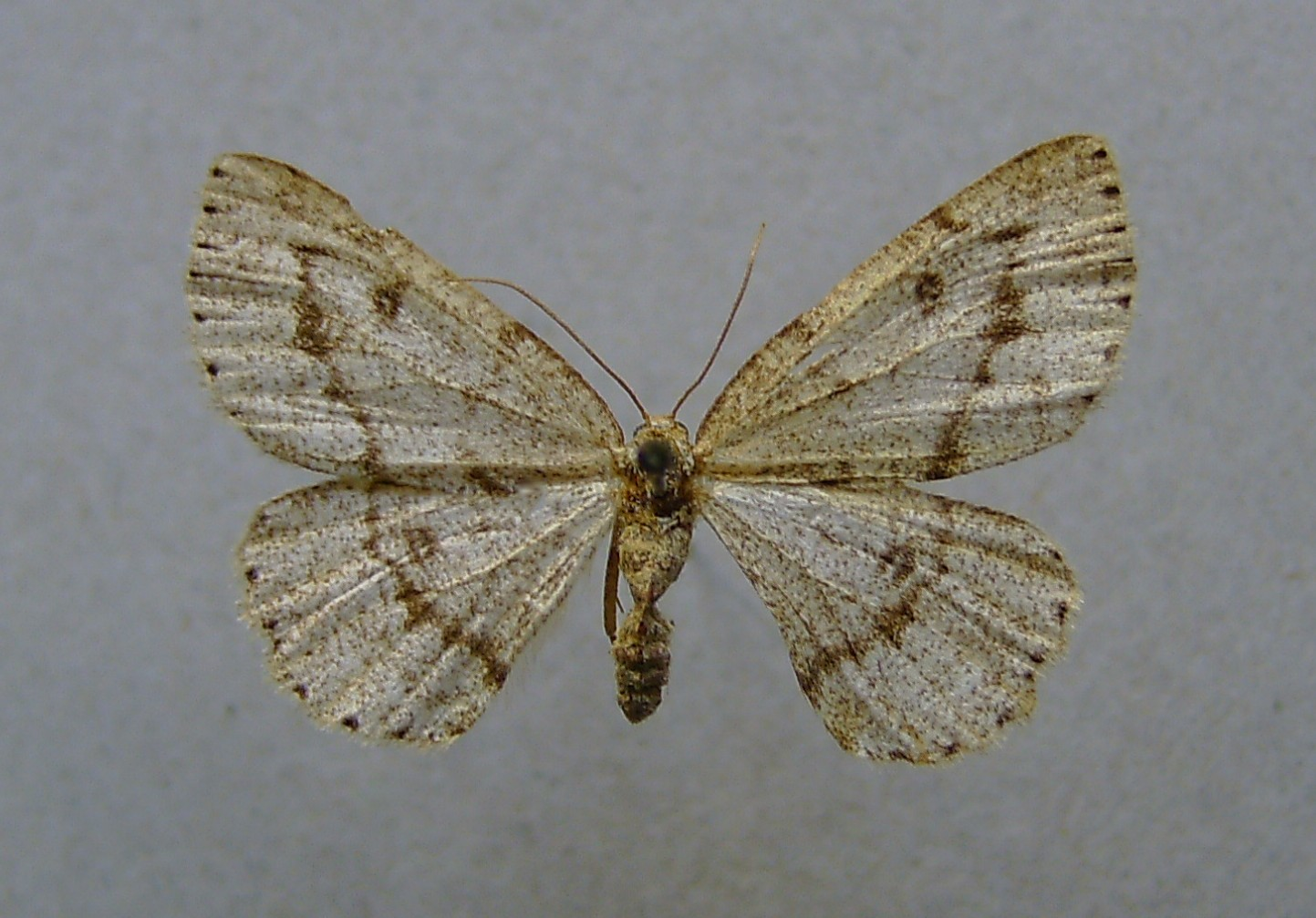
- Subspecies mendicaria
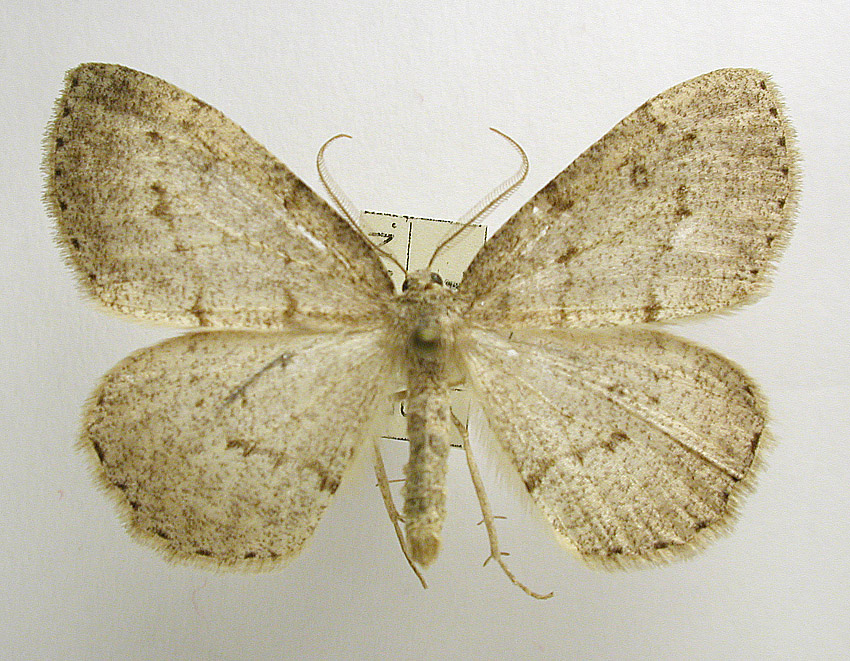
- Subspecies vittaria

Scientific classification
- Kingdom: Animalia
- Phylum: Arthropoda
- Class: Insecta
- Order: Lepidoptera
- Family: Geometridae
- Genus: Elophos
- Species: E. vittaria

Binomial name
- Elophos vittaria (Thunberg, 1788)

Synonyms
- Gnophos sordaria (Thunberg, 1792); Catascia sordaria; Yezognophos vittaria; Parietaria vittaria

= Elophos vittaria =

Species of moth

Elophos vittaria is a moth of the family Geometridae first described by Carl Peter Thunberg in 1788. It is found in two separate areas in Europe. Subspecies mendicaria is found in the Alps and Mountains in central Europe, while subspecies vittaria is found from Fennoscandia, east through Russia and Asia to Japan.

The wingspan is 32–38 mm in central Europe and 25–36 mm in Fennoscandia. Adults are on wing from June to July.

The larvae feed on various low-growing plants, including Vaccinium and Betula species.
