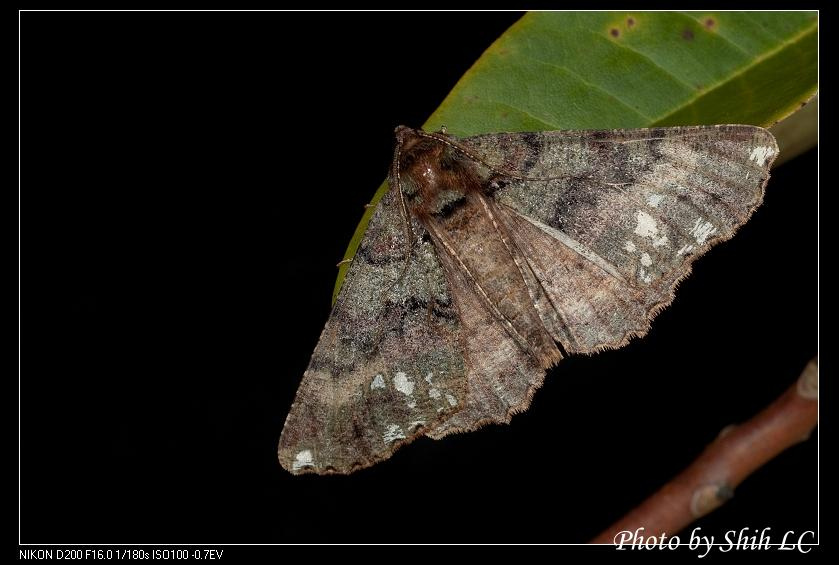
- Cryptochorina polychroia

Scientific classification
- Kingdom: Animalia
- Phylum: Arthropoda
- Class: Insecta
- Order: Lepidoptera
- Family: Geometridae
- Tribe: Gnophini
- Genus: Cryptochorina; Wehrli, 1941

= Cryptochorina =

Genus of moths

Cryptochorina is a genus of moths in the family Geometridae.

== Species ==
- Cryptochorina amphidasyaria (Oberthür, 1880)
- Cryptochorina polychroia (Wehrli 1941)
