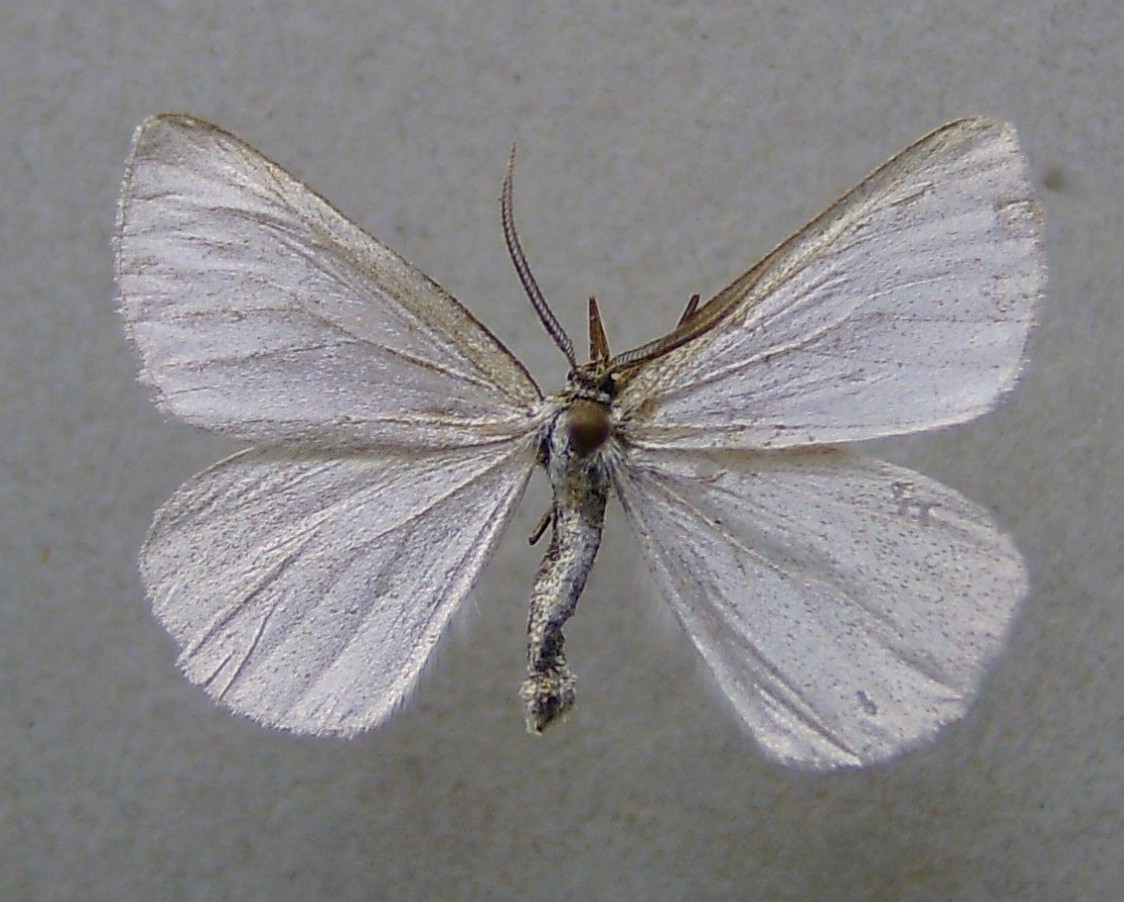

Scientific classification
- Kingdom: Animalia
- Phylum: Arthropoda
- Class: Insecta
- Order: Lepidoptera
- Family: Geometridae
- Genus: Crocota
- Species: C. niveata

Binomial name
- Crocota niveata (Scopoli, 1763)

Synonyms
- Phalaena niveata Scopoli, 1763

= Crocota niveata =

Species of moth

Crocota niveata is a moth of the family Geometridae. It is found in Austria and Romania. The wingspan is 26–30 mm for males and 23–26 mm for females. Adults are on wing in June and July.
