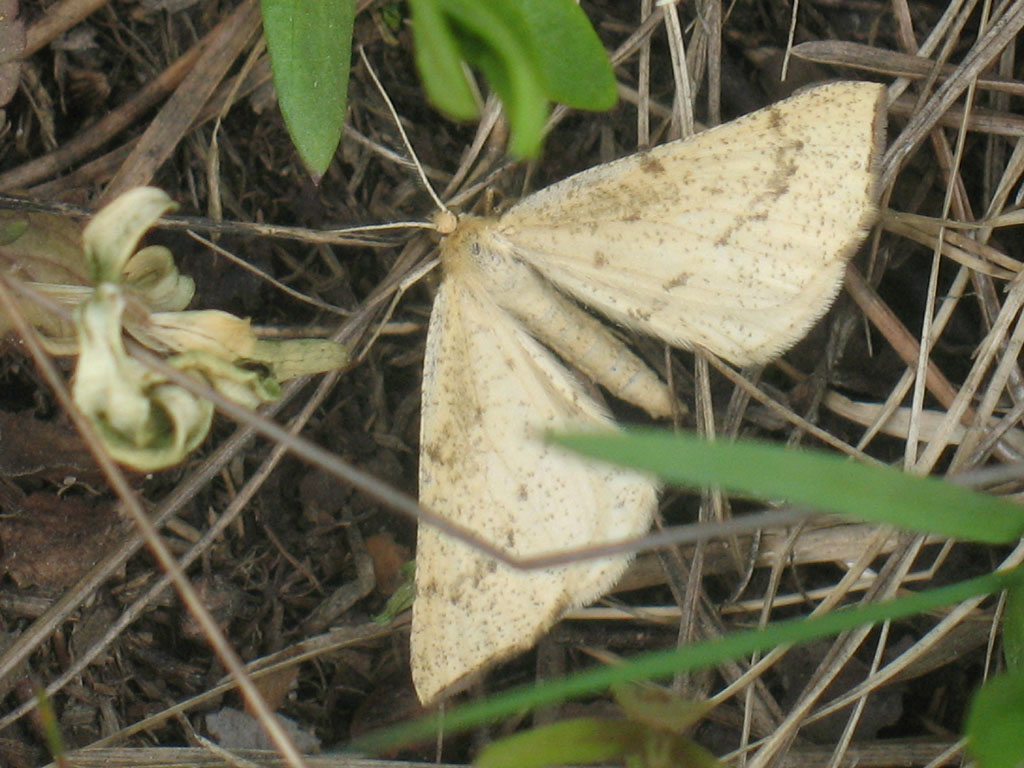
- Hypoxystis pluviaria ♂

Scientific classification
- Kingdom: Animalia
- Phylum: Arthropoda
- Class: Insecta
- Order: Lepidoptera
- Family: Geometridae
- Genus: Hypoxystis
- Species: H. pluviaria

Binomial name
- Hypoxystis pluviaria (Fabricius, 1787)

Synonyms
- Phalaena pluviaria Fabricius, 1787

= Hypoxystis pluviaria =

Species of moth

Hypoxystis pluviaria is a moth of the family Geometridae. It is found from Sweden and Finland, south to the Alps and east to Siberia and Mongolia.

The wingspan is 27–34 mm. There is one generation per year, with adults on wing from mid May to mid June.

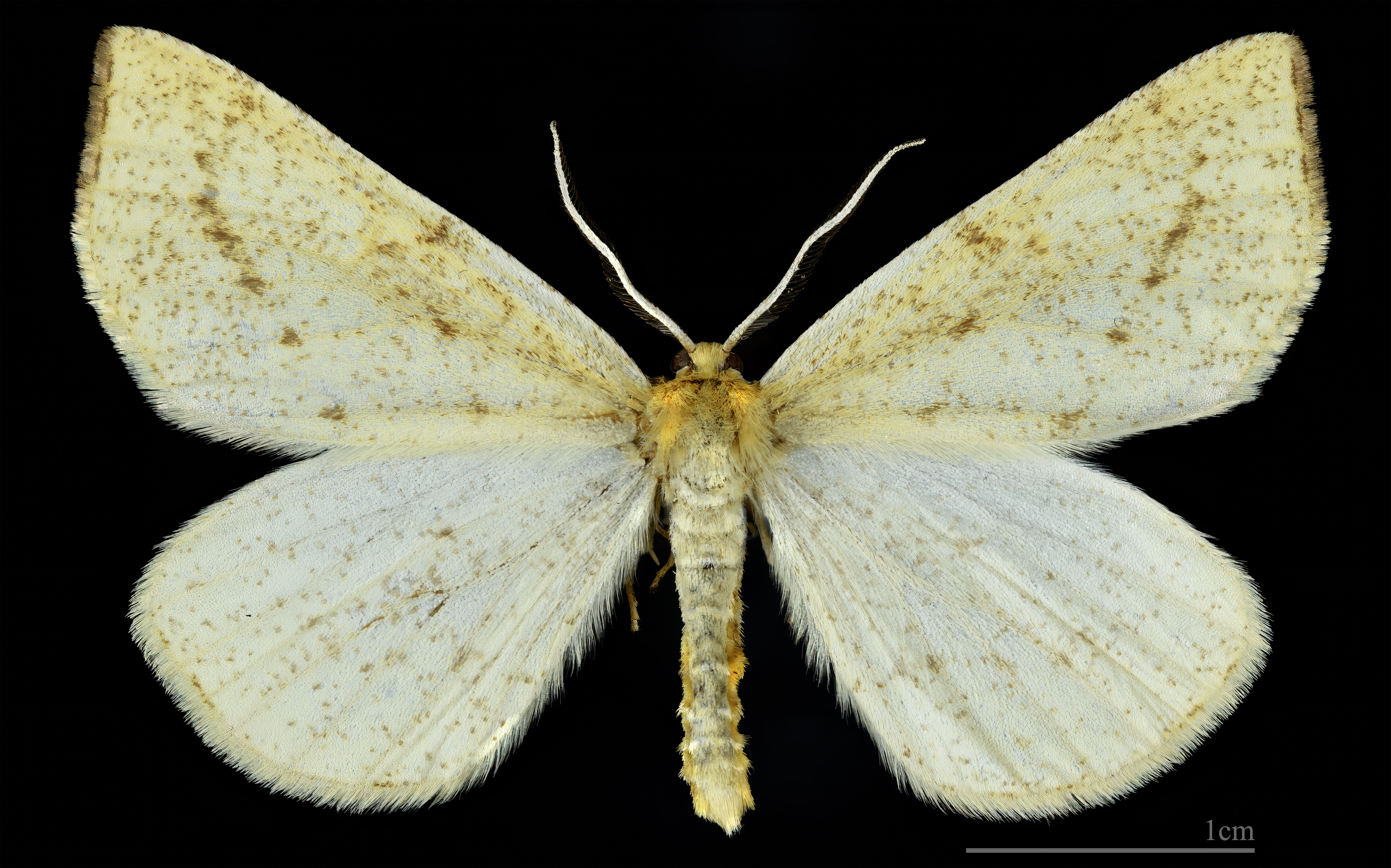
♂

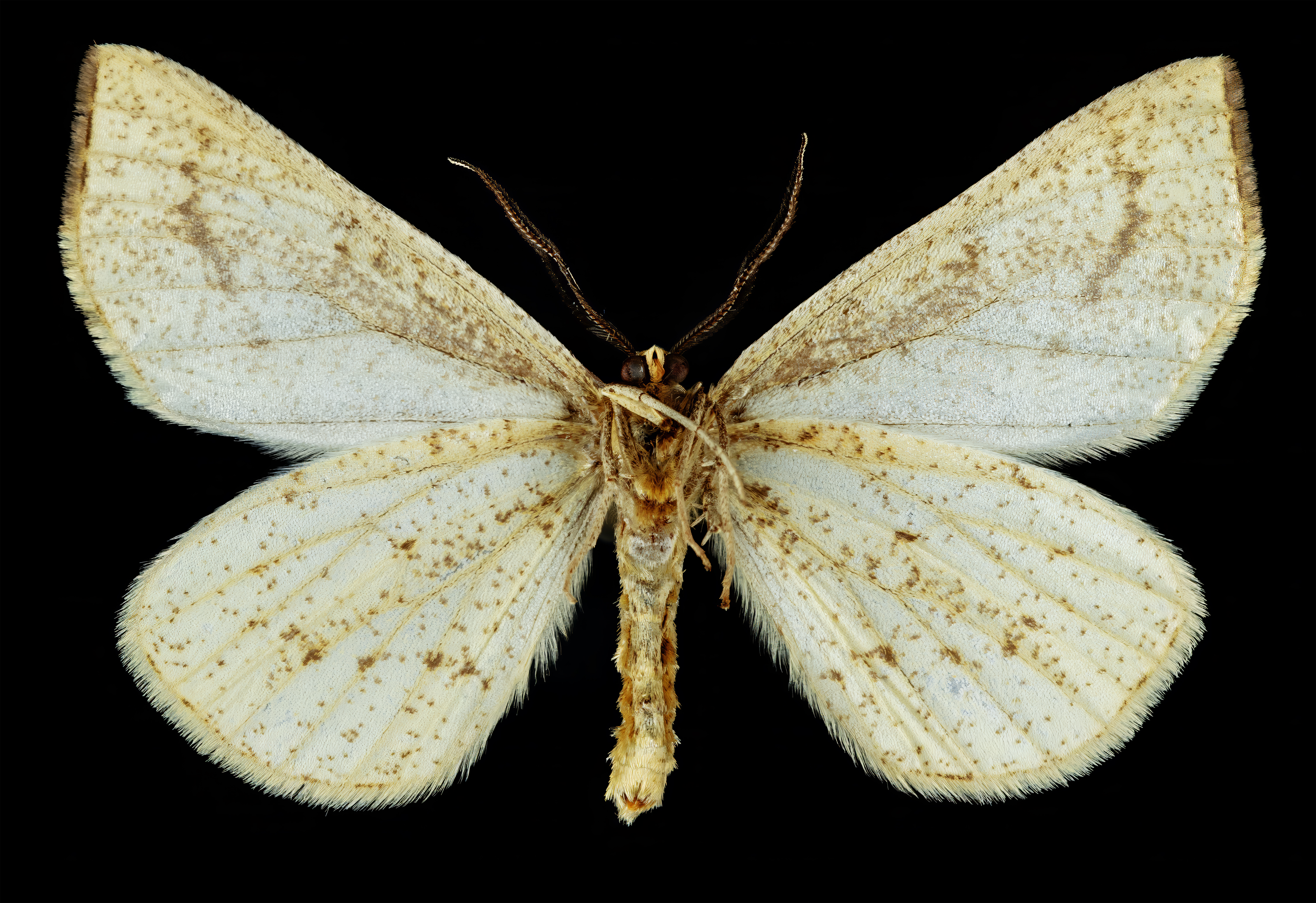
♂ △

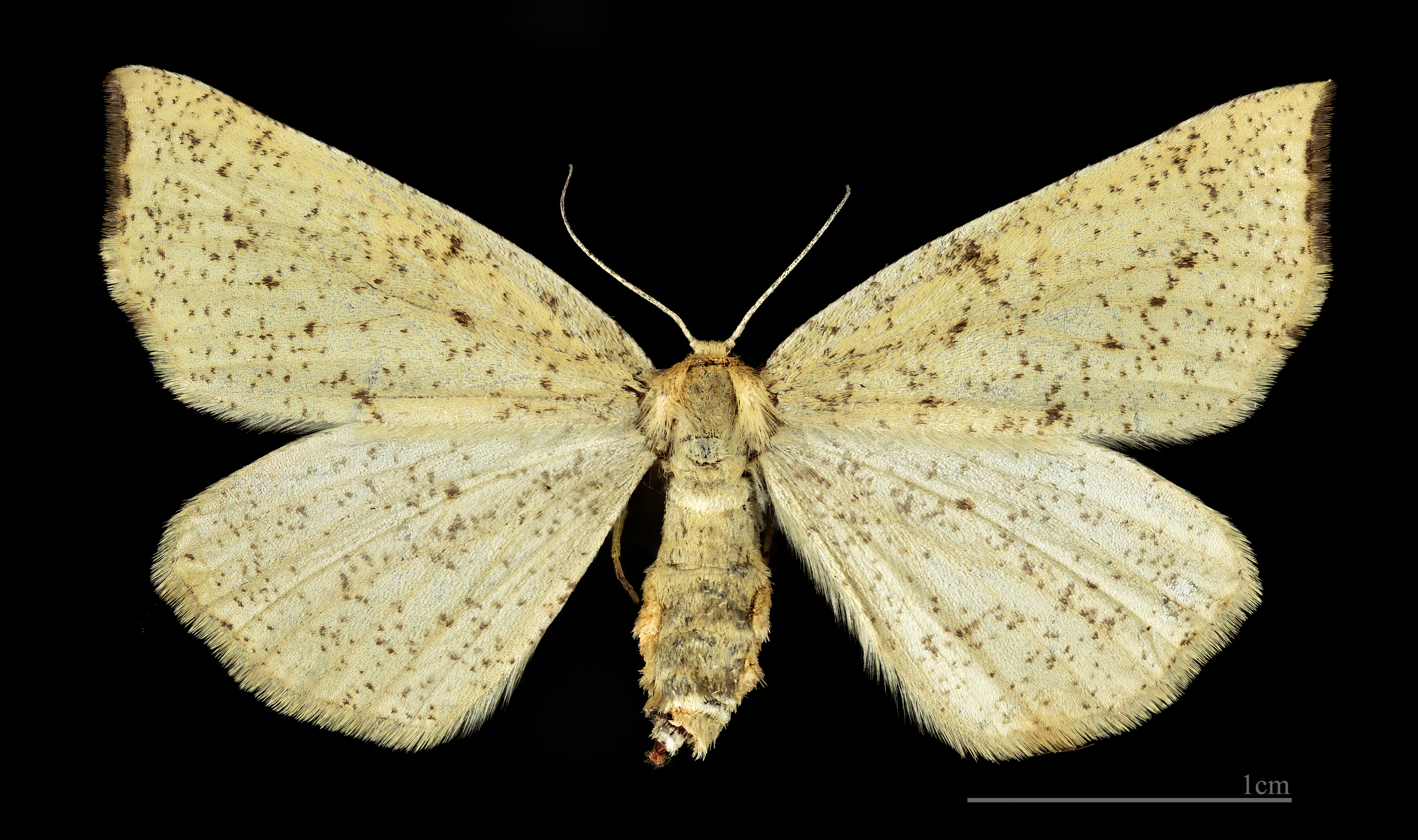
♀

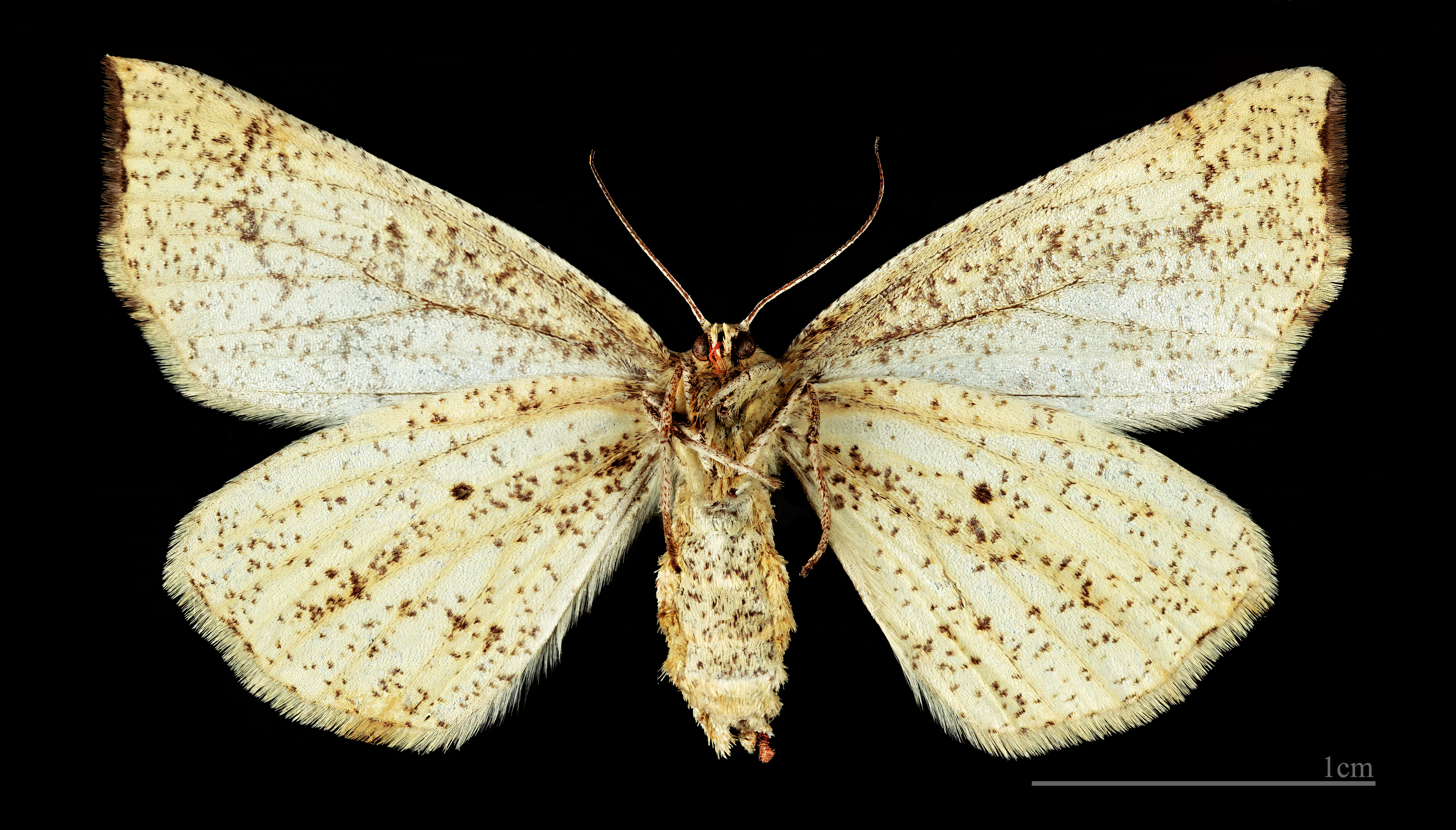
♀ △

The larvae feed on Filipendula ulmaria. Larvae can be found from mid June to the following spring. It overwinters as a full-grown larva.
