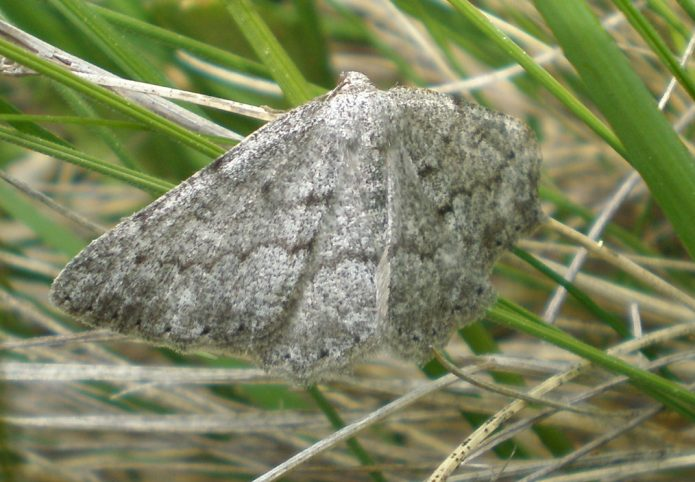

Scientific classification
- Domain: Eukaryota
- Kingdom: Animalia
- Phylum: Arthropoda
- Class: Insecta
- Order: Lepidoptera
- Family: Geometridae
- Genus: Elophos
- Species: E. dognini

Binomial name
- Elophos dognini (Thierry-Mieg, 1910)

Synonyms
- Gnophos dognini Thierry-Mieg, 1910; Gnophos distinctior Wehrli, 1922; Gnophos griseisparsa Wehrli, 1922; Gnophos serotinoides Wehrli, 1922

= Elophos dognini =

Species of moth

Elophos dognini is a moth of the family Geometridae. It is found in Spain, France, Andorra, Switzerland and Italy.

The wingspan is 18–20 mm. Adults are on wing from June to August.

The larvae feed on various low-growing plants.

== Subspecies ==
- Elophos dognini dognini
- Elophos dognini serotinoides Wehrli, 1922
