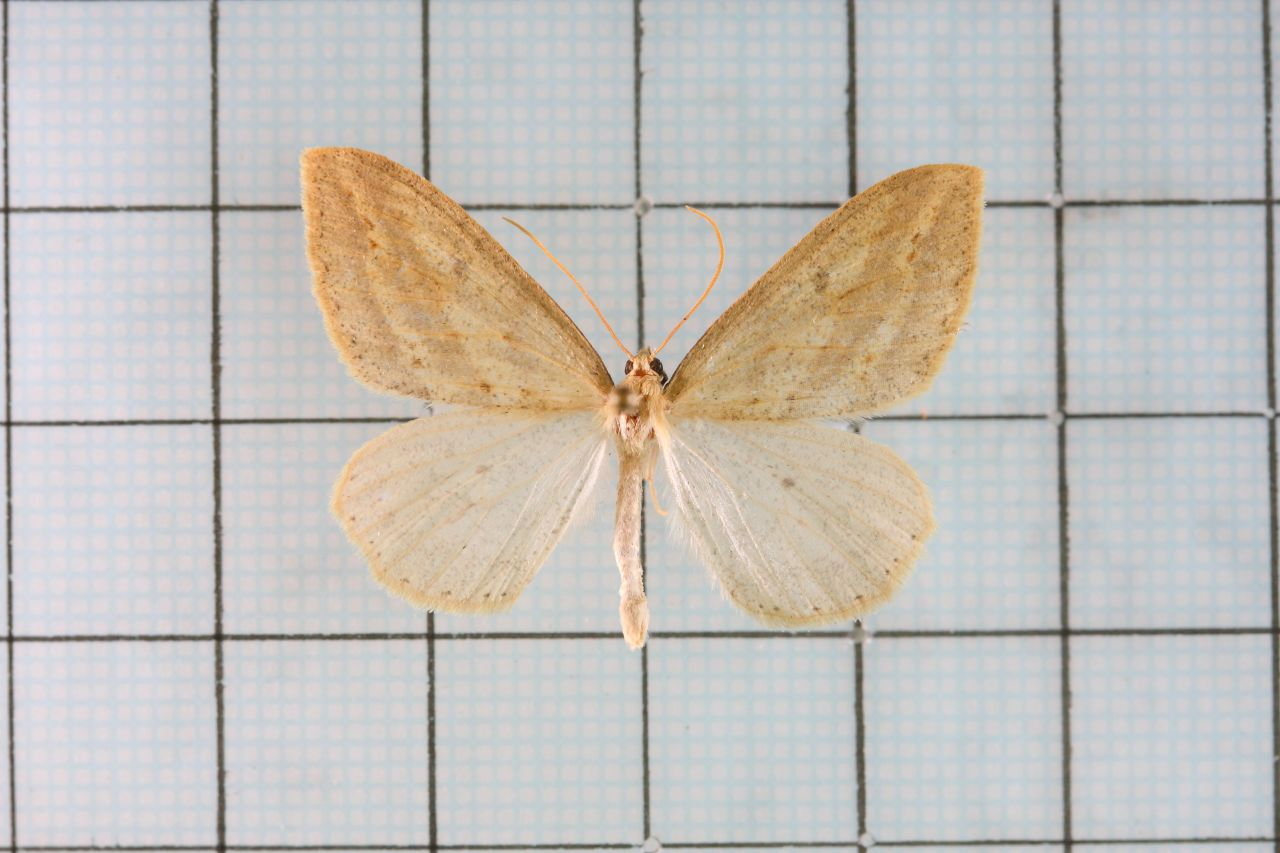

Scientific classification
- Kingdom: Animalia
- Phylum: Arthropoda
- Class: Insecta
- Order: Lepidoptera
- Family: Geometridae
- Genus: Loxaspilates
- Species: L. montuosa

Binomial name
- Loxaspilates montuosa Inoue, 1983

= Loxaspilates montuosa =

Species of moth

Loxaspilates montuosa is a species of moth in the family Geometridae. It is found in Taiwan.
