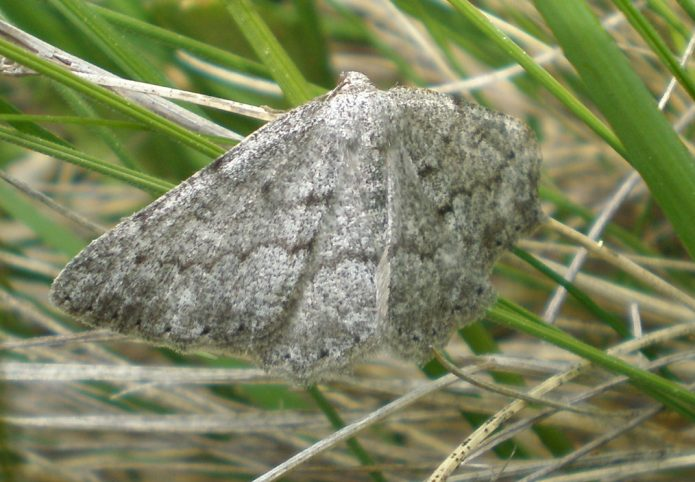
- Elophos dognini in Canillo, Andorra

Scientific classification
- Domain: Eukaryota
- Kingdom: Animalia
- Phylum: Arthropoda
- Class: Insecta
- Order: Lepidoptera
- Family: Geometridae
- Tribe: Gnophini
- Genus: Elophos; Boisduval, 1840

Synonyms
- Yezognophos Matsumura, 1927; Parietaria Leraut, 1981

= Elophos =

Genus of moths

Elophos is a genus of moths in the family Geometridae.

== Species ==
- Elophos andereggaria (La Harpe, 1853)
- Elophos barbarica Prout, 1915
- Elophos caelibaria (Heydenreich, 1851)
- Elophos dilucidaria (Denis & Schiffermüller, 1775)
- Elophos dognini (Thierry-Mieg, 1910)
- Elophos operaria (Hübner, 1813)
- Elophos serotinaria (Denis & Schiffermüller, 1775)
- Elophos sproengertsi (Püngeler, 1914)
- Elophos unicoloraria (Staudinger, 1871)
- Elophos vittaria (Thunberg, 1788)
- Elophos zelleraria (Freyer, 1836)
- Elophos zirbitzensis (Pieszcek, 1902)
