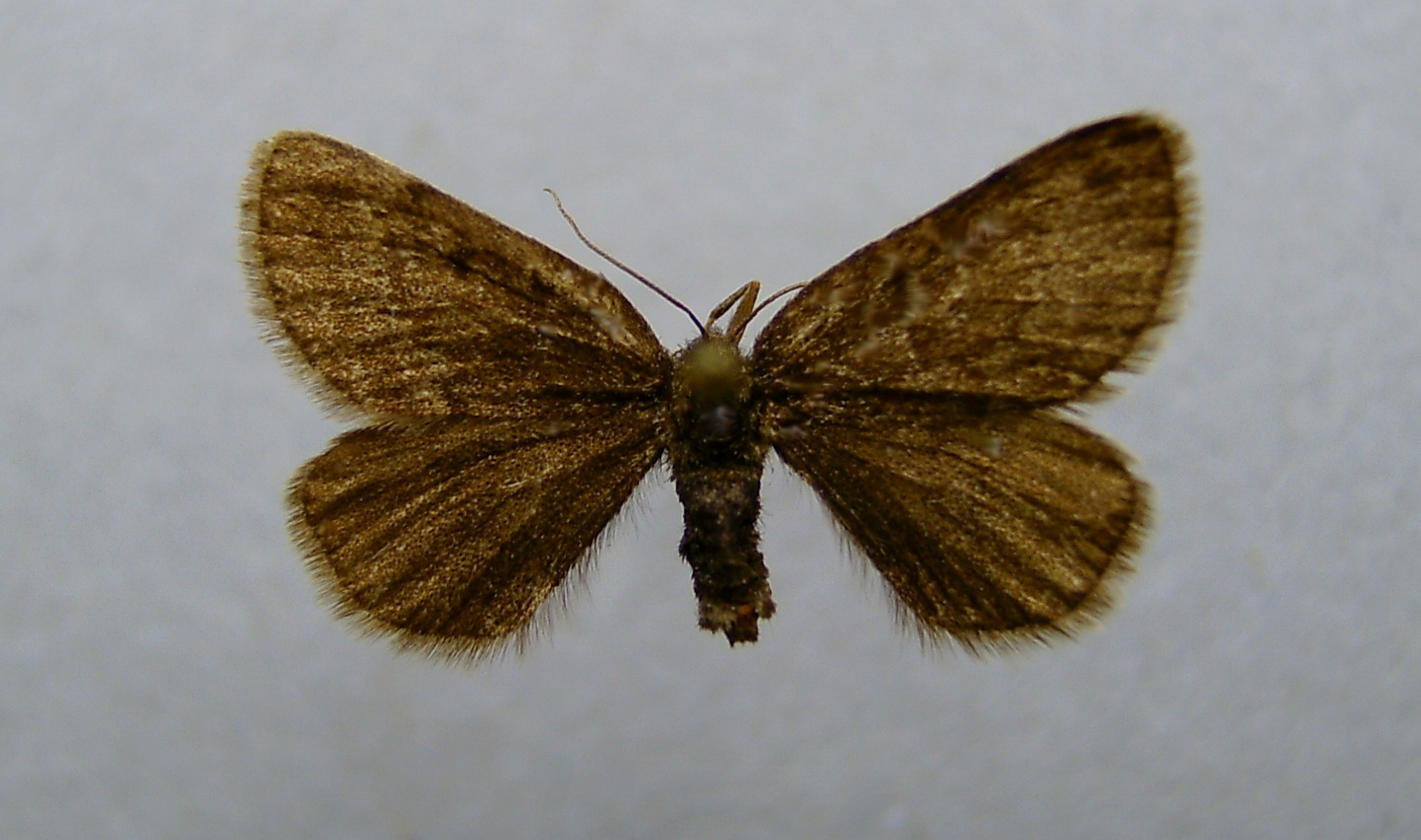

Scientific classification
- Domain: Eukaryota
- Kingdom: Animalia
- Phylum: Arthropoda
- Class: Insecta
- Order: Lepidoptera
- Family: Geometridae
- Genus: Glacies
- Species: G. alpinata

Binomial name
- Glacies alpinata (Scopoli, 1763)

Synonyms
- Phalaena (Noctua) alpinata Scopoli, 1763

= Glacies alpinata =

Species of moth

Glacies alpinata is a moth of the family Geometridae. It was described by Scopoli in 1763. It is found in Alps, the Czech Republic, Poland, Romania and Slovakia. It is found on altitudes of up to 3,000 metres (9,800 ft).

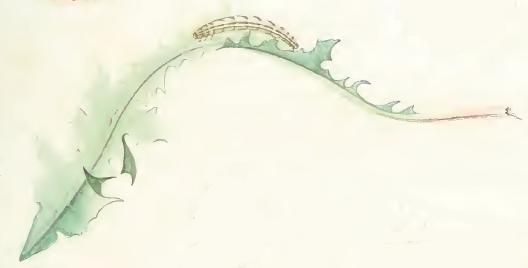
Larva

The wingspan is 18–24 millimetres (0.71–0.94 in). Adults are on wing from June to September and are day active.

The larva feeds on the leaves of various low-growing plants.
