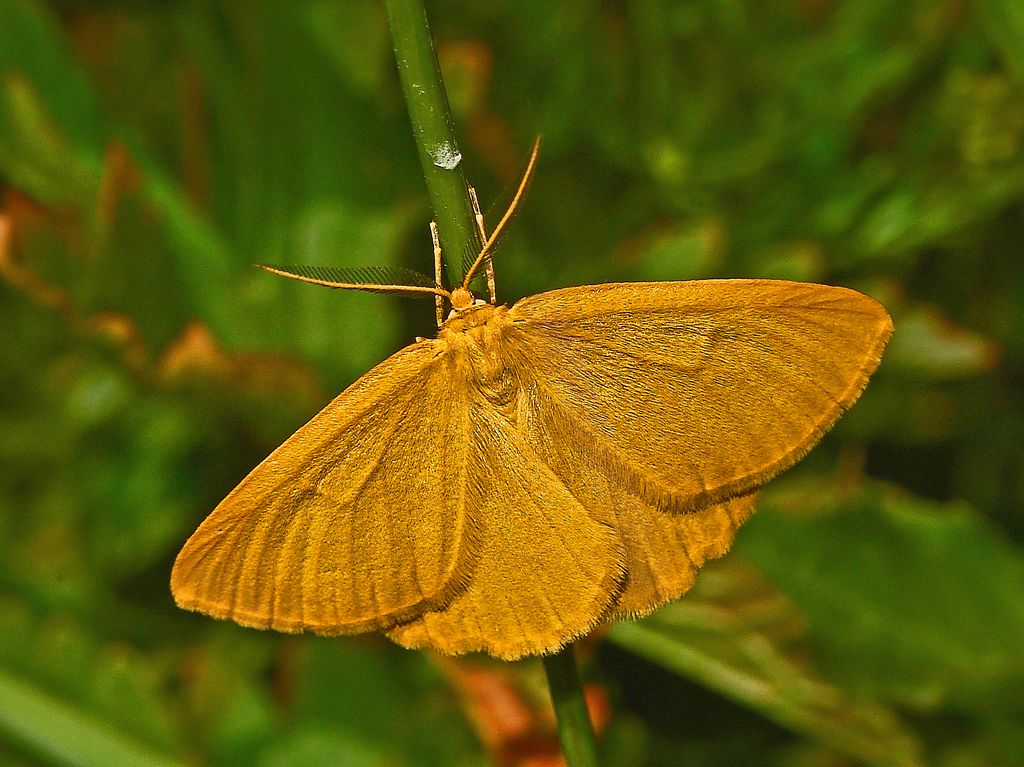
- Male

Scientific classification
- Domain: Eukaryota
- Kingdom: Animalia
- Phylum: Arthropoda
- Class: Insecta
- Order: Lepidoptera
- Family: Geometridae
- Genus: Crocota
- Species: C. tinctaria

Binomial name
- Crocota tinctaria (Hübner, 1799)

Synonyms
- Geometra tinctaria Hubner, 1799; Phalaena lutearia Fabricius, 1794; Cleogene lutearia

= Crocota tinctaria =

Species of moth

Crocota tinctaria is a moth of the family Geometridae first described by Jacob Hübner in 1799. It is found in France, Italy, Switzerland and Austria.

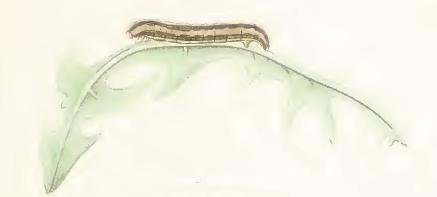
Larva

The wingspan is 29–35 mm. Adults are on wing in June, July and August.

The larvae feed on Polygonum bistorta, Gentiana, Leontodon, Rumex, Plantago, and Taraxacum species.
