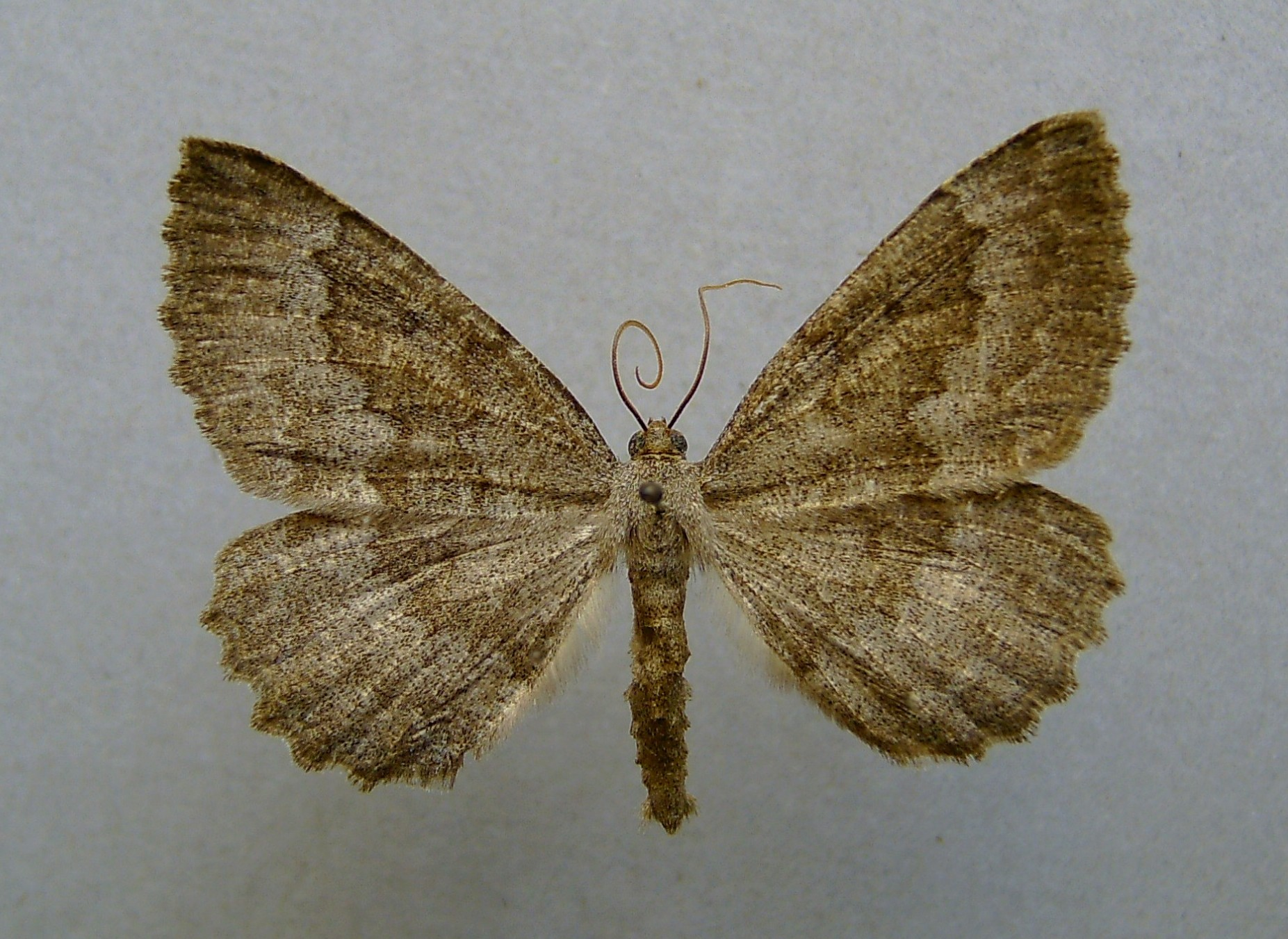

Scientific classification
- Kingdom: Animalia
- Phylum: Arthropoda
- Clade: Pancrustacea
- Class: Insecta
- Order: Lepidoptera
- Family: Geometridae
- Genus: Gnophos
- Species: G. furvata

Binomial name
- Gnophos furvata (Denis & Schiffermüller, 1775)

Synonyms
- Geometra furvata Denis & Schiffermüller, 1775; Phalaena denticulata de Villers, 1789; Gnophos meridionalis Wehrli, 1924; Geometra cinerascens Turati, 1919

= Gnophos furvata =

Species of moth

Gnophos furvata is a species of moth in the family Geometridae. It is found in southern and central Europe. In the east, the range extends to the Carpathian Mountains and Ukraine.

The wingspan is 38–52 mm. Adults have been recorded feeding on the nectar of Eupatorium cannabinum and Silene species. They are on wing from June to September.

The larvae feed on the leaves of various plants, including Prunus spinosa, Cornus sanguinea, Clematis vitalba, Coronilla coronata and Hippocrepis comosa. The larvae can be found in late summer. The species overwinters in the larval stage. Pupation takes place in June of the following year.

== Subspecies ==
- Gnophos furvata furvata
- Gnophos furvata cinerascens (Turati, 1919)
