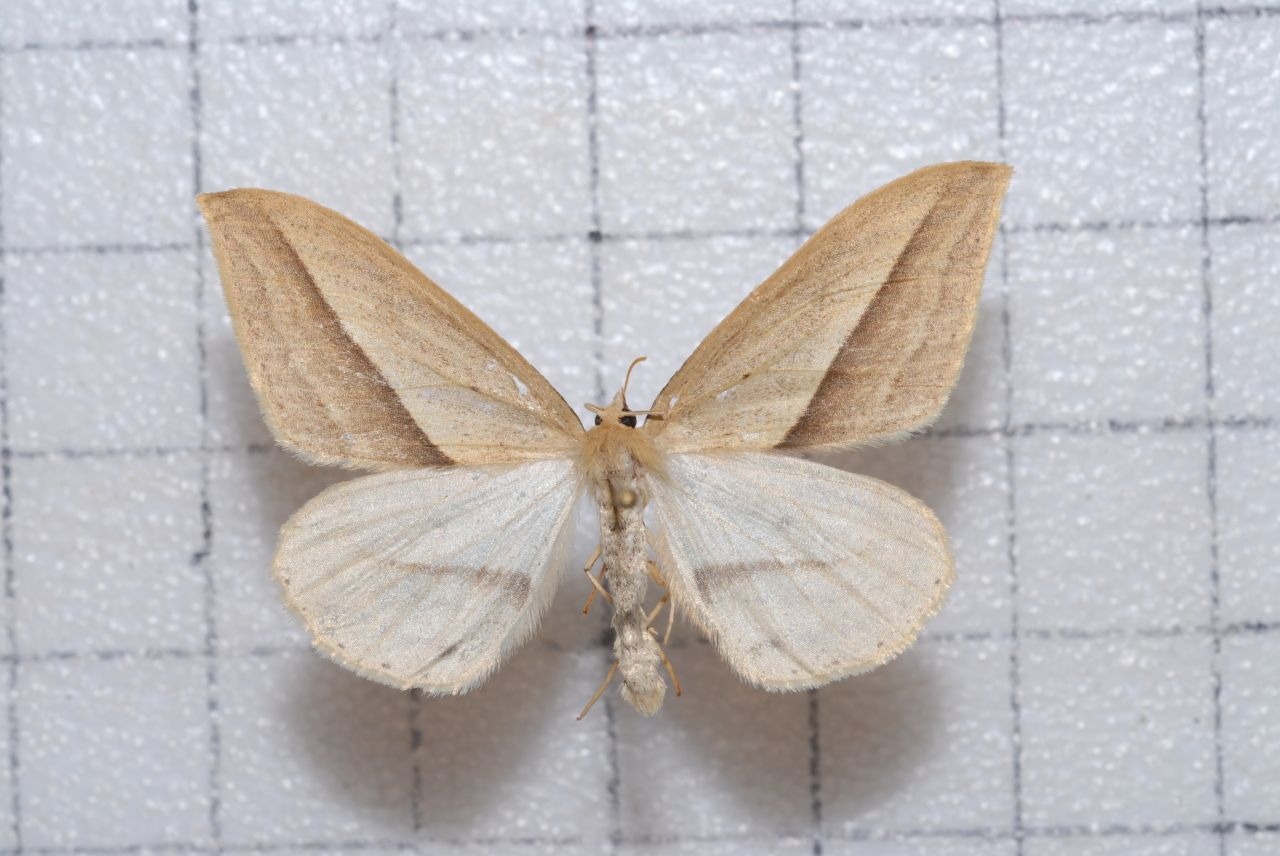

Scientific classification
- Kingdom: Animalia
- Phylum: Arthropoda
- Class: Insecta
- Order: Lepidoptera
- Family: Geometridae
- Genus: Loxaspilates
- Species: L. arrizanaria

Binomial name
- Loxaspilates arrizanaria Bastelberger, 1909

Synonyms
- Loxaspilates arisana Matsumura, 1931; Loxaspilates arisanaria Bastelberger, 1909

= Loxaspilates arrizanaria =

Species of moth

Loxaspilates arrizanaria is a moth in the family Geometridae. It is found in Taiwan.
