= Ctenognophos =

Scientific classification
- Kingdom: Animalia
- Phylum: Arthropoda
- Clade: Pancrustacea
- Class: Insecta
- Order: Lepidoptera
- Family: Geometridae
- Tribe: Gnophini
- Genus: Ctenognophos; Prout, 1915

Genus of moths

Ctenognophos is a genus of moths in the family Geometridae.

== Species ==
- Ctenognophos burmesteri (Graeser, 1888)
- Ctenognophos eolaria (Guenée, 1857)
- Ctenognophos solianikovi (Viidalepp, 1988)
- Ctenognophos tetarte (Wehrli, 1931)
