= Apoaspilates =

Scientific classification
- Kingdom: Animalia
- Phylum: Arthropoda
- Class: Insecta
- Order: Lepidoptera
- Family: Geometridae
- Tribe: Gnophini
- Genus: Apoaspilates; Wehrli, 1954

Genus of geometer moths

Apoaspilates is a genus of moths in the family Geometridae.

== Species ==
- Apoaspilates tristrigaria (Bremer & Grey, 1853)
