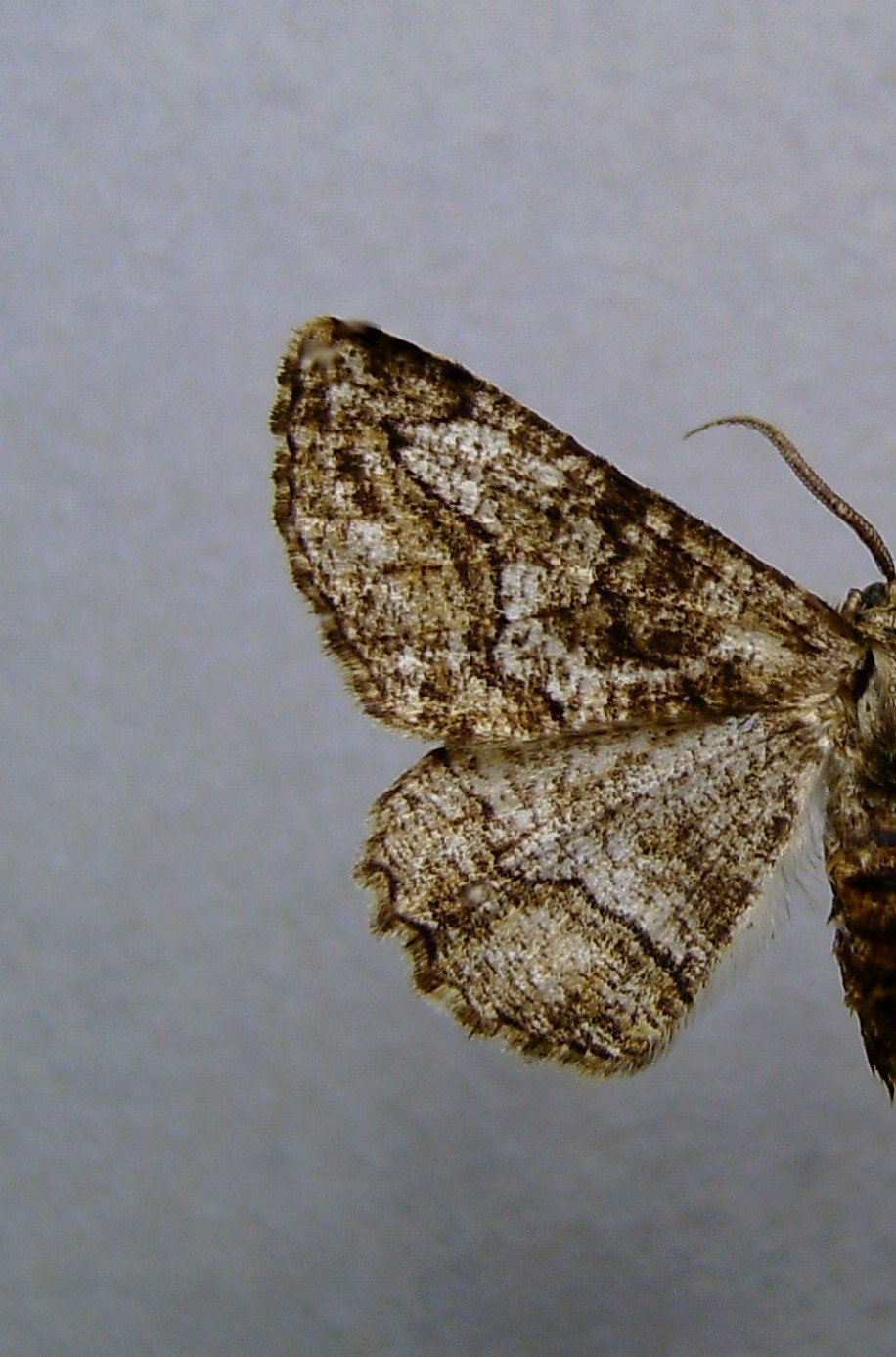
- Synopsia sociaria

Scientific classification
- Kingdom: Animalia
- Phylum: Arthropoda
- Clade: Pancrustacea
- Class: Insecta
- Order: Lepidoptera
- Family: Geometridae
- Tribe: Boarmiini
- Genus: Synopsia; Hübner, 1825

= Synopsia (moth) =

Genus of moths

Synopsia is a genus of moths in the family Geometridae erected by Jacob Hübner in 1825.

== Species ==
- Synopsia sociaria (Hübner, 1799)
- Synopsia strictaria (Lederer, 1853)
