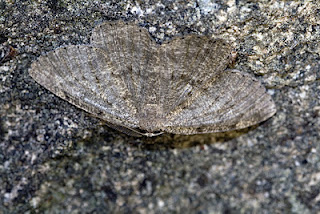

Scientific classification
- Kingdom: Animalia
- Phylum: Arthropoda
- Clade: Pancrustacea
- Class: Insecta
- Order: Lepidoptera
- Family: Geometridae
- Genus: Gnophos
- Species: G. dumetata

Binomial name
- Gnophos dumetata Treitschke, 1827

Synonyms
- Odontognophos dumetata; Ennomos daubearia Boisduval, 1840; Odonthognophos hibernica Forder, 1993; Gnophos margaritatus Zerny, 1927

= Gnophos dumetata =

Species of moth

Gnophos dumetata, the Irish annulet, is a species of moth in the family Geometridae. It is found in large parts of Europe (including Western Russia and Ukraine), except Great Britain, Portugal, the Benelux, Switzerland, Bulgaria, Fennoscandia and the Baltic region. It is also found from north-western Africa to Armenia, Dagestan, and the south-western part of the former Soviet Union.

The wingspan is 24–28 mm. "Larger than stevenaria (Gnopharmia stevenaria), more brownish, with less enlarged costal spots, upperside usually with conspicuous discal dots, that of the forewing sometimes lost in the median shade. Underside without darkened distal area, postmedian line usually indicated by vein-dots.".

Adults are on the wing in August.

The larvae feed on buckthorn leaves.

== Subspecies ==
- Gnophos dumetata dumetata
- Gnophos dumetata daubearia (Boisduval, 1840)
- Gnophos dumetata hibernica (Forder, 1993) (Ireland)
- Gnophos dumetata margaritatus (Zerny, 1927)
