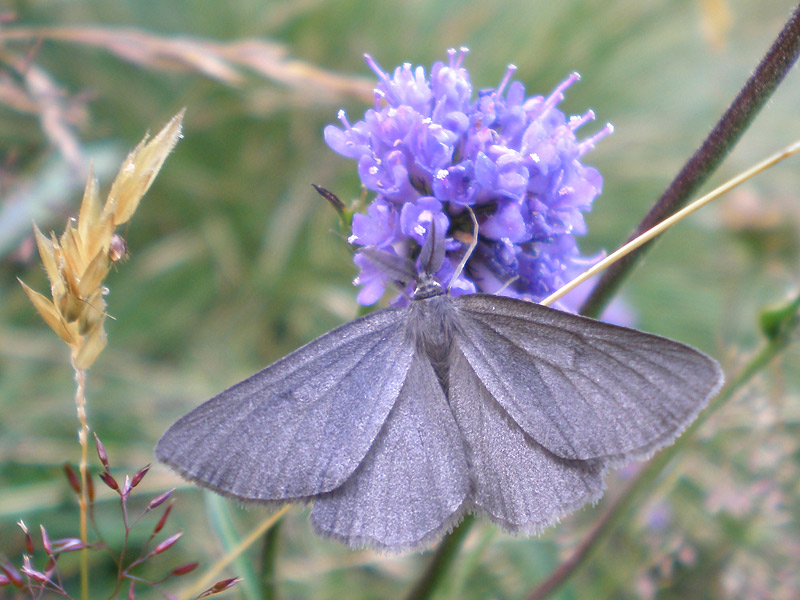
- Crocota peletieraria (El Tarter, Andorra)

Scientific classification
- Kingdom: Animalia
- Phylum: Arthropoda
- Clade: Pancrustacea
- Class: Insecta
- Order: Lepidoptera
- Family: Geometridae
- Subfamily: Ennominae
- Tribe: Boarmiini
- Genus: Crocota; Hübner, 1823

Synonyms
- Cleogene Duponchel, 1829

= Crocota =

Genus of moths

Crocota is a genus of moths in the family Geometridae.

== Species ==
- Crocota niveata (Scopoli, 1763)
- Crocota ostrogovichi Caradja, 1930
- Crocota peletieraria (Duponchel, 1830)
- Crocota pseudotinctaria Leraut, 1999
- Crocota tinctaria (Hübner, 1799)
