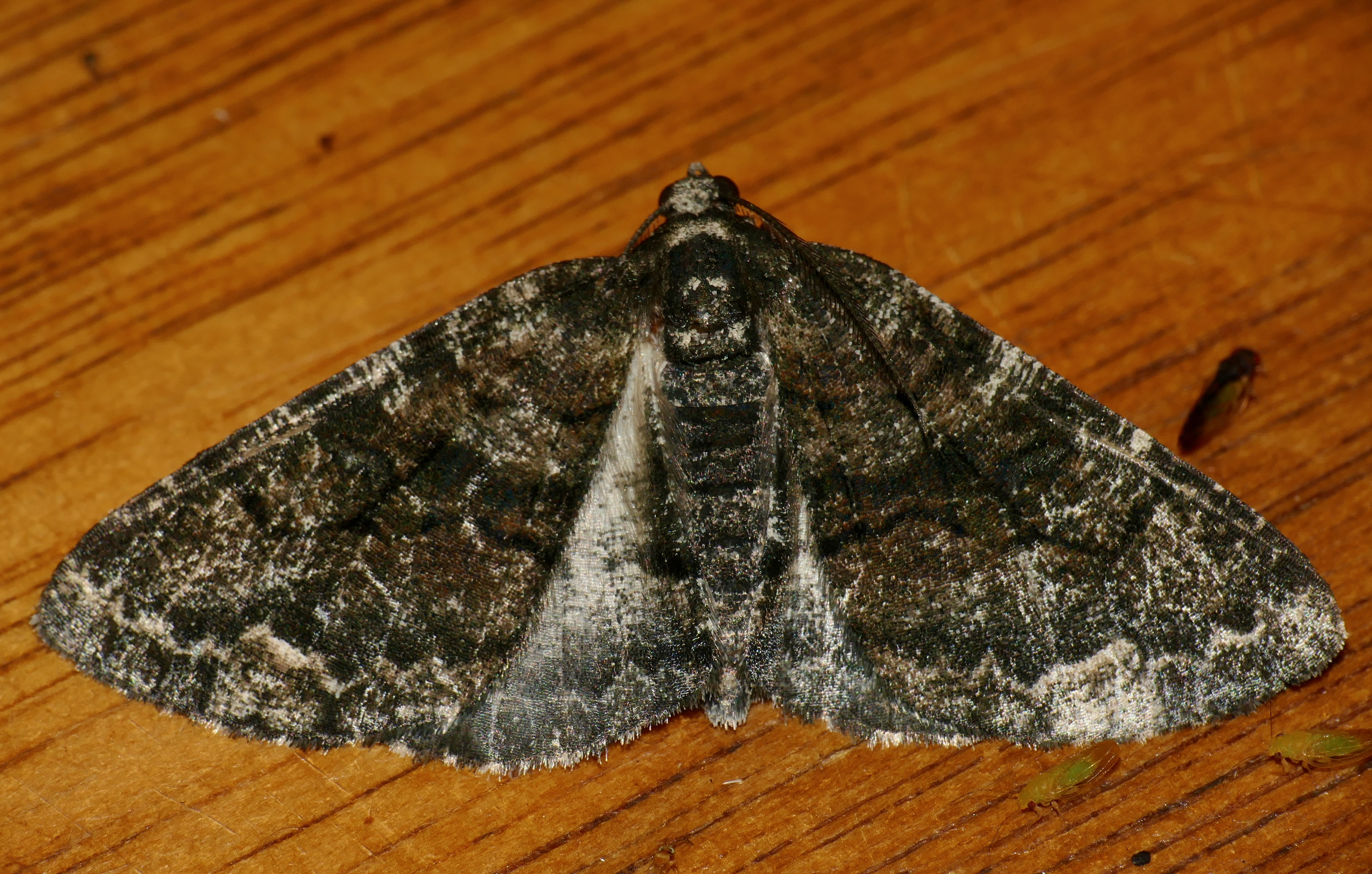
- P. pinguis

Scientific classification
- Kingdom: Animalia
- Phylum: Arthropoda
- Clade: Pancrustacea
- Class: Insecta
- Order: Lepidoptera
- Family: Geometridae
- Genus: Phthonandria; Warren, 1894

Type species
- Hemerophila atrilineata Butler, 1881

= Phthonandria =

Genus of moths

Phthonandria is a genus of moths in the family Geometridae. It was described by Warren in 1894.

== Species ==
Some species of this genus are:

- Phthonandria atrilineata (Butler, 1881) (India, Japan)
- Phthonandria brandti (Wehrli, 1941)
- Phthonandria conjunctiva Warren, 1896 (India)
- Phthonandria emaria (Bremer, 1864)
- Phthonandria lederi (Christoph, 1887)
- Phthonandria potopolskii (Viidalepp, 1988)
