= Synopsidia =

Scientific classification
- Kingdom: Animalia
- Phylum: Arthropoda
- Clade: Pancrustacea
- Class: Insecta
- Order: Lepidoptera
- Family: Geometridae
- Genus: Synopsidia

Species
- Synopsidia znojkoi Djakonov (1935)

Genus of moths

Synopsidia is a genus of moths in the family Geometridae. It is found in Azerbaijan.
