= Diaprepesilla =

Scientific classification
- Kingdom: Animalia
- Phylum: Arthropoda
- Class: Insecta
- Order: Lepidoptera
- Family: Geometridae
- Subfamily: Ennominae
- Genus: Diaprepesilla; Wehrli, 1937

Genus of moths

Diaprepesilla is a genus of moths in the family Geometridae.

== Species ==
- Diaprepesilla flavomarginaria (Bremer, 1864)
