= Descoreba =

Scientific classification
- Kingdom: Animalia
- Phylum: Arthropoda
- Class: Insecta
- Order: Lepidoptera
- Family: Geometridae
- Subfamily: Ennominae
- Genus: Descoreba; Butler, 1878

Genus of moths

Descoreba is a genus of moths in the family Geometridae.

== Species ==
- Descoreba simplex Butler, 1878
