= Megaspilates =

Scientific classification
- Kingdom: Animalia
- Phylum: Arthropoda
- Class: Insecta
- Order: Lepidoptera
- Family: Geometridae
- Tribe: Aspitatini
- Genus: Megaspilates

Genus of moths

Megaspilates is a genus of moths and butterflies in the family Geometridae. According to the Natural History Museum, there is only one species within the family of geometridae.
