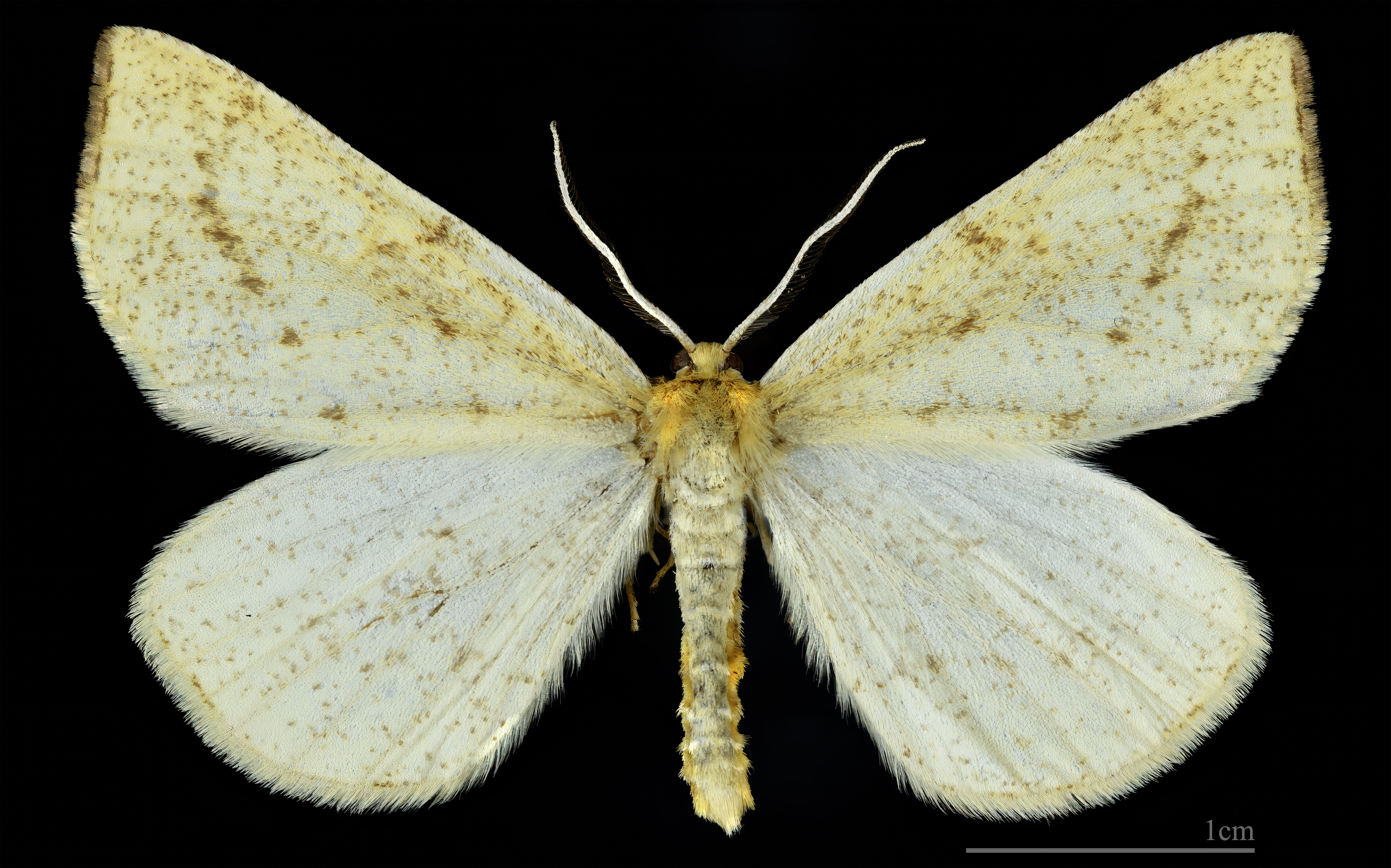
- Hypoxystis pluviaria ♂

Scientific classification
- Kingdom: Animalia
- Phylum: Arthropoda
- Clade: Pancrustacea
- Class: Insecta
- Order: Lepidoptera
- Family: Geometridae
- Subfamily: Ennominae
- Genus: Hypoxystis; Prout, 1915

= Hypoxystis =

Genus of moths

Hypoxystis is a genus of moths in the family Geometridae, described by Prout in 1915.

== Species ==
- Hypoxystis mandli Schawerda, 1924
- Hypoxystis pluviaria (Fabricius, 1787)
- Hypoxystis pulcherata (Herz, 1905)
