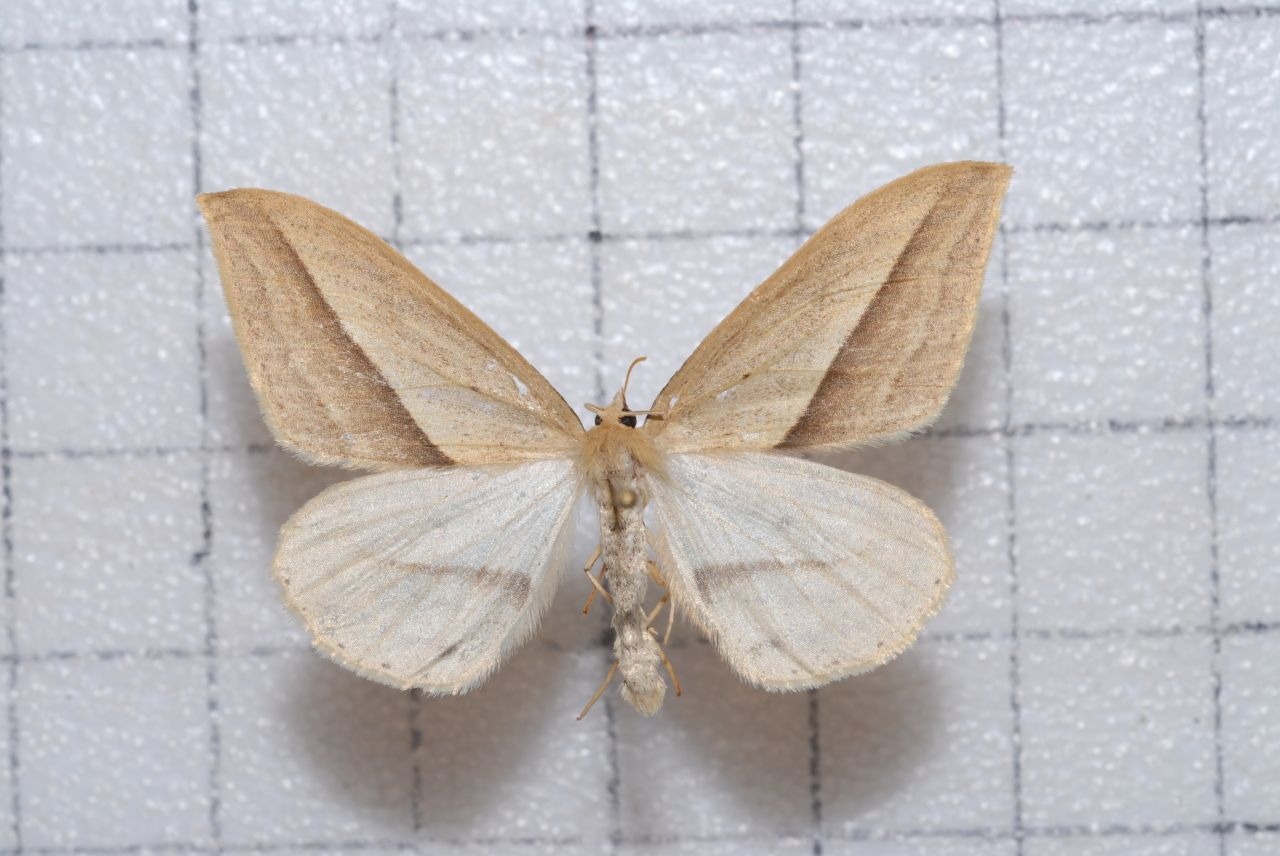
- Loxaspilates arrizanaria

Scientific classification
- Kingdom: Animalia
- Phylum: Arthropoda
- Class: Insecta
- Order: Lepidoptera
- Family: Geometridae
- Subfamily: Ennominae
- Genus: Loxaspilates; Warren, 1893

= Loxaspilates =

Genus of moths

Loxaspilates is a genus of moths in the family Geometridae.

== Species ==
- Loxaspilates arrizanaria Bastelberger, 1909
- Loxaspilates atrisquamata Hampson, 1907
- Loxaspilates biformata Inoue, 1983
- Loxaspilates densihastigera Inoue, 1983
- Loxaspilates dispar Warren, 1893
- Loxaspilates duplicata Sterneck, 1928
- Loxaspilates fixseni (Alpheraky, 1892)
- Loxaspilates formosanus Matsumura, 1911
- Loxaspilates graeseri Prout, 1920
- Loxaspilates hastigera (Butler, 1889)
- Loxaspilates imitata (Bastelberger, 1909)
- Loxaspilates montuosa Inoue, 1983
- Loxaspilates nakajimai Inoue, 1983
- Loxaspilates obliquaria (Moore, 1868)
- Loxaspilates straminearia Leech, 1897
- Loxaspilates tenuipicta Wehrli, 1953
- Loxaspilates torcida Dognin, 1900
- Loxaspilates triumbrata (Warren, 1895)
- Loxaspilates unidiluta Inoue, 1987
