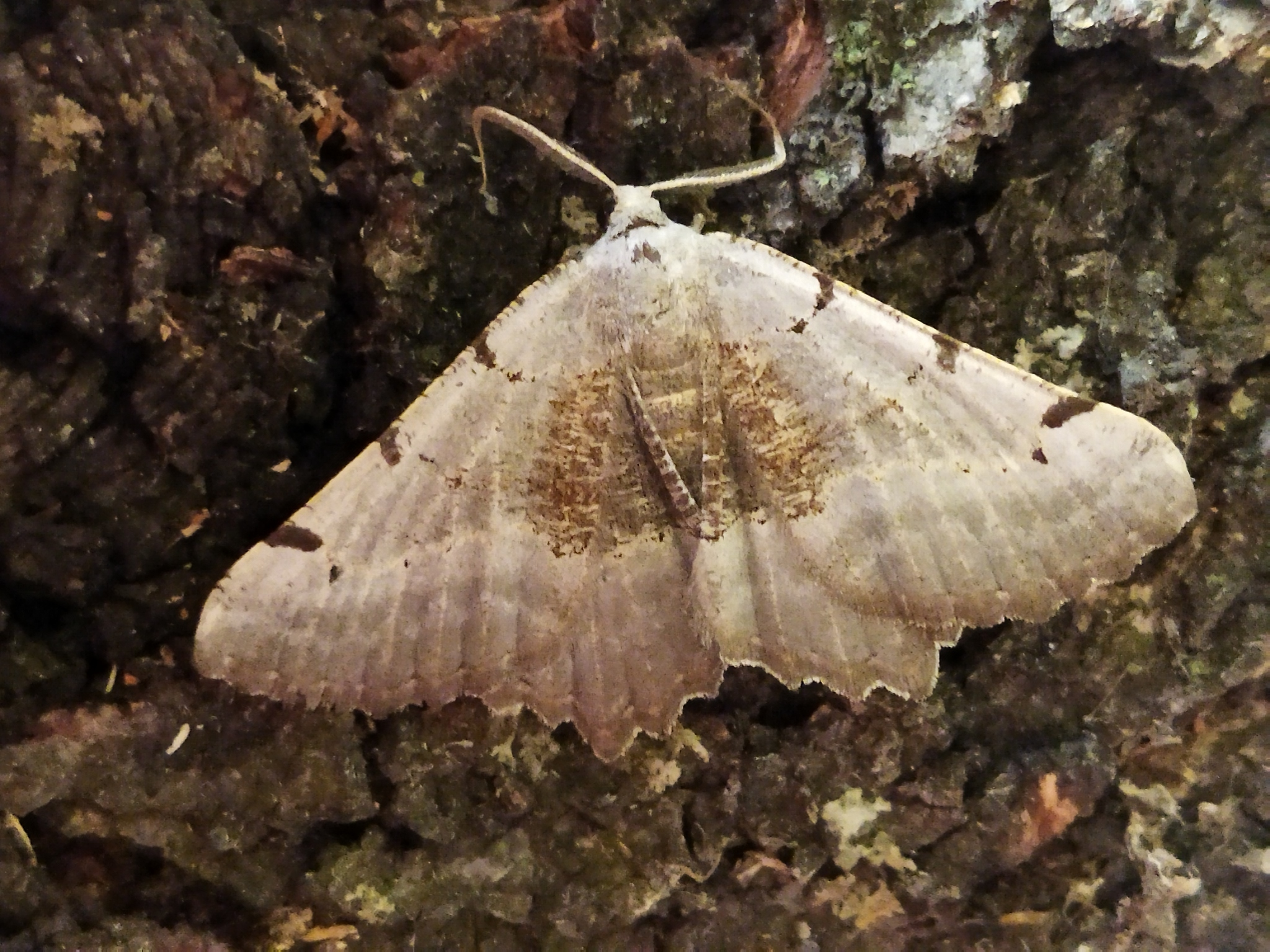
- Neognopharmia stevenaria

Scientific classification
- Kingdom: Animalia
- Phylum: Arthropoda
- Class: Insecta
- Order: Lepidoptera
- Family: Geometridae
- Genus: Neognopharmia; Wehrli, 1951

= Neognopharmia =

Genus of moths

Neognopharmia is a genus of moths in the family Geometridae.

== Species ==
The following species are recognised in the genus Neognopharmia:

- Neognopharmia hoerhammeri (Brandt, 1938)
- Neognopharmia stevenaria (Boisduval, 1840)
- BOLD:AAE1571 (Neognopharmia sp.)
