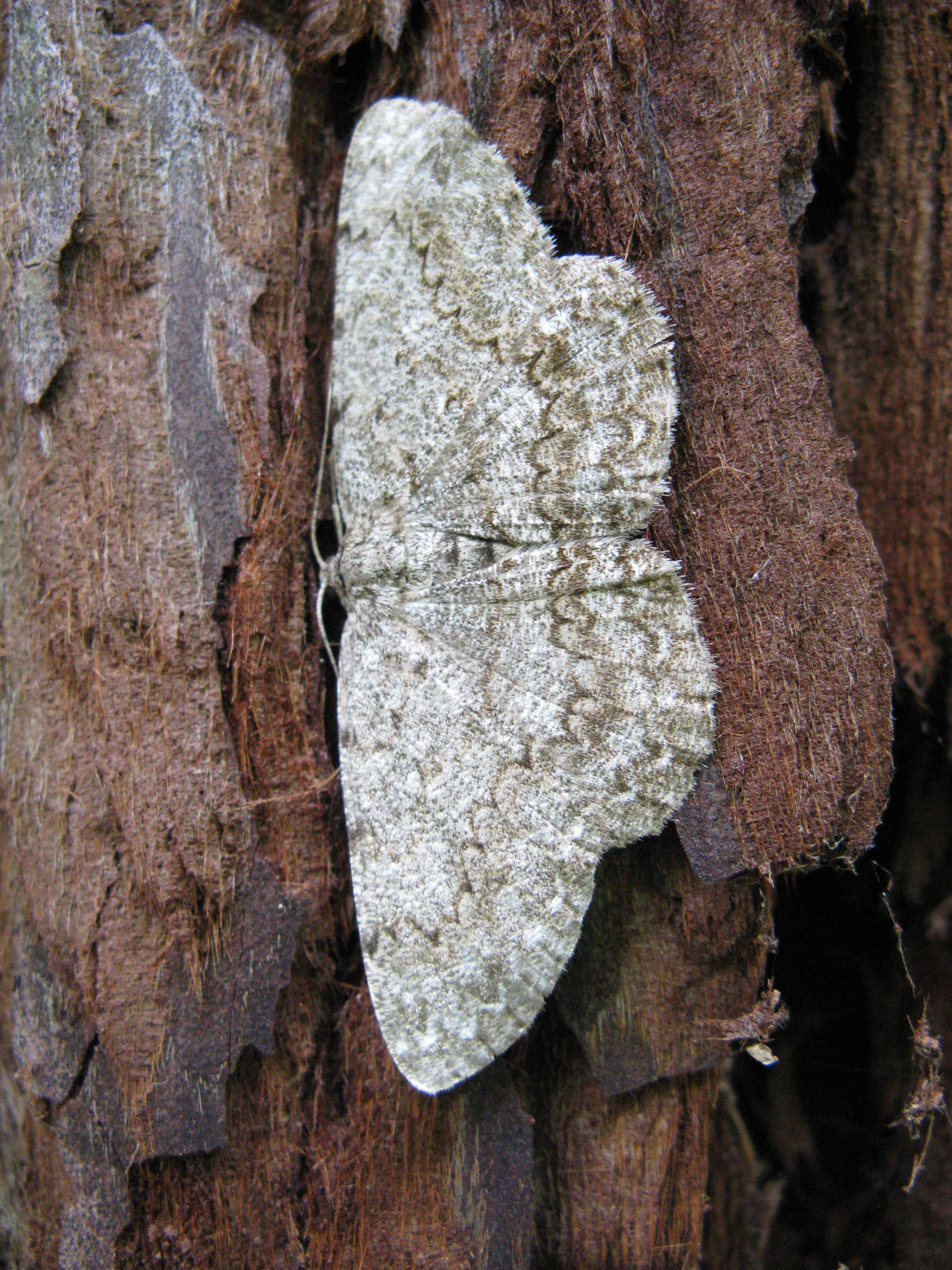
- Adult Hypomecis lunifera in Osaka (Japan)

Scientific classification
- Domain: Eukaryota
- Kingdom: Animalia
- Phylum: Arthropoda
- Class: Insecta
- Order: Lepidoptera
- Family: Geometridae
- Subfamily: Ennominae
- Tribe: Boarmiini; Duponchel, 1845

Genera
- Many, see text

Synonyms
- Ascotinae Warren, 1893; Ascotini Warren, 1893; Boarmites Duponchel, 1845; Cleorini Duponchel, 1845; Cleorites Duponchel, 1845; Fidoniini Duponchel, 1845; Fidonites Duponchel, 1845 and see text

= Boarmiini =

Tribe of moths

The Boarmiini (also often called Cleorini) are a large tribe of geometer moths in the Ennominae subfamily.

== Description and systematics ==
This family is sometimes massively expanded, with the closely related Bistonini, Bupalini, Erannini, Gnophini, Melanolophini, Phaseliini and Theriini all merged into it. The eggs of all these geometer moths have the chorion cells characteristically arranged in longitudinal rows. The eggs of the Boarmiini in the narrow sense usually have a typical slender and narrow shape, with a soft chorion consisting of heavy-walled but unridged polygonal cells. However, in Cleora for example, the eggs approach the wide-walled shape found in many Bistonini. Adding further to the uncertainty is the fact that the Alsophilinae, usually treated as a small subfamily in their own right, might be a specialized lineage of Boarmiini; though their caterpillars are quite different, their pupae have a peculiar T-shaped cremaster which very much resembles that of the Boarmiini.

Boarmiini in the narrow sense are typically slender geometer moths that rest with the wings spread out flatly and do not tuck the hindwings under the forewings while at rest. Typically, they are cryptically colored and rather dark, with brownish-grey hues predominating; in many, there are two or three weak wavy bands extending across the wings and forming a rough semicircle when the moths are at rest. Though they all look quite similar in habitus, there are few unequivocal characters that can be easily used to recognize adult members of this tribe. The females of many species have a conspicuously long ovipositor for hiding away the typical soft-shelled eggs. The valva and harpe (or "clasper") of the male genitalia are highly complex in almost all species and often bear various extensions. The juxta is typically well-developed, large and extended. Their caterpillars are rarely plump, and apparently at least some mimic twigs or thin leaves.

=== Selected genera ===
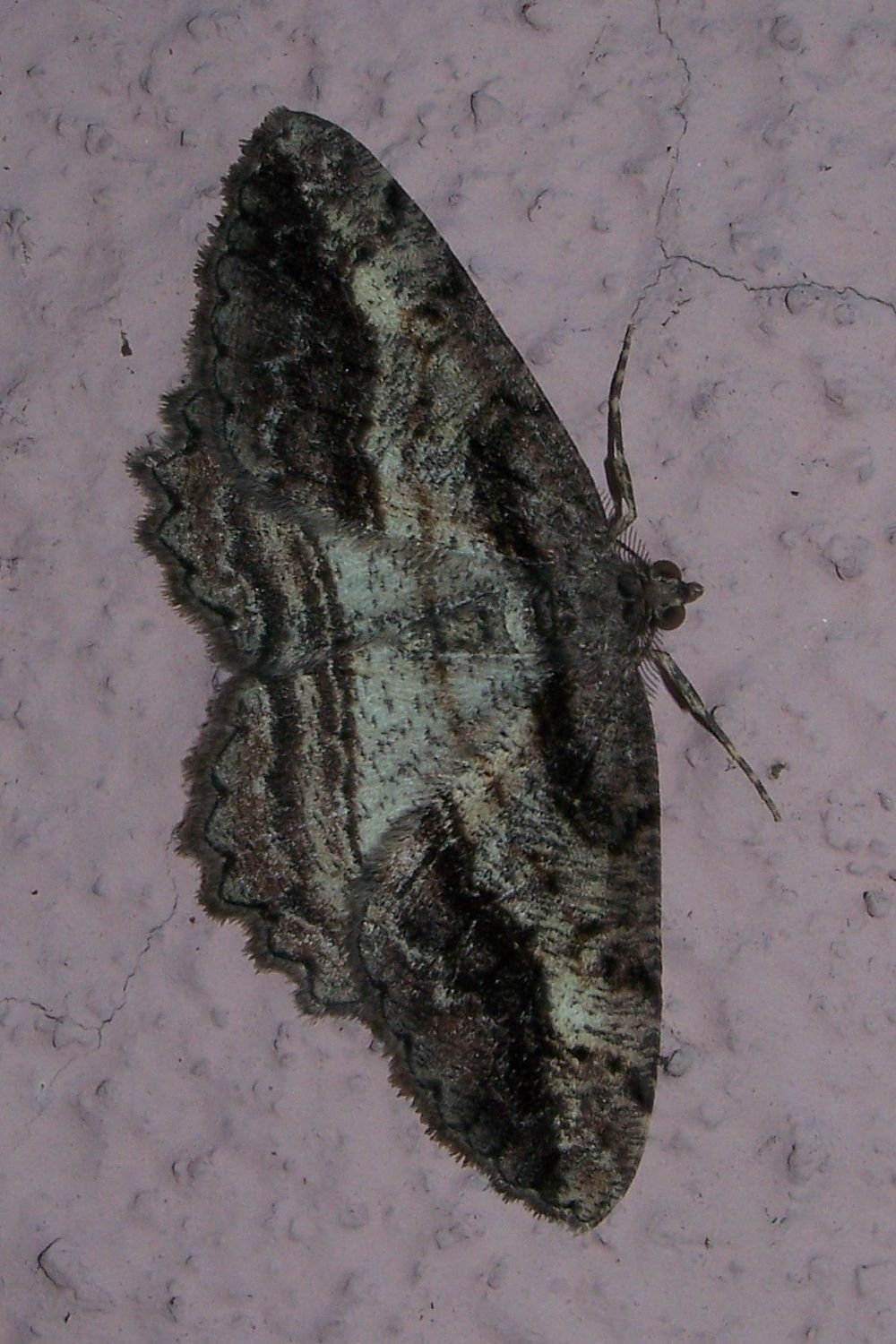
Adult male Neoalcis californiaria, one of the many species only tentatively placed in the Boarmiini

As numerous ennominae genera have not yet been unequivocally assigned to a tribe, the genus list is preliminary.

- Abaciscus
- Acrotomodes
- Adactylotis (tentatively placed here)
- Aethalura
- Afriberina (tentatively placed here)
- Alcis
- Amblychia
- Amraica
- Anacamptodes (tentatively placed here)
- Anacleora
- Anavinemina
- Anavitrinella
- Antiphoides
- Apheloceros
- Apophyga
- Arichanna
- Ascotis
- Astalotesia
- Ateloptila
- Athroolopha (tentatively placed here)
- Biclavigera
- Blepharoctenucha
- Boarmacaria
- Bornealcis
- Bracca
- Bryoptera
- Calamodes (tentatively placed here)
- Calcyopa (tentatively placed here)
- Calicha
- Calichodes
- Callhistia
- Callocasta
- Catoria
- Chesiadodes
- Chorodna
- Chrysoblephara
- Cleora
- Cleorodes
- Colocleora
- Coremecis
- Craspedosis
- Crocota
- Cryptomedasina
- Cusiala
- Dalima
- Darisa
- Dasyboarmia
- Dasyfidonia (tentatively placed here)
- Dasypteroma (tentatively placed here)
- Deileptenia
- Deinotrichia
- Dilophodes
- Diplublephara
- Diplurodes
- Duliophyle
- Dyscheralcis
- Ecleora (tentatively placed here)
- Ectropidia
- Ectropis
- Ekboarmia (tentatively placed here)
- Ematurga
- †Eogeometer Fischer, Michalski & Hausmann, 2019
- Ephalaenia
- Ephemerophila
- Epimecis (tentatively placed here)
- Erebomorpha
- Eubarnesia
- Eulycia
- Eumannia
- Eurranthis (tentatively placed here)
- Eutomopepla
- Exeliopsis
- Exelis (tentatively placed here)
- Fagivorina
- Gasterocome
- Glaucina (tentatively placed here)
- Glena (tentatively placed here)
- Glenoides (tentatively placed here)
- Harutaea
- Harutalcis
- Hesperumia (tentatively placed here)
- Heterarmia
- Heterogena
- Hulstina
- Hymenomima
- Hypomecis (including Boarmia)
- Hyposidra (tentatively placed here)
- Iridopsis (tentatively placed here)
- Ithysia
- Iulotrichia
- Jankowskia
- Krananda
- Lassaba
- Lipogya
- Lophobates
- Megalycinia
- Megametopon
- Melanchroia
- Melanolophia
- Melanoscia
- Menophra
- Microcalicha
- Milionia
- Myrioblephara
- Necyopa
- Neoalcis (tentatively placed here)
- Neofidonia
- Nigriblephara
- Nychiodes
- Odysia
- Ophthalmitis
- Orthofidonia
- Paraboarmia
- Paradarisa
- Parectropis
- Peribatodes
- Perigramma
- Phaselia
- Pherotesia
- Pholodes
- Phthonosema
- Phyllometra
- Physocleora
- Pimaphera (tentatively placed here)
- Pogonopygia
- Polyacme
- Praesos
- Prochasma
- Protoboarmia
- Pseudalcis
- Pseuderannis
- Pseudocoremia (tentatively placed here)
- Psilalcis
- Racotis
- Rikiosatoa
- Ruttellerona
- Satoblephara
- Sciadia (tentatively placed here)
- Scotorythra
- Selidosema
- Spartopteryx
- Stenoporpia (tentatively placed here)
- Synopsia
- Sysstema
- Tephronia
- Thoyowpongia
- Tornos (tentatively placed here)
- Xandrames
- Zanclomenophra
- Zanclopera
- Zermizinga
- Zernyia (tentatively placed here)

In addition, the genera Acrodontis and Xerodes (usually placed in Ennomini), as well as Monocerotesa (usually in Macariini) are placed in the Boarmiini by some authors. "Boarmia" penthearia however appears to belong to the Macariini.

In 2019, the first geometrid caterpillar in Baltic amber was discovered by German scientists. Described under Eogeometer vadens, it measured about 5 mm (0.20 in), and was estimated to be 44 million years old, dating back to Eocene epoch. It was described as the earliest evidence for the subfamily of Ennominae, particularly the tribe of Boarmiini.
