= Igea (disambiguation) =

Igea is a village in Spain.

Igea may also refer to:

- Francisco Igea, Spanish politician
- Interactive Games and Entertainment Association, an Australian video game association

== See also ==
- Egea (disambiguation)
