= Chrysoblephara =

Scientific classification
- Kingdom: Animalia
- Phylum: Arthropoda
- Clade: Pancrustacea
- Class: Insecta
- Order: Lepidoptera
- Family: Geometridae
- Subfamily: Ennominae
- Tribe: Boarmiini
- Genus: Chrysoblephara; Holloway, 1993
- Species: C. chrysoteucta

Binomial name
- Chrysoblephara chrysoteucta (Prout, 1926)

Genus of moths

Chrysoblephara is a monotypic moth genus in the family Geometridae erected by Jeremy Daniel Holloway in 1993. Its only species, Chrysoblephara chrysoteucta, described by Louis Beethoven Prout in 1926, is found in Myanmar and Borneo.
