= Lophobates =

Scientific classification
- Kingdom: Animalia
- Phylum: Arthropoda
- Clade: Pancrustacea
- Class: Insecta
- Order: Lepidoptera
- Family: Geometridae
- Tribe: Boarmiini
- Genus: Lophobates; Warren, 1899

Genus of moths

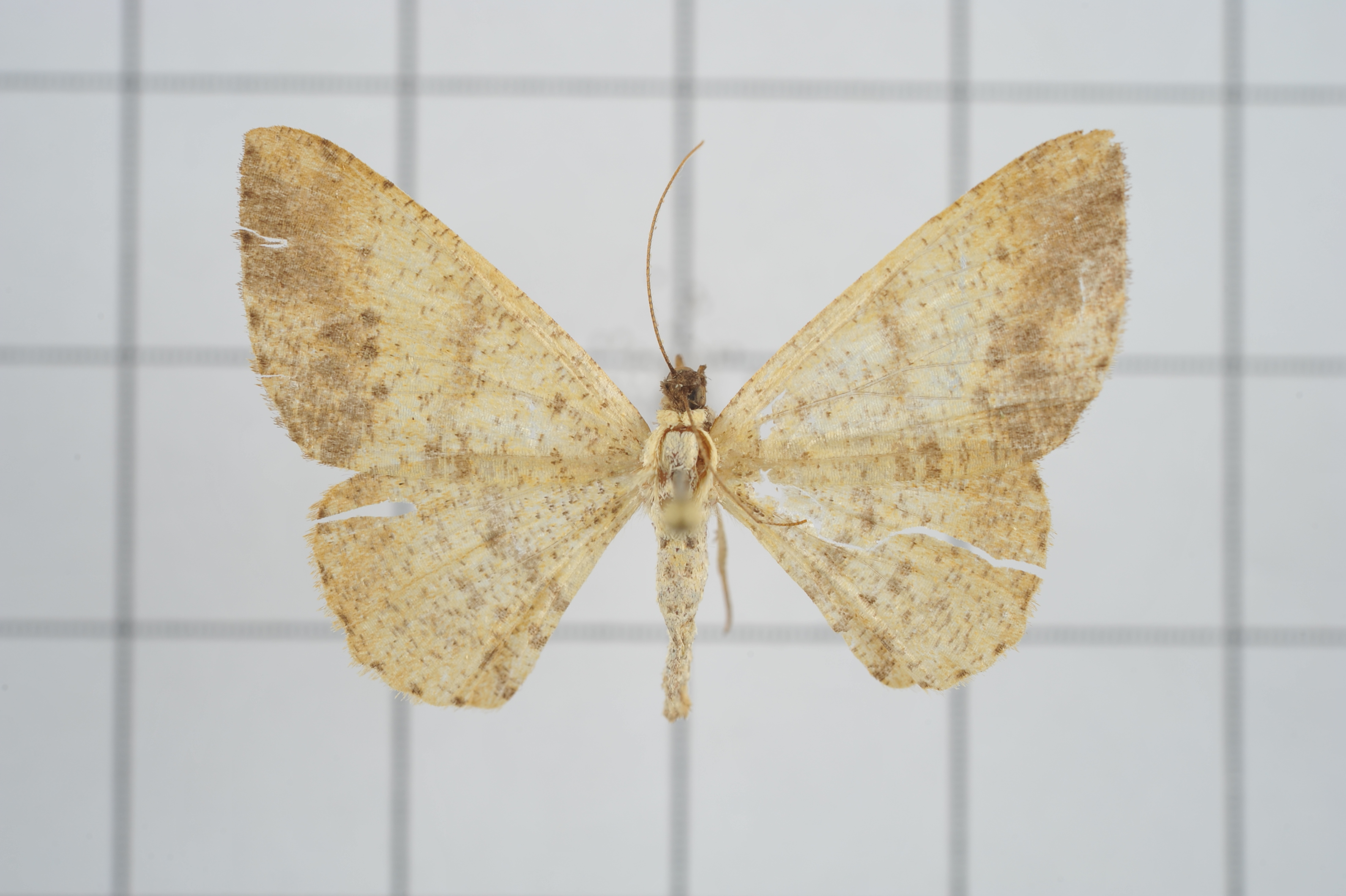
A specimen of Lophobates inchoata from Taiwan

Lophobates is a genus of moths in the family Geometridae described by Warren in 1899.

== Species ==
- Lophobates ochreicostata Warren, 1899 north-eastern Himalayas
- Lophobates mesotoechia (Prout, 1926) Borneo
