= Coremecis =

Scientific classification
- Kingdom: Animalia
- Phylum: Arthropoda
- Clade: Pancrustacea
- Class: Insecta
- Order: Lepidoptera
- Family: Geometridae
- Tribe: Boarmiini
- Genus: Coremecis; Holloway, 1993

Genus of moths

Coremecis is a genus of moths in the family Geometridae.

== Species ==
- Coremecis incursaria (Walker, 1860)
- Coremecis maculata (Warren, 1899)
