= Bornealcis =

Scientific classification
- Kingdom: Animalia
- Phylum: Arthropoda
- Clade: Pancrustacea
- Class: Insecta
- Order: Lepidoptera
- Family: Geometridae
- Subfamily: Ennominae
- Tribe: Boarmiini
- Genus: Bornealcis; Holloway, 1993

Genus of moths

Bornealcis is a genus of moths in the family Geometridae.

== Species ==
- Bornealcis derivata (Prout, 1926)
- Bornealcis expleta (Prout, 1932)
- Bornealcis versicolor (Prout, 1915)
