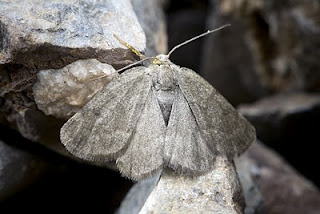
- Sciadia septaria

Scientific classification
- Kingdom: Animalia
- Phylum: Arthropoda
- Clade: Pancrustacea
- Class: Insecta
- Order: Lepidoptera
- Family: Geometridae
- Tribe: Boarmiini
- Genus: Sciadia; Hübner, 1822

Synonyms
- Dasydia Guenée, [1858]; Orphne Hübner, [1825]

= Sciadia =

Genus of moths

Sciadia is a genus of moths in the family Geometridae erected by Jacob Hübner in 1822.

== Selected species ==
- Sciadia dolomitica Huemer & Hausmann, 2009
- Sciadia horridaria (Hübner, 1799)
- Sciadia innuptaria (Herrich-Schäffer, 1852)
- Sciadia septaria (Guenée, 1857)
- Sciadia slovenica Leraut, 2008
- Sciadia tenebraria (Esper, 1806) (=Sciadia torvaria (Hübner, 1813), Sciadia sabaudiensis Leraut, 2008)
  - Sciadia tenebraria wockearia (Staudinger, 1871)
  - Sciadia tenebraria taurusica Huemer & Hausmann, 2009
