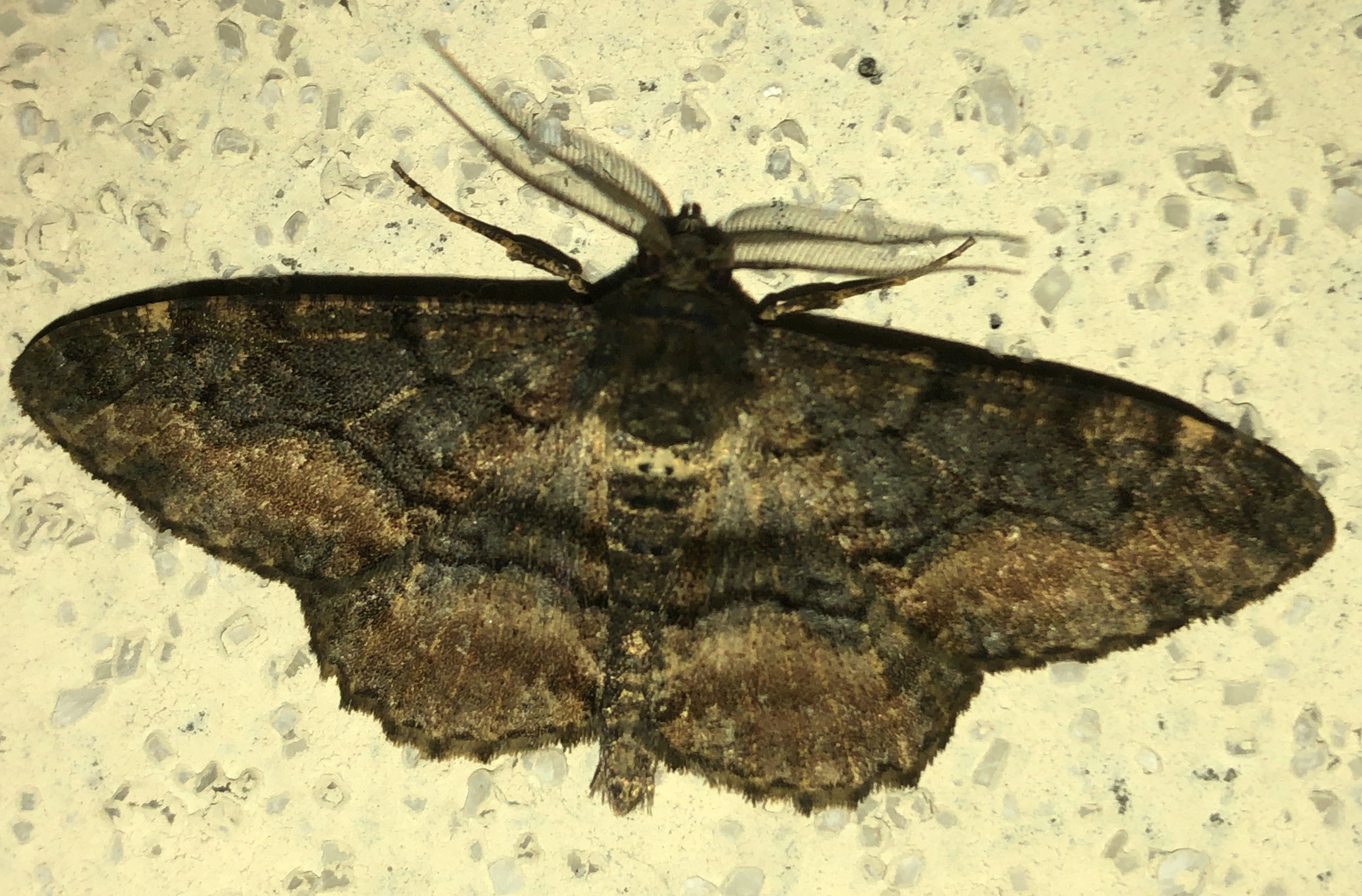
- Jankowskia fuscaria

Scientific classification
- Kingdom: Animalia
- Phylum: Arthropoda
- Clade: Pancrustacea
- Class: Insecta
- Order: Lepidoptera
- Family: Geometridae
- Tribe: Boarmiini
- Genus: Jankowskia; Oberthür, 1884

= Jankowskia =

Genus of moths

Jankowskia is a geometer moth genus in the tribe Boarmiini of subfamily Ennominae. The genus was described by Oberthür in 1884.

It includes the following species:

- Jankowskia acuta N. Jiang, D.Y. Xue & H.X. Han, 2010
- Jankowskia athleta Oberthür, 1884
- Jankowskia fuscaria fuscaria (Leech, 1891)
- Jankowskia pseudathleta Sato, 1980
- Jankowskia bituminaria (Lederer, 1853) (= J. tenebricosa)
- Jankowskia taiwanensis Sato, 1980
- Jankowskia viidaleppi Sato, 1985

The genus is named after Polish naturalist Michał Jankowski.
