= Apophyga =

Scientific classification
- Kingdom: Animalia
- Phylum: Arthropoda
- Class: Insecta
- Order: Lepidoptera
- Family: Geometridae
- Subfamily: Ennominae
- Tribe: Boarmiini
- Genus: Apophyga; Warren, 1893

Genus of geometer moths

Apophyga is a genus of moths in the family Geometridae.

== Species ==
- Apophyga altapona Holloway, 1976
- Apophyga apona (Prout, 1932)
- Apophyga griseiplaga Warren
- Apophyga sericea Warren, 1893
