= Necyopa =

Scientific classification
- Kingdom: Animalia
- Phylum: Arthropoda
- Clade: Pancrustacea
- Class: Insecta
- Order: Lepidoptera
- Family: Geometridae
- Tribe: Boarmiini
- Genus: Necyopa; Walker, 1861

Synonyms
- Polylophodes Warren, 1896

Genus of moths

Necyopa is a genus of moths in the family Geometridae erected by Francis Walker in 1861.

== Species ==
- Necyopa flatipennata Walker, 1862 Borneo, Peninsular Malaysia
- Necyopa ioge Prout, 1932 Borneo
- Necyopa subtriangula Prout, 1932 Borneo
- Necyopa chloana (Prout, 1926) Borneo
- Necyopa triangularis (Warren, 1896) Java
- Necyopa picta (Warren, 1896) Java
