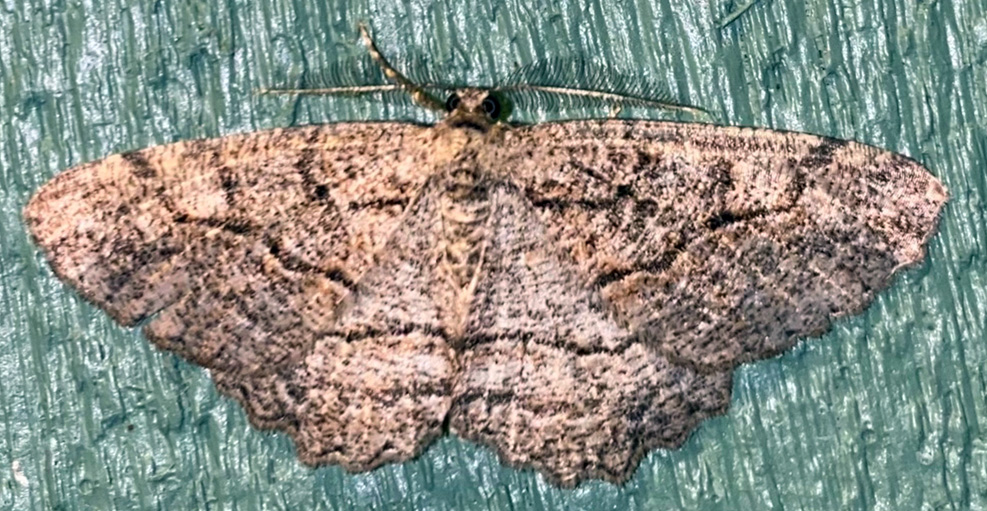

Scientific classification
- Kingdom: Animalia
- Phylum: Arthropoda
- Clade: Pancrustacea
- Class: Insecta
- Order: Lepidoptera
- Family: Geometridae
- Tribe: Boarmiini
- Genus: Neoalcis; McDunnough, 1920
- Species: N. californiaria

Binomial name
- Neoalcis californiaria (Packard, 1871)

Synonyms
- Neoalcis latifasciaria (Packard, 1873); Boarmia californiaria (Packard, 1871)

= Neoalcis =

Genus of moths

Neoalcis californiaria, the Brown-lined looper, is a common North American moth, with a range along the west coast from British Columbia to California. Its larva is a looper (inchworm) caterpillar that feeds on Douglas Fir and other conifers trees. It is identified by the position of three dark lines on each wing and scalloped edges of the hindwing.

Neoalcis is a monotypic genus of moths in the family Geometridae erected by James Halliday McDunnough in 1920. It is the only species in the genus. The species holotype was described by Packard in 1871 under the name Boarmia californiaria.

== Description ==
The wingspan is about 34 mm. The Brown-lined Looper's ground color ranges from ashy gray, to light brown to dark brown, with numerous brown speckles and variable patches of darker shading between crosslines. Wing edges are scalloped.

It has three dark transverse lines on both forewing and hindwing, however the middle line may be obscure. When in a resting posture, with wings spread, the darkest crossline (the PM line) of the hindwing is set lower and dose not line up with the darkest line of the forewing.

On the forewing, the basal line is curved convexly and ends on the costa at the basal third. The middle line is broader towards the costa and may be truncated, faded or missing. The third (Postmedial) line has a gentle wave, one point at the lower submedian venule and the third on the median venule.There are discal spots on the hindwing that can be seen when the forewings are open and from the ventral (underside) view.

Males have wide, two-sided, pectinate (feathery) antennae. Packard notes of the specimens he studied that the female was "paler ash, less ochreous and the hind wing more deeply scalloped." (Note: Note: This general description is based on the original halotype specimen described by Packard. Individual moths may vary by population and subspecies.)

== Range ==
West coast of North America including coastal British Columbia, Washington, Oregon and California. and into Mexico.

== Host plants ==
N. californiaria are "innocuous solitary defoliators", freely feeding on foliage without causing significant damage to healthy trees. Larvae feed mainly on Douglas Fir. Other food sources include Western Hemlock, Western Red Cedar, Grand Fir, and Lodgepole Pine.

== Life cycle ==
The caterpillar is a twig-mimicing looper growing up to 35 mm long. "Head, tan with rust mottling, vertex moderately cleft. Body, elongate, colour highly variable from rusty brown (most common) to light tan to dark grey. Prominent subspiracular tubercles on the second abdominal segment. Raised pairs of dark tubercles on the dorsum near posterior margin of abdominal segments 2-8." (Natural Resources Canada )

Adults are observed from June to November (depending on the climate), peaking in late summer. The first instar is born and begins feeding by the fall. It overwinters as a mid-instar larva and resumes feeding in the spring. Pupation occurs in June or July.

== Similar species ==
- Iridopsis pergracilis
- Parapheromia cassinoi
- Cymatophora approximaria (Giant Gray Moth)
- Pterospoda nigrescens

== Photos ==
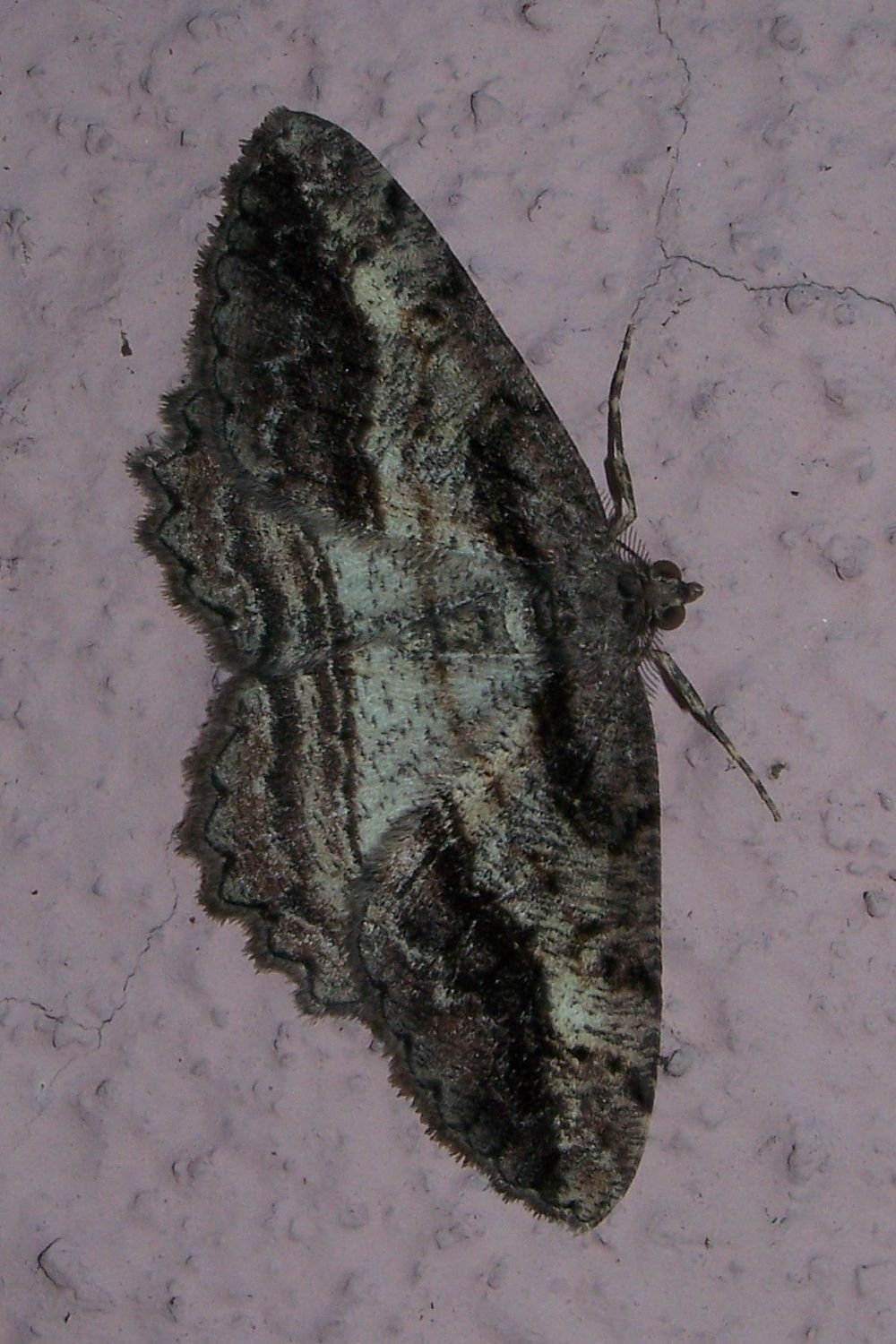
Male Neoalcis californiaria

Color variations in a single population in Oregon.

== External links and images ==
- Moth Photography Group
- Bug Guide
- iNaturalist
