= Paraboarmia =

Scientific classification
- Kingdom: Animalia
- Phylum: Arthropoda
- Class: Insecta
- Order: Lepidoptera
- Family: Geometridae
- Tribe: Boarmiini
- Genus: Paraboarmia; Krampl, 1994
- Species: P. viertlii

Binomial name
- Paraboarmia viertlii (Bohatsch, 1883)

Genus of moths

Paraboarmia is a monotypic moth genus in the family Geometridae erected by F. Krampl in 1994. Its only species, Paraboarmia viertlii, the Bohatsch's lined, first described by Otto Bohatsch in 1883, is found in Europe.
