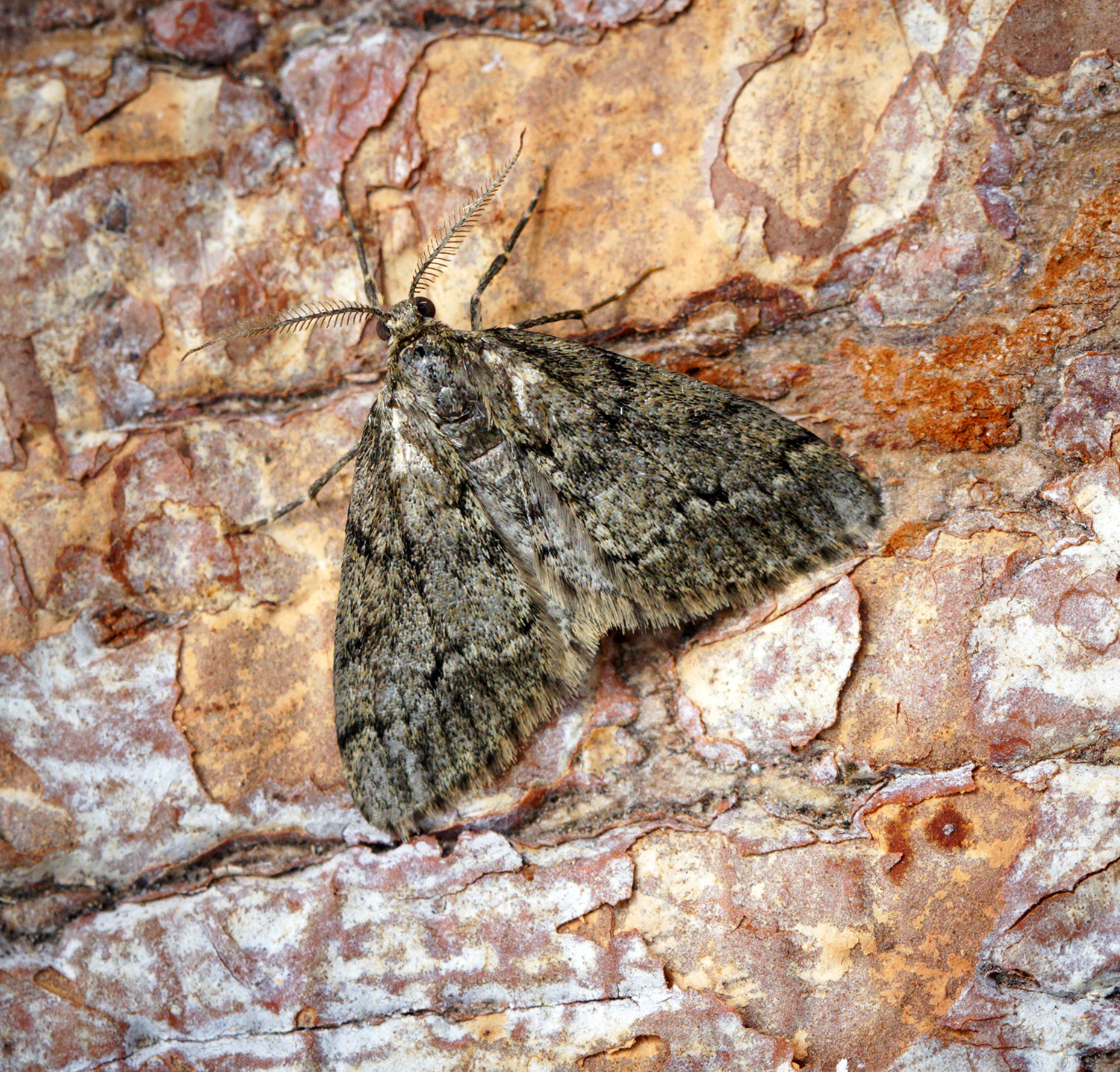
- Tephronia cremiaria

Scientific classification
- Kingdom: Animalia
- Phylum: Arthropoda
- Class: Insecta
- Order: Lepidoptera
- Family: Geometridae
- Tribe: Boarmiini
- Genus: Tephronia; Hübner, 1825

= Tephronia =

Genus of moths

Tephronia is a genus of moths in the family Geometridae, raised the German entomologist Jacob Hübner in 1825.

== Species ==
- Tephronia codetaria
- Tephronia cyrnea
- Tephronia espaniola
- Tephronia gracilaria
- Tephronia oranaria
- Tephronia sepiaria (Hufnagel, 1767) – Dusky Carpet
- Tephronia sicula
