= Boarmacaria =

Scientific classification
- Kingdom: Animalia
- Phylum: Arthropoda
- Clade: Pancrustacea
- Class: Insecta
- Order: Lepidoptera
- Family: Geometridae
- Subfamily: Ennominae
- Tribe: Boarmiini
- Genus: Boarmacaria; Holloway, 1993

Genus of moths

Boarmacaria is a genus of moths in the family Geometridae.

== Species ==
- Boarmacaria herbuloti Holloway, 1993
- Boarmacaria tenuilinea (Warren, 1900)
