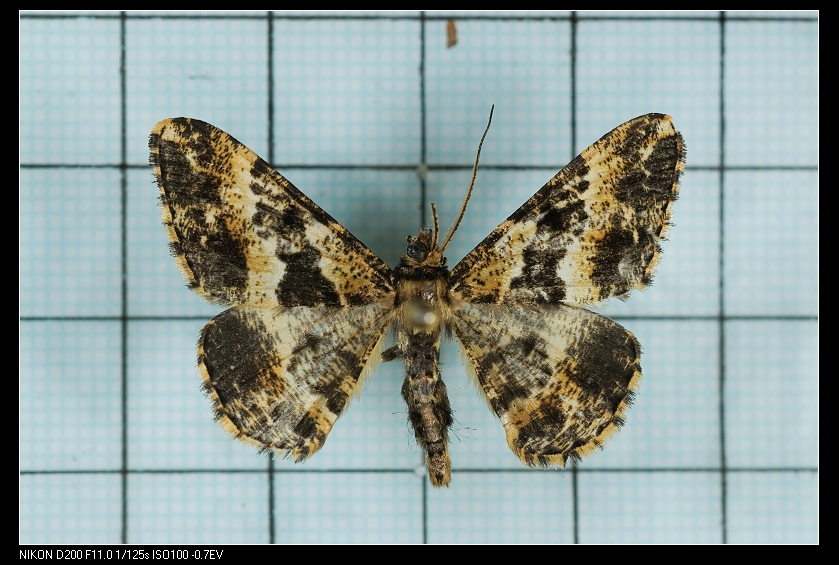

Scientific classification
- Kingdom: Animalia
- Phylum: Arthropoda
- Class: Insecta
- Order: Lepidoptera
- Family: Geometridae
- Genus: Harutaea
- Species: H. flavizona

Binomial name
- Harutaea flavizona Sato, 2000

Synonyms
- Boarmia euryzona Hampson, 1895 (Unnecessary replacement name for latifasciata Warren); Boarmia (Gasterocome) euryzona; Gasterocome latifasciata; Gasterocome euryzona

= Harutaea flavizona =

Species of moth

Harutaea flavizona is a moth of the family Geometridae. It is found in Taiwan, Thailand and Indonesia.
