= Sysstema =

Scientific classification
- Kingdom: Animalia
- Phylum: Arthropoda
- Class: Insecta
- Order: Lepidoptera
- Family: Geometridae
- Tribe: Boarmiini
- Genus: Sysstema; Warren, 1899

Genus of moths

Sysstema is a genus of moths in the family Geometridae described by Warren in 1899.

== Species ==
- Sysstema semicirculata (Moore, [1868]) north-eastern Himalayas, Myanmar
- Sysstema pauxilla Prout Myanmar
- Sysstema paxilloides Holloway, 1993 Borneo, Sumatra
