= Egea =

Egea or EGEA may refer to:

== Biology ==
- Egea (squid), a genus of glass squid
- Egea, a synonym of the moth genus Phyllometra

== Other ==
- European Geography Association, a European network of geography students and young geographers
- Expert Group on Emergency Access, an expert group assisting in 112 emergency number access
- Fiat Egea, a vehicle produced by Fiat for the Turkish market
- Teodoro García Egea, Spanish politician

== See also ==
- Ejea
