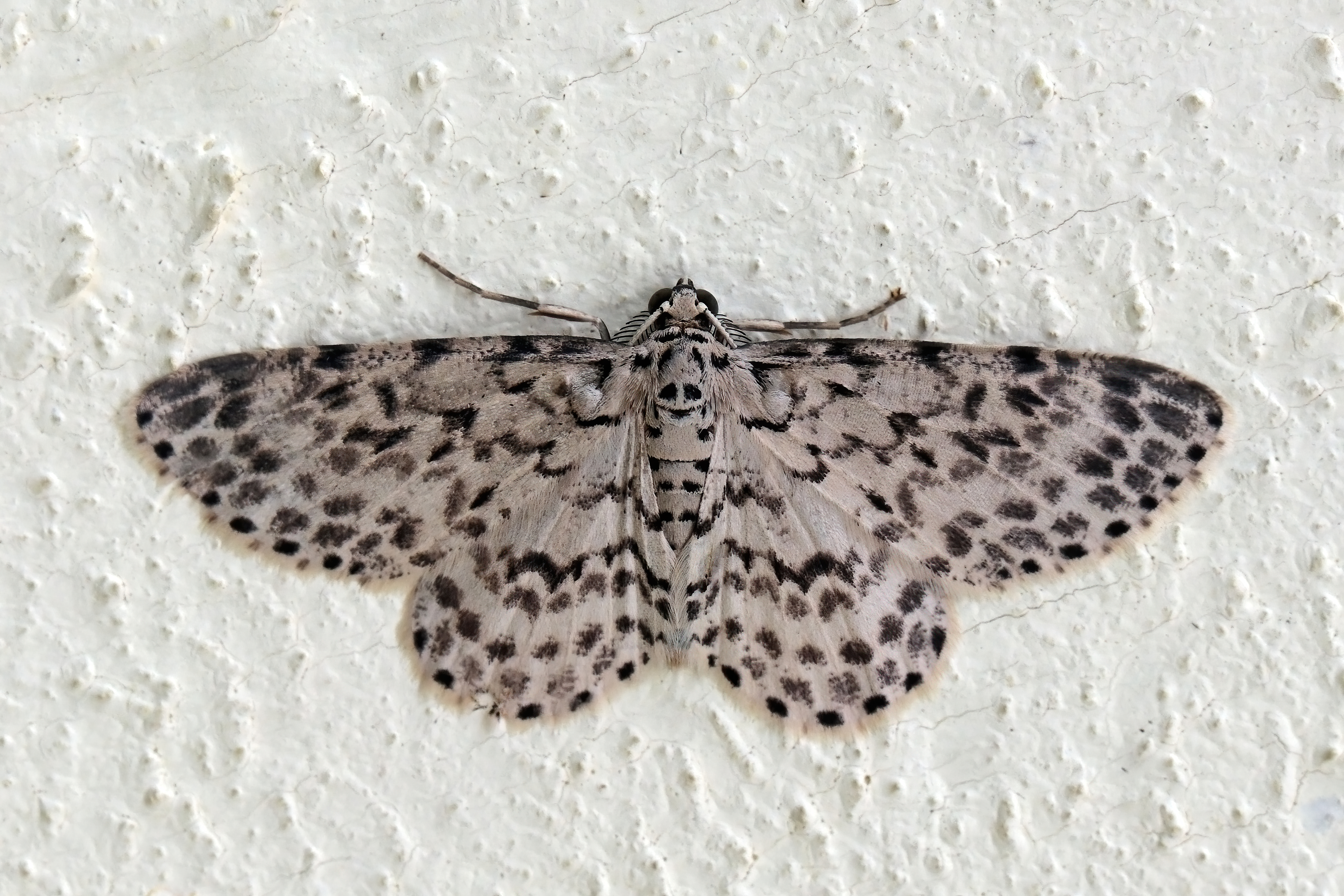
- Hymenomima camerata, Panama

Scientific classification
- Kingdom: Animalia
- Phylum: Arthropoda
- Class: Insecta
- Order: Lepidoptera
- Family: Geometridae
- Tribe: Boarmiini
- Genus: Hymenomima; Warren, 1895

= Hymenomima =

Genus of moths

Hymenomima is a genus of moths in the family Geometridae described by Warren in 1895.

== Species ==
- Hymenomima amberia Schaus, 1901
- Hymenomima arthura Schaus, 1901
- Hymenomima camerata Warren, 1900
- Hymenomima canidentata Dognin, 1902
- Hymenomima carneata Warren, 1904
- Hymenomima cindica Warren, 1897
- Hymenomima cogigaria Möschler, 1882
- Hymenomima conia Prout, 1931
- Hymenomima costilla Dognin, 1895
- Hymenomima dogninana Dyar, 1916
- Hymenomima extersaria Warren, 1897
- Hymenomima franckia Schaus, 1897
- Hymenomima macaria Schaus, 1901
- Hymenomima mediorasa Dognin, 1909
- Hymenomima memor Warren, 1906
- Hymenomima minuta Warren, 1897
- Hymenomima nephalia Druce, 1892
- Hymenomima nivacaria E. D. Jones, 1921
- Hymenomima nortonia Schaus, 1898
- Hymenomima occulta Schaus, 1901
- Hymenomima perfuscimargo Prout, 1910
- Hymenomima pristes Prout, 1933
- Hymenomima rufata Warren, 1904
- Hymenomima semialba Warren, 1897
- Hymenomima seriata Prout, 1933
- Hymenomima subnigrata Warren, 1906
- Hymenomima tharpoides Dognin, 1914
- Hymenomima umbelularia Hübner, [1825]
