= Calichodes =

Scientific classification
- Domain: Eukaryota
- Kingdom: Animalia
- Phylum: Arthropoda
- Class: Insecta
- Order: Lepidoptera
- Family: Geometridae
- Subfamily: Ennominae
- Tribe: Boarmiini
- Genus: Calichodes; Warren, 1897

Species
- See text

Genus of moths

Calichodes is a genus of moths in the family Geometridae.

== Species ==
- Calichodes difoveata (Wehrli, 1943)
- Calichodes subrugata (Walker, 1862)
