= Zanclomenophra =

Scientific classification
- Kingdom: Animalia
- Phylum: Arthropoda
- Clade: Pancrustacea
- Class: Insecta
- Order: Lepidoptera
- Family: Geometridae
- Tribe: Boarmiini
- Genus: Zanclomenophra; Holloway, 1993
- Species: Z. subusta

Binomial name
- Zanclomenophra subusta (Warren, 1901)

Genus of moths

Zanclomenophra is a monotypic moth genus in the family Geometridae erected by Jeremy Daniel Holloway in 1993. Its only species, Zanclomenophra subusta, described by Warren in 1901, is found in Thailand, Peninsular Malaysia, Sumatra, Nias, Borneo and Sulawesi.
