= Pherotesia =

Scientific classification
- Kingdom: Animalia
- Phylum: Arthropoda
- Class: Insecta
- Order: Lepidoptera
- Family: Geometridae
- Tribe: Boarmiini
- Genus: Pherotesia; Schaus, 1901

Genus of moths

Pherotesia is a genus of moths in the family Geometridae. The genus was described by William Schaus in 1901.

== Species ==
- Pherotesia alterata Warren, 1905
- Pherotesia bifurca Rindge, 1964
- Pherotesia caeca Rindge, 1964
- Pherotesia coiffaiti Herbulot, 1990
- Pherotesia condensaria Guenée, [1858]
- Pherotesia confusata Walker, 1862
- Pherotesia cristata Herbulot, 1976
- Pherotesia dystactos Rindge, 1990
- Pherotesia falcis Rindge, 1964
- Pherotesia flavicincta Warren, 1905
- Pherotesia funebris Schaus, 1912
- Pherotesia garka Rindge, 1990
- Pherotesia gaviota Dognin, 1895
- Pherotesia hamata Rindge, 1964
- Pherotesia inhamata Rindge, 1990
- Pherotesia liciata Dognin, 1911
- Pherotesia lima Rindge, 1964
- Pherotesia lunata Rindge, 1964
- Pherotesia maculiplaga Dognin, 1916
- Pherotesia malinaria Schaus, 1901
- Pherotesia minuisca Rindge, 1964
- Pherotesia obunca Rindge, 1990
- Pherotesia pedaria Rindge, 1990
- Pherotesia potens Warren, 1905
- Pherotesia quadra Rindge, 1990
- Pherotesia ralla Rindge, 1990
- Pherotesia simulatrix Rindge, 1964
- Pherotesia subjecta Warren, 1905
- Pherotesia subsimilis Dognin, 1912
- Pherotesia suffumosa Dognin, 1911
- Pherotesia supplanaria Dyar, 1913
- Pherotesia ultrasimilis Rindge, 1964
