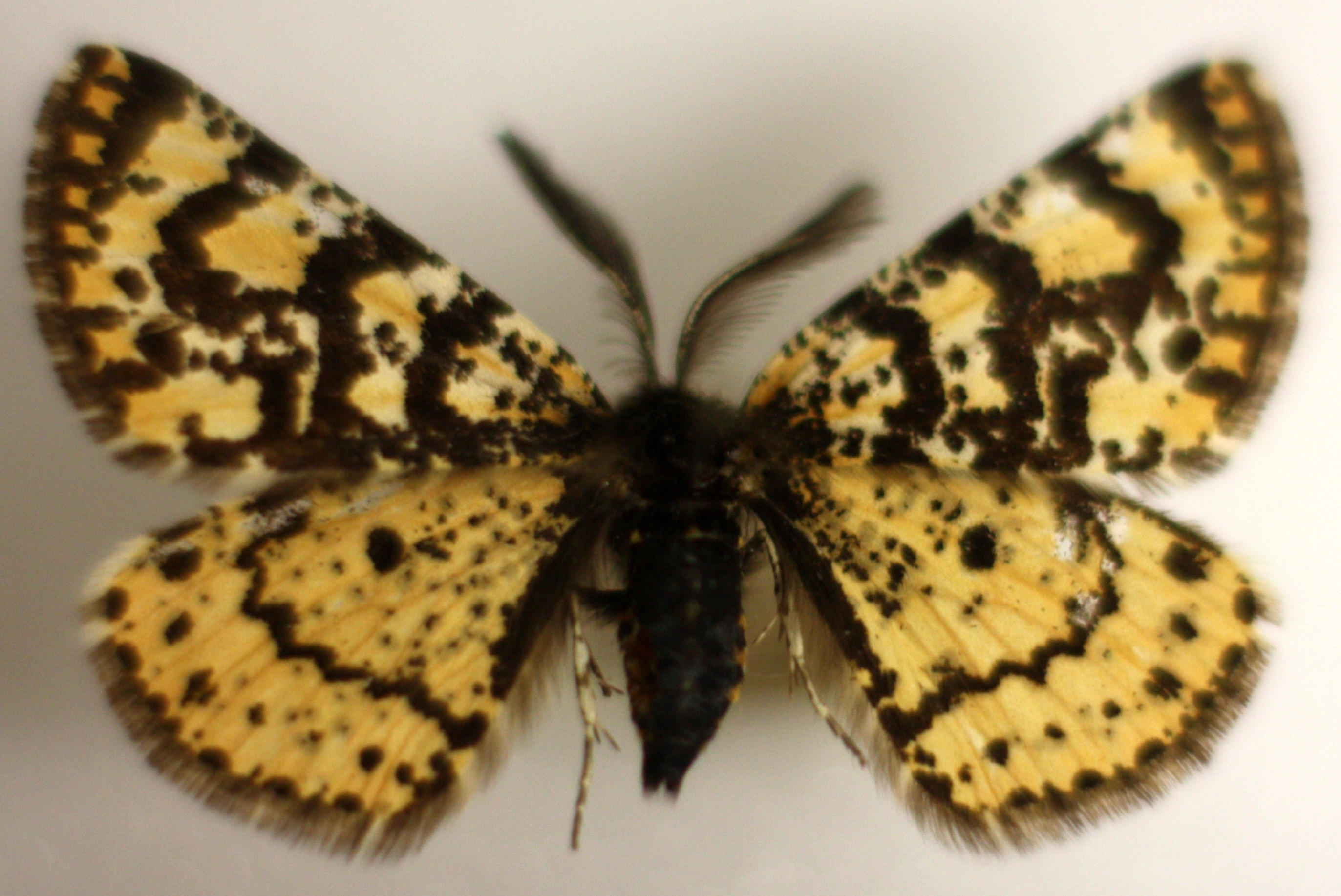
- Eurranthis plummistaria
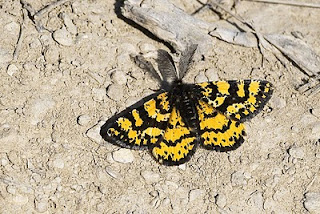

Scientific classification
- Domain: Eukaryota
- Kingdom: Animalia
- Phylum: Arthropoda
- Class: Insecta
- Order: Lepidoptera
- Family: Geometridae
- Tribe: Boarmiini
- Genus: Eurranthis; Hübner, 1823
- Species: E. plummistaria

Binomial name
- Eurranthis plummistaria (Devillers, 1789)

Synonyms
- Phalaena plummistaria Villers, 1789; Fidonia acronevadaria Wehrli, 1926

= Eurranthis =

Species of moth

Eurranthis is a monotypic moth genus in the family Geometridae erected by Jacob Hübner in 1823. Its only species, Eurranthis plummistaria, was first described by Charles Joseph Devillers in 1789. It is found in south-western Europe, including the Maritime Alps in France and Italy and the Iberian Peninsula.

The wingspan is 30–32 mm. It is a day-flying species.

Larvae feed on Dorycnium species.

== Subspecies ==
- Eurranthis plummistaria plummistaria
- Eurranthis plummistaria atlanticaria Le Cerf, 1923 (North Africa)
