= Spartopteryx =

Scientific classification
- Kingdom: Animalia
- Phylum: Arthropoda
- Class: Insecta
- Order: Lepidoptera
- Family: Geometridae
- Tribe: Boarmiini
- Genus: Spartopteryx; Guenée, [1858]
- Species: S. kindermannaria

Binomial name
- Spartopteryx kindermannaria Staudinger, 1871

Synonyms
- Spartopteryx fuscaria Fernández, 1932; Spartopteryx serrularia Lederer, 1855; Spartopteryx tibetica Wehrli

Genus of moths

Spartopteryx is a monotypic moth genus in the family Geometridae erected by Achille Guenée in 1858. Its only species, Spartopteryx kindermannaria, was first described by Otto Staudinger in 1871.
