= Ectropidia =

Scientific classification
- Kingdom: Animalia
- Phylum: Arthropoda
- Class: Insecta
- Order: Lepidoptera
- Family: Geometridae
- Tribe: Boarmiini
- Genus: Ectropidia; Warren, 1895

Genus of moths

Ectropidia is a genus of moths in the family Geometridae.

== Species ==
- Ectropidia altiprimata Holloway, 1993
- Ectropidia coremaria Hampson
- Ectropidia exprimata (Walker, 1861)
- Ectropidia fimbripedata Warren, 1900
- Ectropidia harmani Holloway, 1993
- Ectropidia illepidaria (Walker, 1861)
- Ectropidia quasilepidaria Holloway, 1993
- Ectropidia semijubata (Prout, 1929)
- Ectropidia shoreae (Prout)
