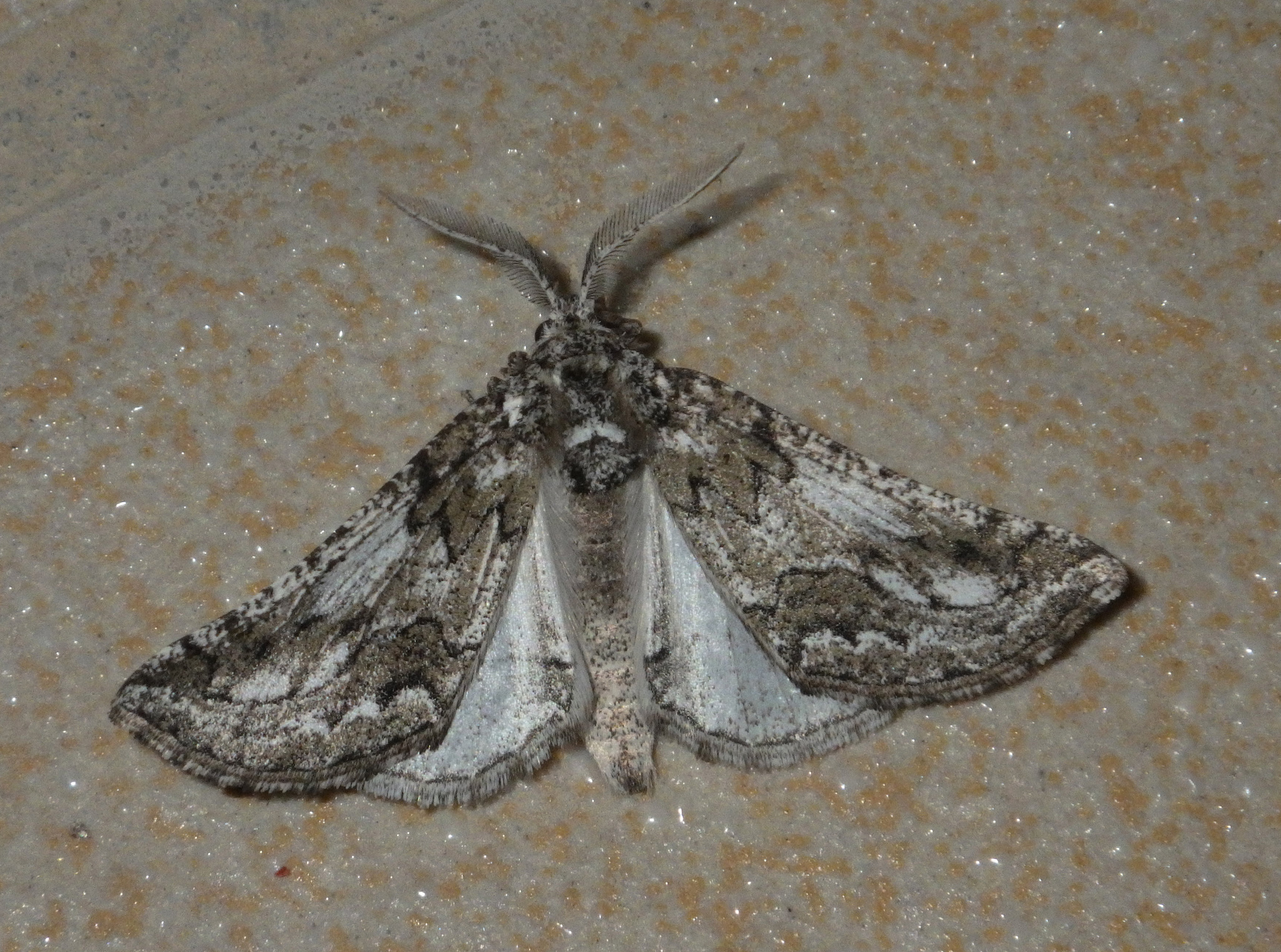
- Phaselia narynaria

Scientific classification
- Kingdom: Animalia
- Phylum: Arthropoda
- Class: Insecta
- Order: Lepidoptera
- Family: Geometridae
- Tribe: Boarmiini
- Genus: Phaselia; Guenée, 1857

= Phaselia =

Genus of moths

Phaselia is a genus of moths in the family Geometridae erected by Achille Guenée in 1857.

== Species ==
- Phaselia serrularia (Eversmann, 1847)
- Phaselia narynaria (Oberthür, 1913)
- Phaselia erika Ebert, 1965
- Phaselia kasyi Wiltshire, 1966
- Phaselia algiricaria (Oberthür, 1913)
