= Darisa =

Scientific classification
- Kingdom: Animalia
- Phylum: Arthropoda
- Clade: Pancrustacea
- Class: Insecta
- Order: Lepidoptera
- Family: Geometridae
- Tribe: Boarmiini
- Genus: Darisa; Moore, 1888

Genus of moths

Darisa is a genus of moths in the family Geometridae described by Frederic Moore in 1888.

== Species ==
- Darisa mucidaria (Walker, 1866) northern India, Thailand
- Darisa maxima Moore, 1888 Thailand
- Darisa parallela (Prout, 1927) Myanmar, Thailand
- Darisa peracuta Sato, 1995 Thailand
- Darisa missionaria (Wehrli, 1941) Thailand
- Darisa firmilinea (Prout, 1926) Assam, Nepal
- Darisa lampasaria (Hampson, 1895) Thailand
