= Thoyowpongia =

Scientific classification
- Kingdom: Animalia
- Phylum: Arthropoda
- Clade: Pancrustacea
- Class: Insecta
- Order: Lepidoptera
- Family: Geometridae
- Tribe: Boarmiini
- Genus: Thoyowpongia; Holloway, 1993
- Species: T. nigrodiscus

Binomial name
- Thoyowpongia nigrodiscus Holloway, 1993

Genus of moths

Thoyowpongia is a monotypic moth genus in the family Geometridae. Its single species, Thoyowpongia nigrodiscus, is found in Borneo, Sumatra and Peninsular Malaysia. Both the genus and species were first described by Jeremy Daniel Holloway in 1993.
