= Ephemerophila =

Scientific classification
- Kingdom: Animalia
- Phylum: Arthropoda
- Class: Insecta
- Order: Lepidoptera
- Family: Geometridae
- Tribe: Boarmiini
- Genus: Ephemerophila; Warren, 1894

Genus of moths

Ephemerophila is a genus of moths in the family Geometridae.

== Species ==
- Ephemerophila decorata (Moore, [1868])
- Ephemerophila humeraria (Moore, [1868])
- Ephemerophila subterminalis (Prout, 1925)
