= Neofidonia =

Scientific classification
- Kingdom: Animalia
- Phylum: Arthropoda
- Class: Insecta
- Order: Lepidoptera
- Family: Geometridae
- Tribe: Boarmiini
- Genus: Neofidonia; Warren, 1904

Genus of moths

Neofidonia is a genus of moths in the family Geometridae described by Warren in 1904.

== Species ==
- Neofidonia nigristigma Warren, 1904
- Neofidonia signata Dognin, 1909
