= Cryptomedasina =

Scientific classification
- Kingdom: Animalia
- Phylum: Arthropoda
- Class: Insecta
- Order: Lepidoptera
- Family: Geometridae
- Tribe: Boarmiini
- Genus: Cryptomedasina; Sato, 1995

Genus of moths

Cryptomedasina is a genus of moths in the family Geometridae described by Sato in 1995.

== Species ==
- Cryptomedasina nagaii Sato, 1995
- Cryptomedasina vandenberghi Prout, 1928
