= Bryoptera =

Scientific classification
- Kingdom: Animalia
- Phylum: Arthropoda
- Class: Insecta
- Order: Lepidoptera
- Family: Geometridae
- Tribe: Boarmiini
- Genus: Bryoptera; Guenée, [1858]

Genus of moths

Bryoptera is a genus of moths in the family Geometridae erected by Achille Guenée in 1858.
