= Afriberina =

Scientific classification
- Kingdom: Animalia
- Phylum: Arthropoda
- Class: Insecta
- Order: Lepidoptera
- Family: Geometridae
- Tribe: Boarmiini
- Genus: Afriberina; Wehrli, 1943

Genus of geometer moths

Afriberina is a genus of moths in the family Geometridae.

== Species ==
- Afriberina tenietaria (Staudinger, 1900)
- Afriberina terraria (A. Bang-Haas, 1907)
