= Ithysia =

Scientific classification
- Kingdom: Animalia
- Phylum: Arthropoda
- Clade: Pancrustacea
- Class: Insecta
- Order: Lepidoptera
- Family: Geometridae
- Tribe: Boarmiini
- Genus: Ithysia; Hübner, [1825]
- Species: I. pravata

Binomial name
- Ithysia pravata Hübner, [1813]

Synonyms
- Ithysia pravaria Hübner, [1825]

Genus of moths

Ithysia is a monotypic moth genus in the family Geometridae. Its only species is Ithysia pravata. The genus was erected by Jacob Hübner in 1825, but the species had been first described by Hübner in 1813.
