= Duliophyle =

Scientific classification
- Kingdom: Animalia
- Phylum: Arthropoda
- Class: Insecta
- Order: Lepidoptera
- Family: Geometridae
- Tribe: Boarmiini
- Genus: Duliophyle; Warren, 1894
- Species: D. agitata

Binomial name
- Duliophyle agitata (Butler, 1878)

Genus of moths

Duliophyle is a monotypic moth genus in the family Geometridae described by Warren in 1894. Its only species, Duliophyle agitata, described by Arthur Gardiner Butler in 1878, is found in Japan.

== Subspecies ==
- Duliophyle agitata ssp. angustaria Leech, 1897
