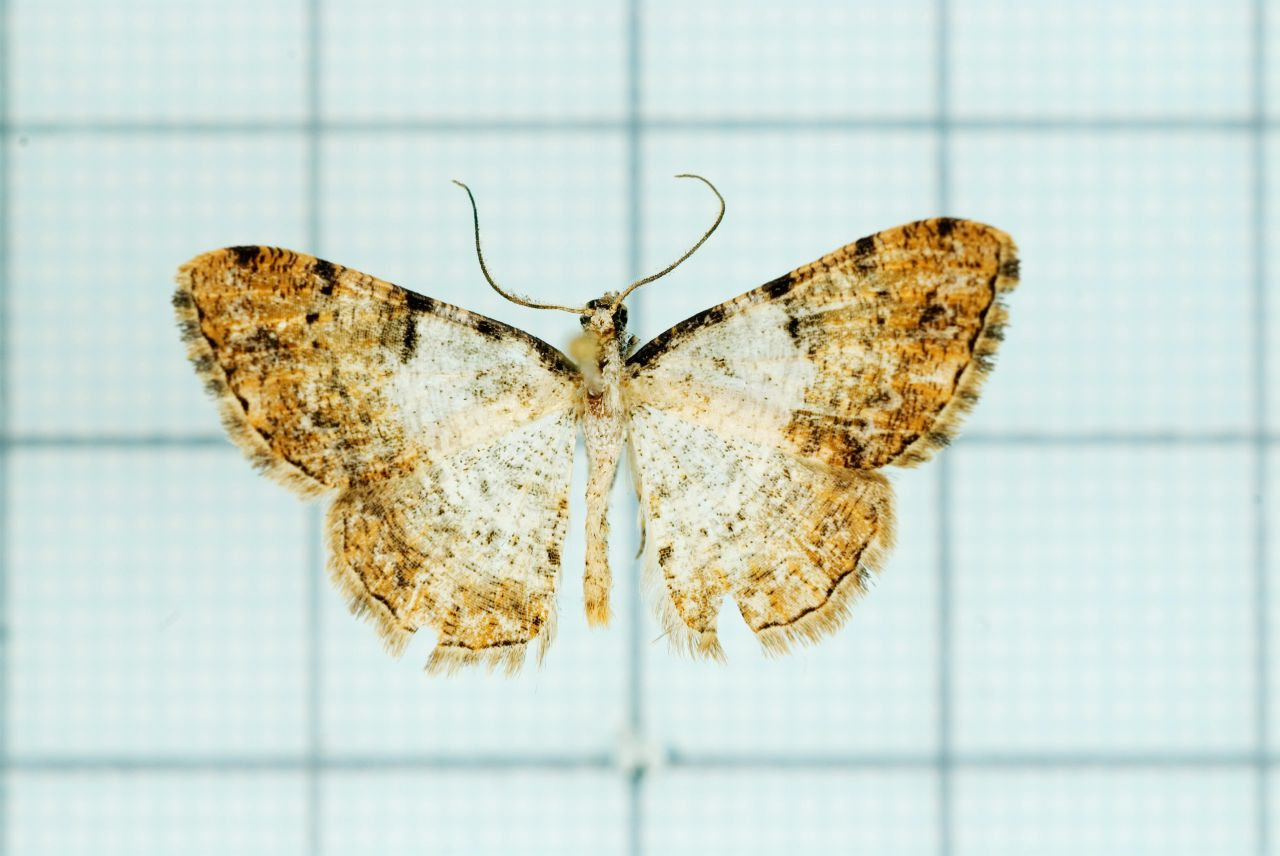
- Myrioblephara albibasis

Scientific classification
- Kingdom: Animalia
- Phylum: Arthropoda
- Class: Insecta
- Order: Lepidoptera
- Family: Geometridae
- Tribe: Boarmiini
- Genus: Myrioblephara; Warren, 1893

= Myrioblephara =

Genus of moths

Myrioblephara is a genus of moths in the family Geometridae first described by Warren in 1893.

== Species ==
- Myrioblephara flexilinea Warren New Guinea
- Myrioblephara mollis Warren New Guinea
- Myrioblephara muscosa Warren New Guinea
- Myrioblephara subtrita Warren New Guinea
- Myrioblephara simplaria (Swinhoe, 1894) north-eastern Himalayas, Sundaland, Philippines, Sulawesi, southern Moluccas, New Guinea
- Myrioblephara bifida Holloway, 1993 Borneo
- Myrioblephara pallibasis Holloway, 1993 Borneo, Peninsular Malaysia, Sumatra
- Myrioblephara geniculata (Prout, 1932) Borneo
- Myrioblephara pingasoides Warren
- Myrioblephara rubrifusa Warren, 1893 Sikkim
