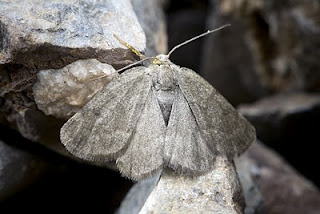

Scientific classification
- Kingdom: Animalia
- Phylum: Arthropoda
- Class: Insecta
- Order: Lepidoptera
- Family: Geometridae
- Genus: Sciadia
- Species: S. septaria

Binomial name
- Sciadia septaria (Guenee, 1858)

Synonyms
- Dasydia septaria Guenee, 1858

= Sciadia septaria =

Species of moth

Sciadia septaria, the sombre bistre, is a species of moth in the family Geometridae. The species was first described by Achille Guenée in 1858. It is found in the Pyrénées.

The wingspan is 26–30 mm. Adults are on wing in July and August.
