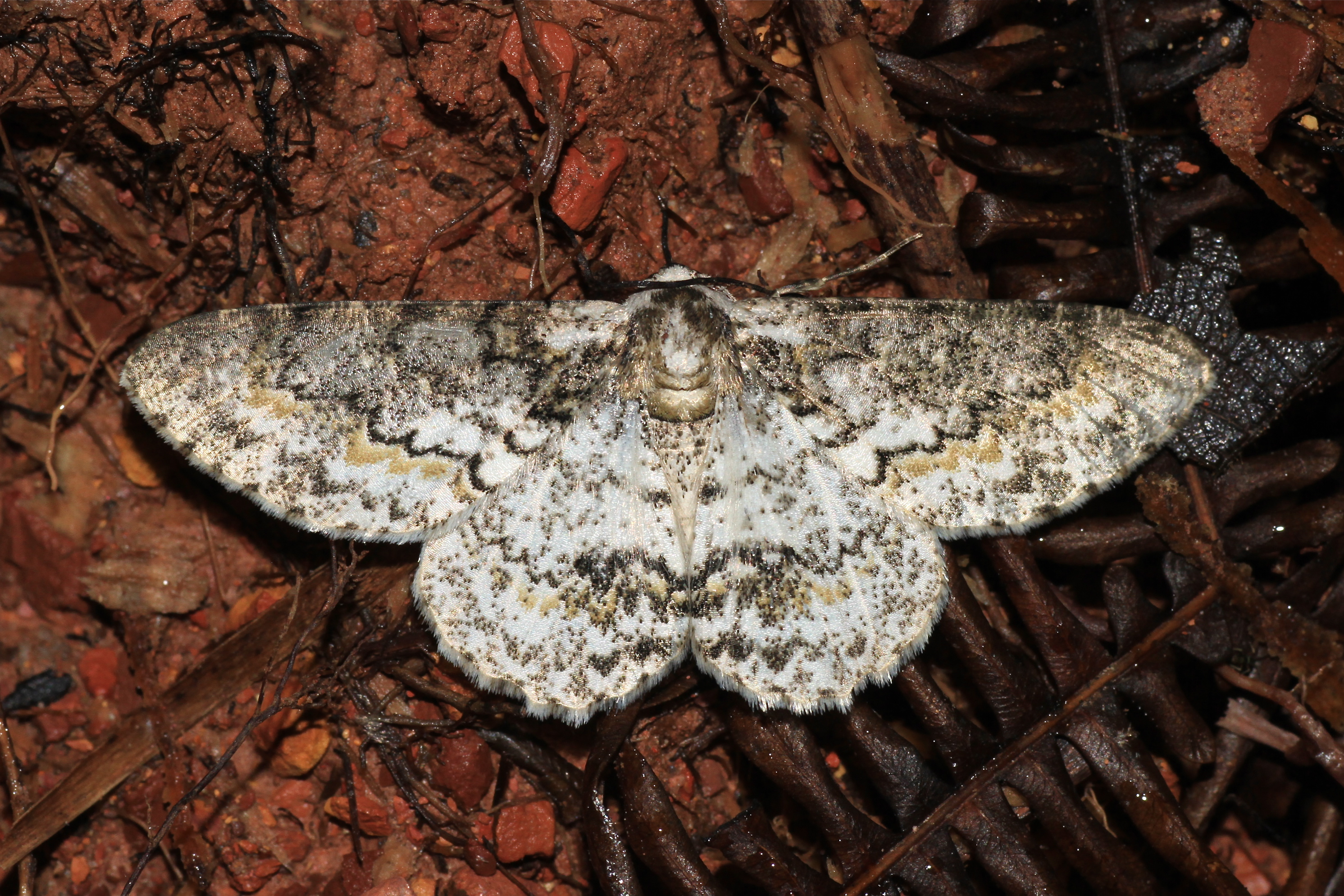
- Iulotrichia decursaria from Borneo

Scientific classification
- Kingdom: Animalia
- Phylum: Arthropoda
- Class: Insecta
- Order: Lepidoptera
- Family: Geometridae
- Tribe: Boarmiini
- Genus: Iulotrichia; Warren, 1894

Type species
- Iulotrichia buzurata Warren, 1894

= Iulotrichia =

Genus of moths

Iulotrichia is a genus of moths in the family Geometridae first described by Warren in 1894.

== Species ==
- Iulotrichia buzurata Warren, 1894
- Iulotrichia decursaria Walker, 1860
- Iulotrichia eusciasta Prout
- Iulotrichia malescripta Warren, 1897
- Iulotrichia semialbida Warren, 1896
- Iulotrichia semiumbrata Warren, 1896
