= Praesos =

Scientific classification
- Kingdom: Animalia
- Phylum: Arthropoda
- Clade: Pancrustacea
- Class: Insecta
- Order: Lepidoptera
- Family: Geometridae
- Tribe: Boarmiini
- Genus: Praesos; Walker, 1854

Genus of moths

Praesos is a genus of moths in the family Geometridae erected by Francis Walker in 1854.

== Species ==
- Praesos mariana (White, 1852) Australia
- Praesos dysphanioides (Rothschild, 1896) Fergusson Island in Papua New Guinea
- Praesos angelus (Rothschild, 1898) Cenderawasih Bay in New Guinea
