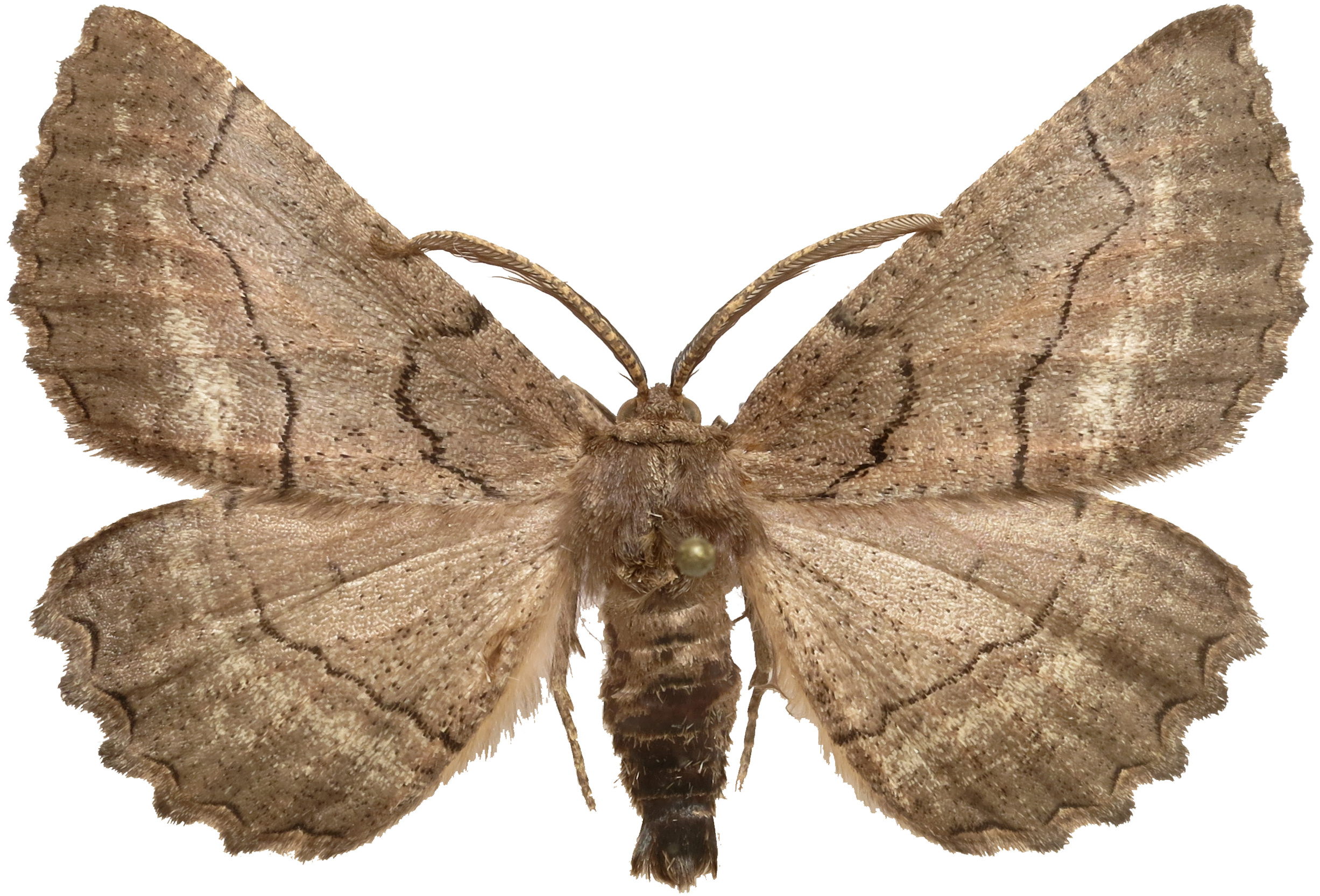
- Nychiodes obscuraria - Drôme, France

Scientific classification
- Kingdom: Animalia
- Phylum: Arthropoda
- Clade: Pancrustacea
- Class: Insecta
- Order: Lepidoptera
- Family: Geometridae
- Tribe: Boarmiini
- Genus: Nychiodes; Lederer, 1853

= Nychiodes =

Genus of moths

Nychiodes is a palearctic genus of moths in the family Geometridae described by Julius Lederer in 1853. As of 2022, the genus comprises 27 species with a geographical distribution across Europe, northern Africa and parts of West, Central and South Asia. they are mostly seen in june and july.

Species are typically large, with beige, grey or brown wings, and have slightly darkened wing tips, medium-sized discal spots on fore- and hindwings, and post- and antemedial lines on the forewings. Genital examination is generally necessary to determine exact species as a result of significant morphological variability.

== Species ==
- Nychiodes amygdalaria (Herrich-Schäffer, 1848)
- Nychiodes andalusiaria Staudinger, 1892 south-western Europe
- Nychiodes antiquarius Staudinger, 1892
- Nychiodes dalmatina Wagner, 1909 south-eastern Europe
- Nychiodes divergaria Staudinger, 1892
- Nychiodes hispanica Wehrli, 1929 Spain
- Nychiodes obscuraria (Villers, 1789) southern Europe
- Nychiodes ragusaria Millière, 1884 southern Europe
- Nychiodes rayatica Wiltshire, 1957
- Nychiodes torrevinagrensis Expósitio, 1984 Spain
- Nychiodes tyttha Prout, 1915 Eritrea
- Nychiodes waltheri Wagner, 1919 south-eastern Europe
