= Physocleora =

Scientific classification
- Kingdom: Animalia
- Phylum: Arthropoda
- Class: Insecta
- Order: Lepidoptera
- Family: Geometridae
- Tribe: Boarmiini
- Genus: Physocleora; Warren, 1897

Genus of moths

Physocleora is a genus of moths in the family Geometridae described by Warren in 1897.

== Species ==
- Physocleora minuta Druce, 1898
- Physocleora albibrunnea Warren, 1906
- Physocleora albiplaga Warren, 1907
- Physocleora bella Warren, 1907
- Physocleora bicolor Warren, 1907
- Physocleora conspersa Warren, 1907
- Physocleora cretaria Warren, 1906
- Physocleora dardusa Schaus, 1901
- Physocleora enana Dognin, 1895
- Physocleora ferruginata Warren, 1907
- Physocleora flaviplaga Warren, 1907
- Physocleora flexilinea Warren, 1907
- Physocleora fulgurata Warren, 1906
- Physocleora fuscicosta Warren, 1906
- Physocleora grisescens Warren, 1907
- Physocleora inangulata Dognin, 1916
- Physocleora marcia Schaus, 1927
- Physocleora nigrescens Prout, 1910
- Physocleora nivea Dognin, 1900
- Physocleora nubilata Warren, 1906
- Physocleora obscura Schaus, 1898
- Physocleora pauper Warren, 1897
- Physocleora pulverata Warren, 1907
- Physocleora punctilla Schaus, 1898
- Physocleora pygmaeata Warren, 1907
- Physocleora rectivecta Warren, 1906
- Physocleora santosia Schaus, 1927
- Physocleora scutigera Warren, 1906
- Physocleora semirufa Dognin, 1912
- Physocleora strigatimargo Dognin, 1916
- Physocleora subochrea Warren, 1902
- Physocleora suffusca Warren, 1906
- Physocleora taeniata Warren, 1907
- Physocleora tascaria Schaus, 1898
- Physocleora tiburtia Stoll, 1781
- Physocleora venirufata Warren, 1906
