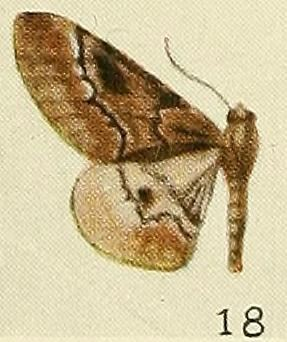

Scientific classification
- Kingdom: Animalia
- Phylum: Arthropoda
- Clade: Pancrustacea
- Class: Insecta
- Order: Lepidoptera
- Family: Geometridae
- Tribe: Boarmiini
- Genus: Exeliopsis; Prout, 1938

= Exeliopsis =

Genus of moths

Exeliopsis is a genus of moths in the family Geometridae erected by Louis Beethoven Prout in 1938.

== Species ==
Some species of this genus are:

- Exeliopsis amygdala Prout L. B., 1938
- Exeliopsis ansorgei (Warren, 1905) (Nigeria)
- Exeliopsis brunnea Viette, 1977 (Madagascar)
- Exeliopsis discipuncta Holloway, 1993 (Borneo)
- Exeliopsis exelisia (Semper) (Philippines)
- Exeliopsis hibernaria (Swinhoe 1886) (India, Indonesia)
- Exeliopsis insulanus Prout L. B., 1938 (Kenya)
- Exeliopsis macrouncus Holloway, 1993 (Borneo, Sumatra, Thailand)
- Exeliopsis perse (Fawcett, 1916) (Kenya)
- Exeliopsis postfasciata Holloway, 1993 (Borneo, Sumatra)
