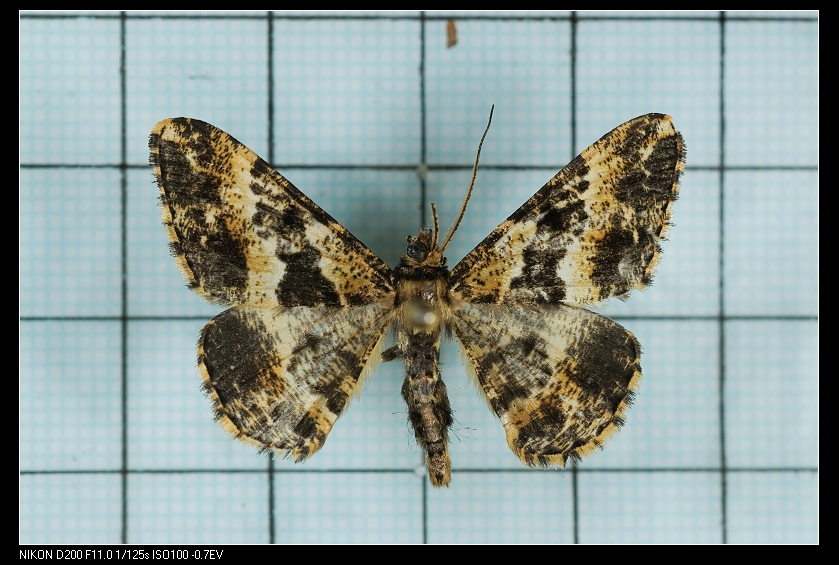
- Harutaea flavizona

Scientific classification
- Kingdom: Animalia
- Phylum: Arthropoda
- Class: Insecta
- Order: Lepidoptera
- Family: Geometridae
- Subfamily: Ennominae
- Tribe: Boarmiini
- Genus: Harutaea; Sato, 2000

= Harutaea =

Genus of moths

Harutaea is a genus of moths in the family Geometridae.

== Species ==
- Harutaea anaflavizona Sato, 2013
- Harutaea conspicuaria (Leech, 1897)
- Harutaea flavizona Sato, 2000
- Harutaea sumatrana Sato, 2000
