= Megalycinia =

Scientific classification
- Kingdom: Animalia
- Phylum: Arthropoda
- Class: Insecta
- Order: Lepidoptera
- Family: Geometridae
- Tribe: Boarmiini
- Genus: Megalycinia; Wehrli, 1939

Genus of moths

Megalycinia is a genus of moths in the family Geometridae first described by Wehrli in 1939.

== Species ==
- Megalycinia serraria (A. Costa, 1882)
- Megalycinia strictaria (Lederer, 1853)
- Megalycinia scalaria (Christoph, 1893)
