= Odysia =

Scientific classification
- Kingdom: Animalia
- Phylum: Arthropoda
- Class: Insecta
- Order: Lepidoptera
- Family: Geometridae
- Tribe: Boarmiini
- Genus: Odysia; Guenée, [1858]

Synonyms
- Isandria Warren, 1897

Genus of moths

Odysia is a genus of moths in the family Geometridae erected by Achille Guenée in 1858.

== Species ==
- Odysia accessilinea Prout, 1910
- Odysia amyntoridaria Oberthür, 1923
- Odysia isoteles Prout, 1933
- Odysia laetipicta Prout, 1931
- Odysia molaria Guenée, [1858]
- Odysia punctilineata Warren, 1900
