= Zernyia =

Scientific classification
- Kingdom: Animalia
- Phylum: Arthropoda
- Clade: Pancrustacea
- Class: Insecta
- Order: Lepidoptera
- Family: Geometridae
- Tribe: Boarmiini
- Genus: Zernyia; L. B. Prout, 1929
- Species: Z. granataria

Binomial name
- Zernyia granataria (Staudinger, 1871)

Genus of moths

Zernyia is a monotypic moth genus in the family Geometridae erected by Louis Beethoven Prout in 1929. Its only species, Zernyia granataria, described by Otto Staudinger in 1871, is found in Spain.
