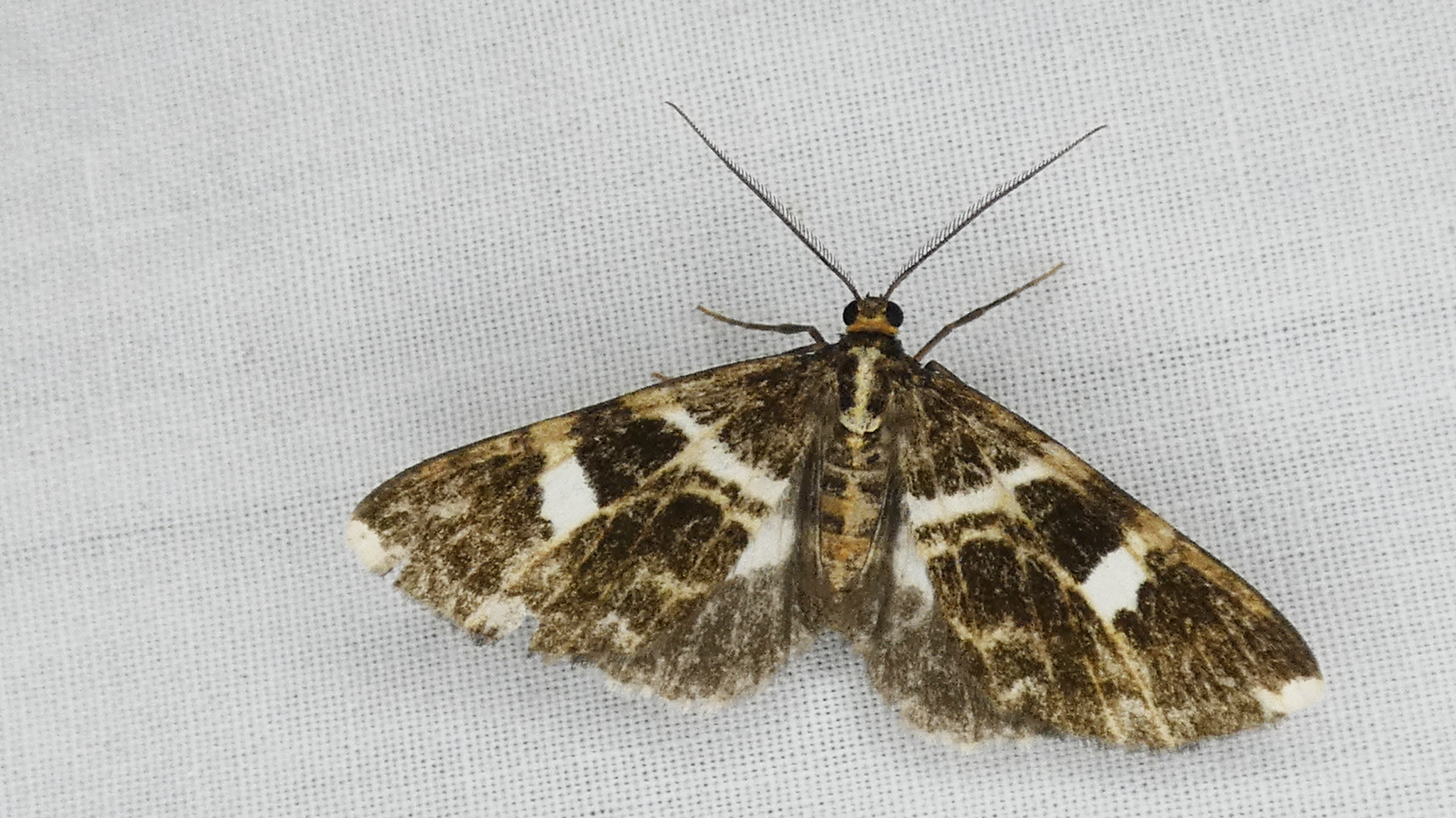
- Melanoscia oreades

Scientific classification
- Kingdom: Animalia
- Phylum: Arthropoda
- Class: Insecta
- Order: Lepidoptera
- Family: Geometridae
- Tribe: Boarmiini
- Genus: Melanoscia; Warren, 1904

Synonyms
- Inca Warren, 1894

= Melanoscia =

Genus of moths

Melanoscia is a genus of moths in the family Geometridae described by Warren in 1904.

== Species ==
- Melanoscia oreades (Druce, 1893) Panama
- Melanoscia felina Warren, 1904 Peru
