= Nigriblephara =

Scientific classification
- Kingdom: Animalia
- Phylum: Arthropoda
- Clade: Pancrustacea
- Class: Insecta
- Order: Lepidoptera
- Family: Geometridae
- Tribe: Boarmiini
- Genus: Nigriblephara; Holloway, 1993

Genus of moths

Nigriblephara is a genus of moths in the family Geometridae erected by Jeremy Daniel Holloway in 1993.

== Species ==
- Nigriblephara semiparata (Walker, 1861) Borneo
- Nigriblephara radula Holloway, 1993 Borneo, Peninsular Malaysia, Sumatra
- Nigriblephara cheyi Holloway, 1993 Borneo
