= Megametopon =

Scientific classification
- Kingdom: Animalia
- Phylum: Arthropoda
- Class: Insecta
- Order: Lepidoptera
- Family: Geometridae
- Tribe: Boarmiini
- Genus: Megametopon; Alphéraky, 1892

Genus of moths

Megametopon is a genus of moths in the family Geometridae erected by Sergei Alphéraky in 1892.

== Species ==
- Megametopon grisolaria (Eversmann, 1848)
- Megametopon amphibolaria (Wehrli, 1922)
