= Pseuderannis =

Scientific classification
- Kingdom: Animalia
- Phylum: Arthropoda
- Class: Insecta
- Order: Lepidoptera
- Family: Geometridae
- Tribe: Boarmiini
- Genus: Pseuderannis; Inoue, 1953

Genus of moths

Pseuderannis is a genus of moths in the family Geometridae described by Inoue in 1953.

== Species ==
- Pseuderannis amplipennis Inoue, 1942
- Pseuderannis lomozemia Prout, 1930
