= Chesiadodes =

Scientific classification
- Kingdom: Animalia
- Phylum: Arthropoda
- Clade: Pancrustacea
- Class: Insecta
- Order: Lepidoptera
- Family: Geometridae
- Subfamily: Ennominae
- Tribe: Boarmiini
- Genus: Chesiadodes; Hulst, 1896

Synonyms
- Jenana Clarke, 1939; Morina Grossbeck, 1912

Genus of moths

Chesiadodes is a genus of moths in the family Geometridae.

== Species ==
- Chesiadodes bicolor Rindge, 1973
- Chesiadodes cinerea Rindge, 1973
- Chesiadodes coniferaria (Grossbeck, 1912)
- Chesiadodes curvata (Barnes & McDunnough, 1916)
- Chesiadodes dissimilis Rindge, 1973
- Chesiadodes fusca Rindge, 1973
- Chesiadodes longa Rindge, 1973
- Chesiadodes morosata Hulst, 1896
- Chesiadodes polingi (Cassino, 1927)
- Chesiadodes simularia (Barnes & McDunnough, 1918)
- Chesiadodes tubercula Rindge, 1973
