= Pseudalcis =

Scientific classification
- Kingdom: Animalia
- Phylum: Arthropoda
- Class: Insecta
- Order: Lepidoptera
- Family: Geometridae
- Tribe: Boarmiini
- Genus: Pseudalcis; Warren, 1897

Genus of moths

Pseudalcis is a genus of moths in the family Geometridae described by Warren in 1897.

== Species ==
- Pseudalcis albata Warren Java, Sumatra
- Pseudalcis renaria Guenée northern India, Myanmar, Thailand
- Pseudalcis catoriata Warren, 1897 Borneo
- Pseudalcis cinerascens Warren, 1897 Borneo
- Pseudalcis trispinaria (Walker, 1860) Thailand
