= Ekboarmia =

Scientific classification
- Kingdom: Animalia
- Phylum: Arthropoda
- Clade: Pancrustacea
- Class: Insecta
- Order: Lepidoptera
- Family: Geometridae
- Tribe: Boarmiini
- Genus: Ekboarmia; Wehrli, 1943

Genus of moths

Ekboarmia is a genus of moths in the family Geometridae.

== Species ==
Per Skou, Stüning & Sihvonen 2017, the genus comprises the following species:

- Ekboarmia atlanticaria (Staudinger, 1859)
  - Exboarmia atlanticaria ssp. holli (Oberthür, 1909)
- Ekboarmia fascinataria (Staudinger, 1900)
- Ekboarmia miniaria Skou, Stüning & Sihvonen, 2017
- Ekboarmia sagnesi Dufay, 1979
