= Zanclopera =

Scientific classification
- Kingdom: Animalia
- Phylum: Arthropoda
- Class: Insecta
- Order: Lepidoptera
- Family: Geometridae
- Tribe: Boarmiini
- Genus: Zanclopera; Warren, 1894

Genus of moths

Zanclopera is a genus of moths in the family Geometridae described by Warren in 1894.

== Species ==
- Zanclopera falcata Warren, 1894 north-eastern Himalayas, southern China, Taiwan, Myanmar, Peninsular Malaysia, Borneo
- Zanclopera straminearia Leech, 1897 China
