= Eutomopepla =

Scientific classification
- Kingdom: Animalia
- Phylum: Arthropoda
- Class: Insecta
- Order: Lepidoptera
- Family: Geometridae
- Tribe: Boarmiini
- Genus: Eutomopepla; Warren, 1894
- Species: E. annulipes

Binomial name
- Eutomopepla annulipes (Felder & Rogenhofer, 1875)

Genus of moths

Eutomopepla is a monotypic moth genus in the family Geometridae described by Warren in 1894. Its only species, Eutomopepla annulipes, was described by Felder and Rogenhofer in 1875. It is found in the Amazon basin.
