= Diplublephara =

Scientific classification
- Kingdom: Animalia
- Phylum: Arthropoda
- Class: Insecta
- Order: Lepidoptera
- Family: Geometridae
- Tribe: Boarmiini
- Genus: Diplublephara; Sato, 1995
- Species: D. cornujuxta

Binomial name
- Diplublephara cornujuxta Sato, 1995

Genus of moths

Diplublephara is a monotypic moth genus in the family Geometridae. Its only species, Diplublephara cornujuxta, is found in Sulawesi, Indonesia. Both the genus and the species were described by Sato in 1995.
