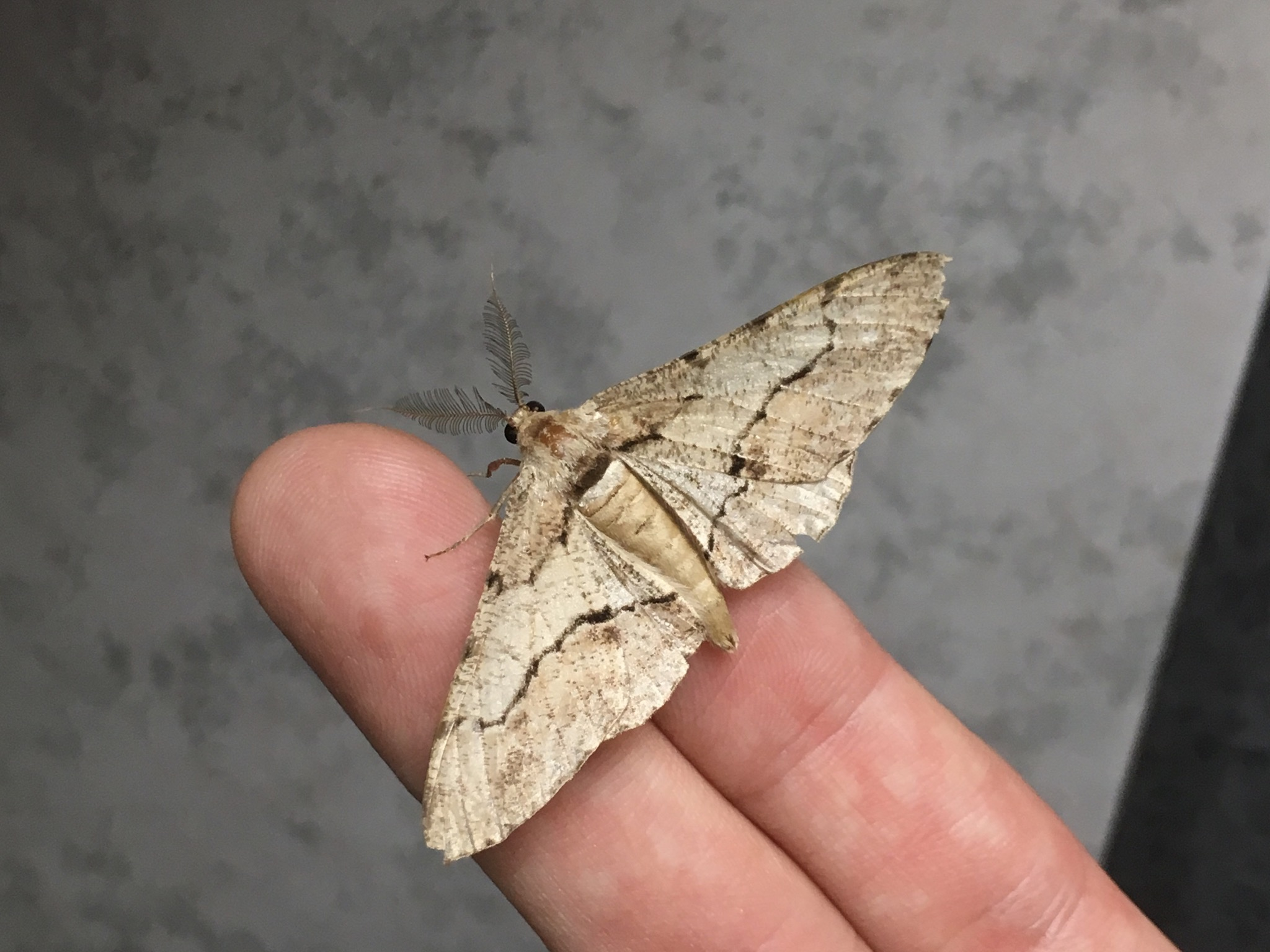

Scientific classification
- Kingdom: Animalia
- Phylum: Arthropoda
- Class: Insecta
- Order: Lepidoptera
- Family: Geometridae
- Tribe: Boarmiini
- Genus: Phthonosema; Warren, 1894

= Phthonosema =

Genus of moths

Phthonosema is a genus of moths in the family Geometridae described by Warren in 1894.

== Species ==
- Phthonosema tendinosaria (Bremer, 1864)
- Phthonosema invenustaria (Leech, 1891)
- Phthonosema phantomaria (Graeser, 1880)
- Phthonosema serratilinea (Leech, 1897)
