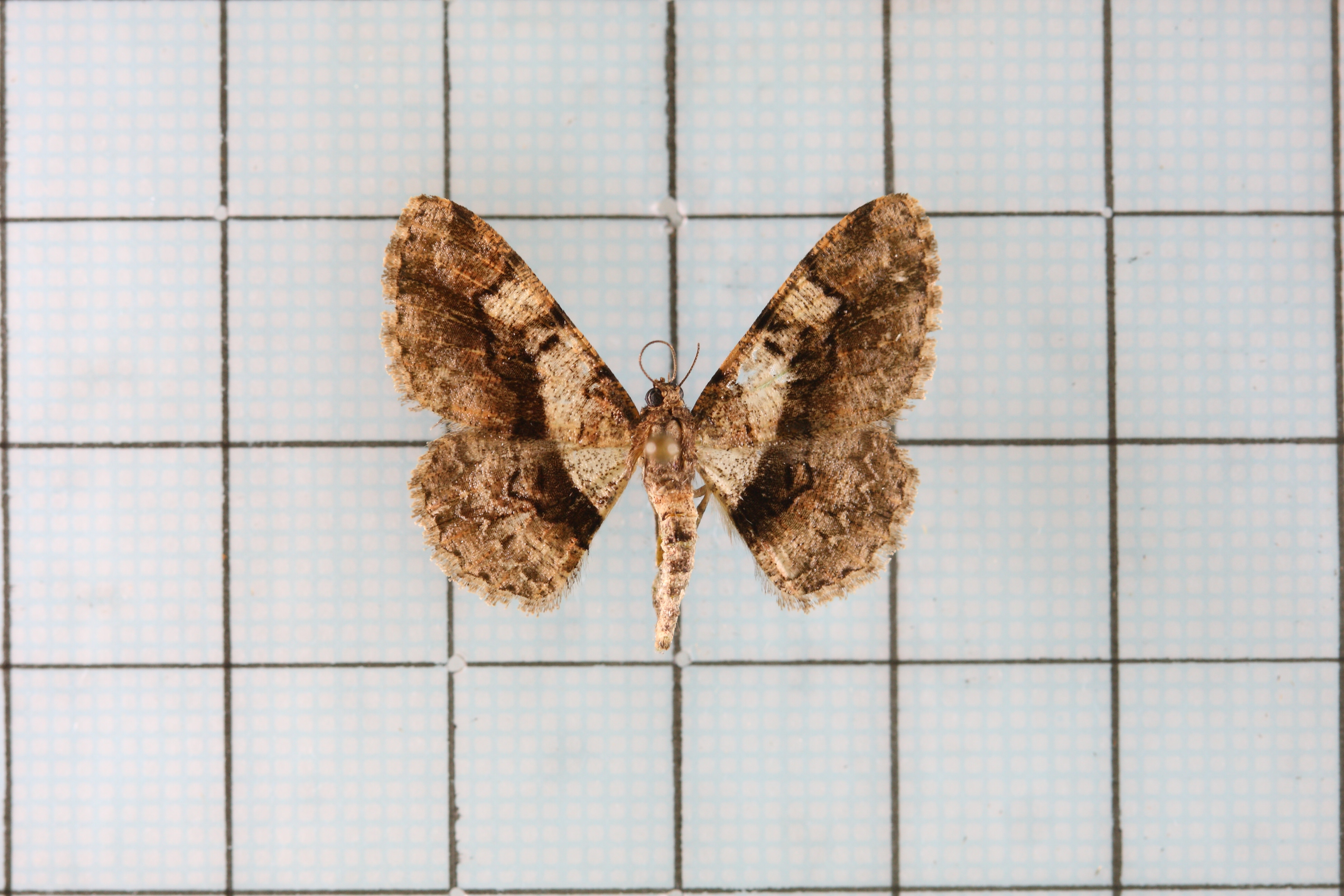

Scientific classification
- Kingdom: Animalia
- Phylum: Arthropoda
- Class: Insecta
- Order: Lepidoptera
- Family: Geometridae
- Tribe: Boarmiini
- Genus: Diplurodes; Warren, 1896

= Diplurodes =

Genus of moths

Diplurodes is a genus of moths in the family Geometridae.

== Species ==
- Diplurodes decursaria (Walker, 1862)
- Diplurodes indentata Warren, 1897
- Diplurodes inundata Prout, 1929
- Diplurodes kerangatis Holloway, 1993
- Diplurodes petras (Meyrick, 1897)
- Diplurodes semicircularis Holloway, 1993
- Diplurodes sinecoremata Holloway, 1993
- Diplurodes submontana Holloway, 1976
- Diplurodes sugillata Prout, 1932
- Diplurodes triangulata Holloway, 1993
- Diplurodes vestita Warren, 1896
