= Calamodes =

Scientific classification
- Kingdom: Animalia
- Phylum: Arthropoda
- Class: Insecta
- Order: Lepidoptera
- Family: Geometridae
- Subfamily: Ennominae
- Tribe: Boarmiini
- Genus: Calamodes; Guenée, 1857

Species
- See text

Genus of moths

Calamodes is a genus of moths in the family Geometridae.

== Species ==
- Calamodes occitanaria (Duponchel, 1829)
- Calamodes subscudularia (Turati, 1919)
