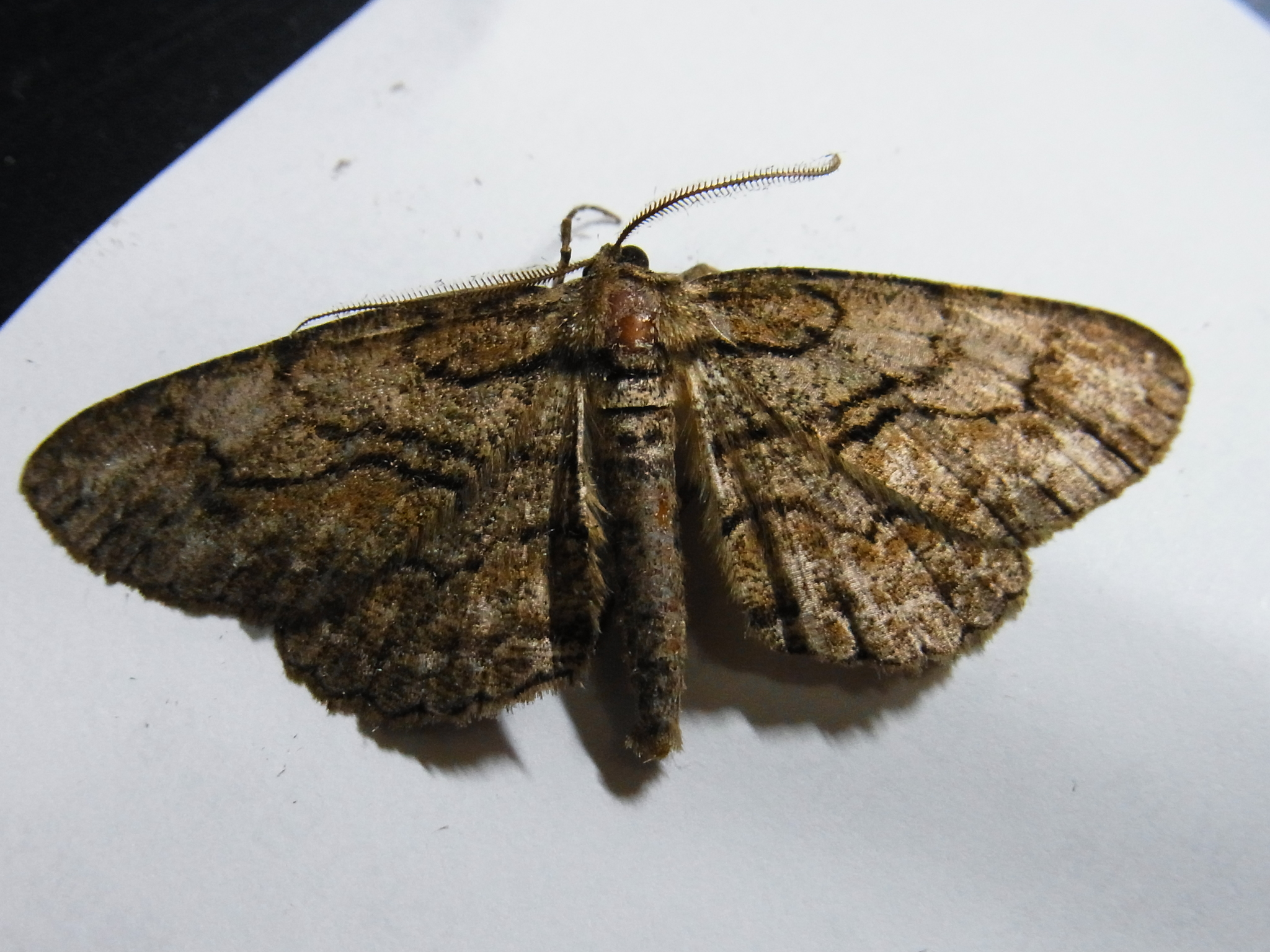
- Heterarmia charon

Scientific classification
- Kingdom: Animalia
- Phylum: Arthropoda
- Class: Insecta
- Order: Lepidoptera
- Family: Geometridae
- Tribe: Boarmiini
- Genus: Heterarmia; Warren, 1895

= Heterarmia =

Genus of moths

Heterarmia is a genus of moths in the family Geometridae described by Warren in 1895.

== Species ==
- Heterarmia appositaria (Leech, 1897)
- Heterarmia buettneri (Hedemann, 1881)
- Heterarmia charon (Butler, 1878)
- Heterarmia dissimilis (Staudinger, 1897)
