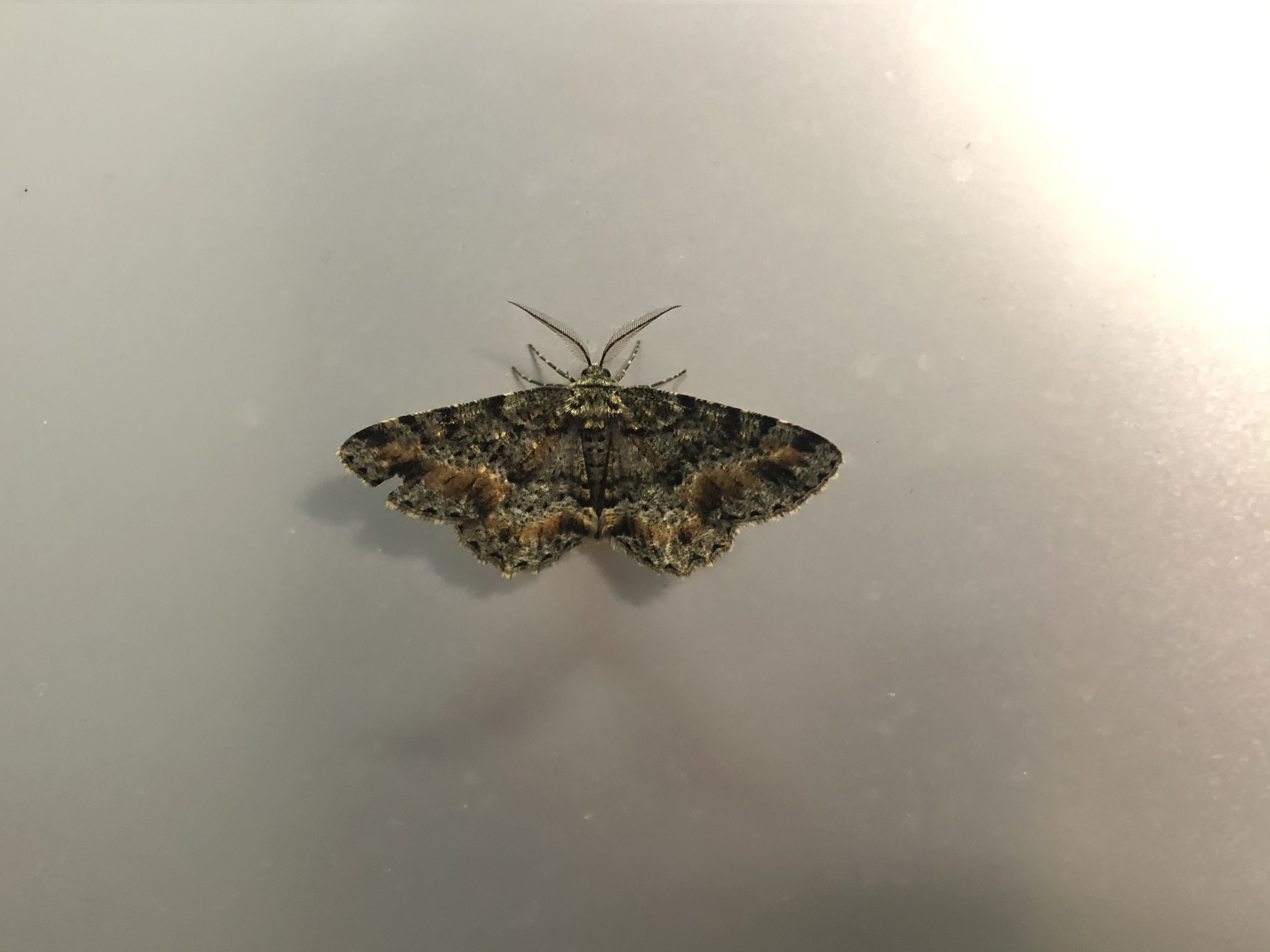
- Calicha ornataria onnataria

Scientific classification
- Domain: Eukaryota
- Kingdom: Animalia
- Phylum: Arthropoda
- Class: Insecta
- Order: Lepidoptera
- Family: Geometridae
- Subfamily: Ennominae
- Tribe: Boarmiini
- Genus: Calicha; Moore, 1888

Species
- See text

= Calicha =

Genus of moths

Calicha is a genus of moths in the family Geometridae.

== Species ==
- Calicha nooraria (Bremer, 1864), China, Korea
- Calicha ornataria (Leech, 1891), Japan, Korea
- Calicha griseoviridata (Leech, 1897), Taiwan
