= Dasypteroma =

Scientific classification
- Kingdom: Animalia
- Phylum: Arthropoda
- Class: Insecta
- Order: Lepidoptera
- Family: Geometridae
- Tribe: Boarmiini
- Genus: Dasypteroma; Staudinger, 1892
- Species: D. thaumasia

Binomial name
- Dasypteroma thaumasia Staudinger, 1892

Genus of moths

Dasypteroma is a monotypic moth genus in the family Geometridae. Its only species, Dasypteroma thaumasia, is found in Spain. Both the genus and species were first described by Otto Staudinger in 1892.
