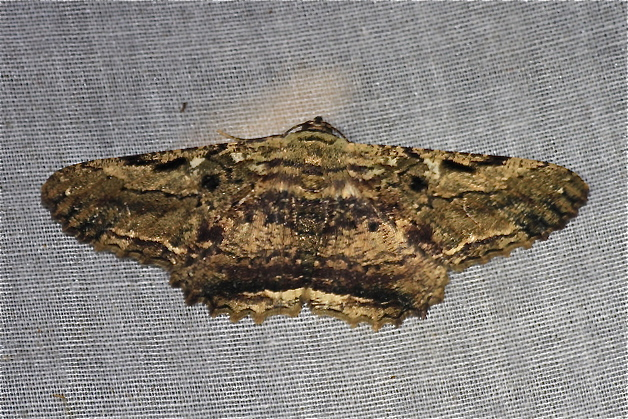
- Male Ruttellerona lithina from the Trusmadi area of Borneo

Scientific classification
- Kingdom: Animalia
- Phylum: Arthropoda
- Class: Insecta
- Order: Lepidoptera
- Family: Geometridae
- Tribe: Boarmiini
- Genus: Ruttellerona; C. Swinhoe, 1894

Type species
- Ruttellerona cessaria Walker, 1860

= Ruttellerona =

Genus of moths

Ruttellerona is a genus of moths in the family Geometridae first described by Charles Swinhoe in 1894.

== Species ==
Some species of this genus are:

- Ruttellerona cessaria Walker, 1860
- Ruttellerona harmonica Hampson, 1898
- Ruttellerona kalisi Prout, 1935
- Ruttellerona lithina Warren, 1903
- Ruttellerona obsequens Prout, 1929
- Ruttellerona pallicostaria Moore, 1868
- Ruttellerona presbytica Robinson, 1975
- Ruttellerona pseudocessaria Holloway, 1994
- Ruttellerona pulverulenta Warren, 1897
- Ruttellerona scotozonea Hampson, 1900
- Ruttellerona stigmaticosta Prout, 1928
