= Polyacme =

Scientific classification
- Kingdom: Animalia
- Phylum: Arthropoda
- Class: Insecta
- Order: Lepidoptera
- Family: Geometridae
- Genus: Polyacme; Warren, 1896

Synonyms
- Anisographe Warren, 1897; Gonophaga Warren, 1897

Genus of moths

Polyacme is a genus of moths in the family Geometridae. The genus was described by Warren in 1896. Both species are from Australia.

== Species ==
- Polyacme dissimilis (Warren, 1897)
- Polyacme subpulchra (Warren, 1897) Queensland
