= Ateloptila =

Scientific classification
- Kingdom: Animalia
- Phylum: Arthropoda
- Class: Insecta
- Order: Lepidoptera
- Family: Geometridae
- Subfamily: Ennominae
- Genus: Ateloptila; Meyrick, 1886
- Species: A. confusa

Binomial name
- Ateloptila confusa Warren, 1900

Genus of moths

Ateloptila is a monotypic moth genus in the family Geometridae erected by Edward Meyrick in 1886. Its only species, Ateloptila confusa, first described by Warren in 1900, is found in Australia.
