= Athroolopha =

Scientific classification
- Kingdom: Animalia
- Phylum: Arthropoda
- Class: Insecta
- Order: Lepidoptera
- Family: Geometridae
- Tribe: Ourapterygini
- Genus: Athroolopha; Lederer, 1853

Genus of moths

Athroolopha is a genus of moths in the family Geometridae.

== Species ==
- Athroolopha chrysitaria (Geyer, 1831)
- Athroolopha pennigeraria (Hübner, 1813)
