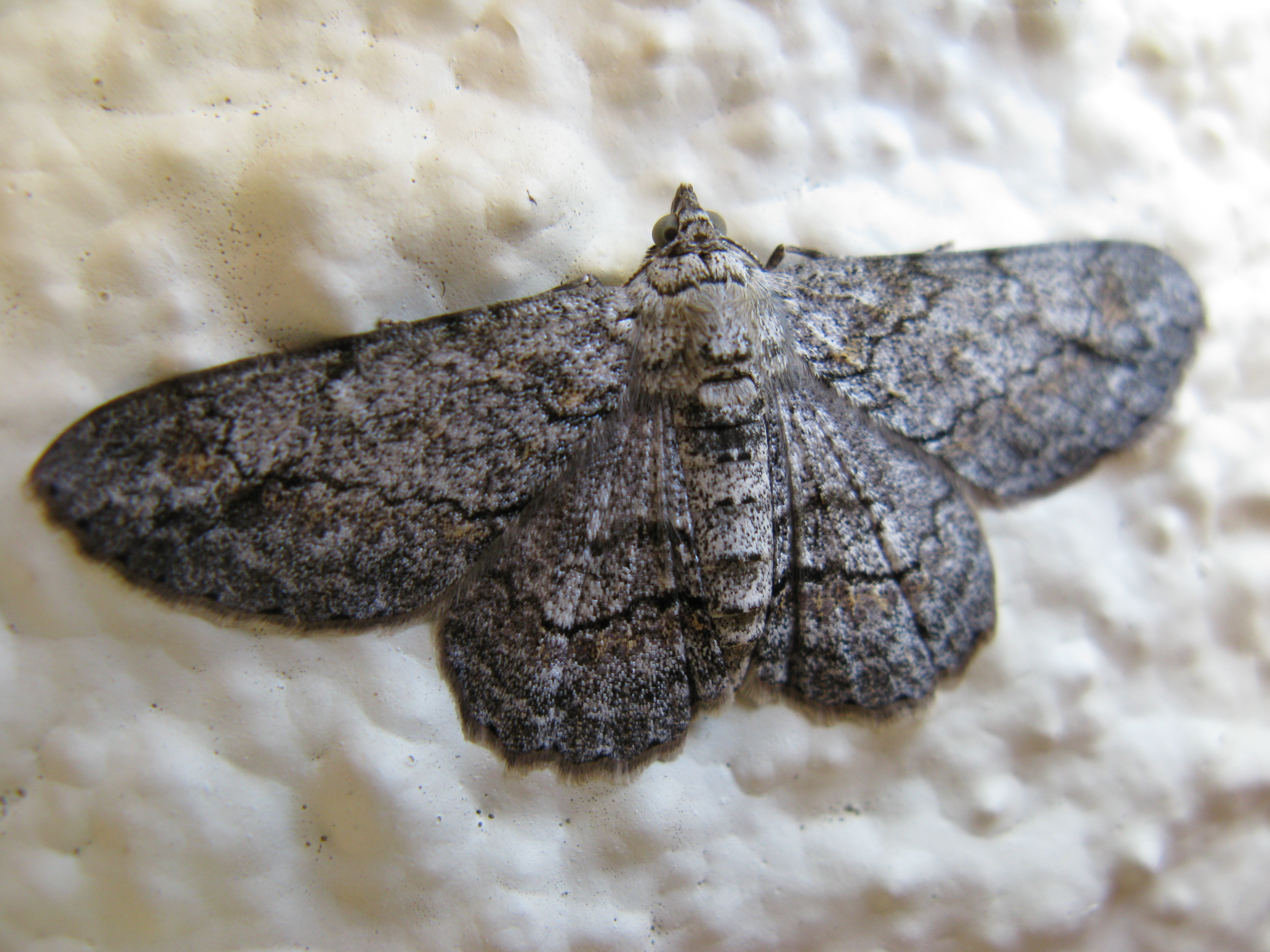
- Eulycia species in South Africa

Scientific classification
- Kingdom: Animalia
- Phylum: Arthropoda
- Class: Insecta
- Order: Lepidoptera
- Family: Geometridae
- Genus: Eulycia; Janse, 1932

= Eulycia =

Genus of moths

Eulycia is a genus of moths in the family Geometridae described by Anthonie Johannes Theodorus Janse in 1932.

== Species ==
- Eulycia grisea Warren, 1897
  - Eulycia grisea apysta Prout, 1938
  - Eulycia grisea eugonia Prout, 1938
- Eulycia accentuata Felder & Rogenhofer, 1875
- Eulycia extorris Warren, 1904
- Eulycia subpunctata Warren, 1897
