= Anavinemina =

Scientific classification
- Kingdom: Animalia
- Phylum: Arthropoda
- Class: Insecta
- Order: Lepidoptera
- Family: Geometridae
- Subfamily: Ennominae
- Genus: Anavinemina; Rindge, 1964

Genus of geometer moths

Anavinemina is a genus of moths in the family Geometridae described by Frederick H. Rindge in 1964.

== Species ==
- Anavinemina acomos Rindge, 1990
- Anavinemina aequilibera Prout, 1933
- Anavinemina axica Druce, 1892
- Anavinemina axicata Rindge, 1964
- Anavinemina brachiata Rindge, 1990
- Anavinemina evexa Rindge, 1990
- Anavinemina indistincta Warren, 1906
- Anavinemina lunaris Rindge, 1990
- Anavinemina molybra Rindge, 1964
- Anavinemina muraena Druce, 1892
- Anavinemina orphna Rindge, 1964
- Anavinemina promuraena Rindge, 1964
- Anavinemina rindgei Beutelspacher-Baigts, 1981
- Anavinemina semicircula Rindge, 1990
- Anavinemina striola Rindge, 1990
- Anavinemina wellingi Rindge, 1990
