= Callocasta =

Scientific classification
- Kingdom: Animalia
- Phylum: Arthropoda
- Class: Insecta
- Order: Lepidoptera
- Family: Geometridae
- Subfamily: Ennominae
- Genus: Callocasta; C. Swinhoe, 1894
- Species: C. similis

Binomial name
- Callocasta similis (Moore, 1888)

Genus of moths

Callocasta is a monotypic moth genus in the family Geometridae described by Charles Swinhoe in 1894. Its only species, Callocasta similis, described by Frederic Moore in 1888, is found in Darjeeling, India.
