= Heterogena =

Scientific classification
- Kingdom: Animalia
- Phylum: Arthropoda
- Class: Insecta
- Order: Lepidoptera
- Family: Geometridae
- Genus: Heterogena; Turner, 1947
- Species: H. exitela

Binomial name
- Heterogena exitela Turner, 1947

Genus of moths

Heterogena is a monotypic moth genus in the family Geometridae. Its only species, Heterogena exitela, is found in Australia. The genus and species were described by Turner in 1947.
