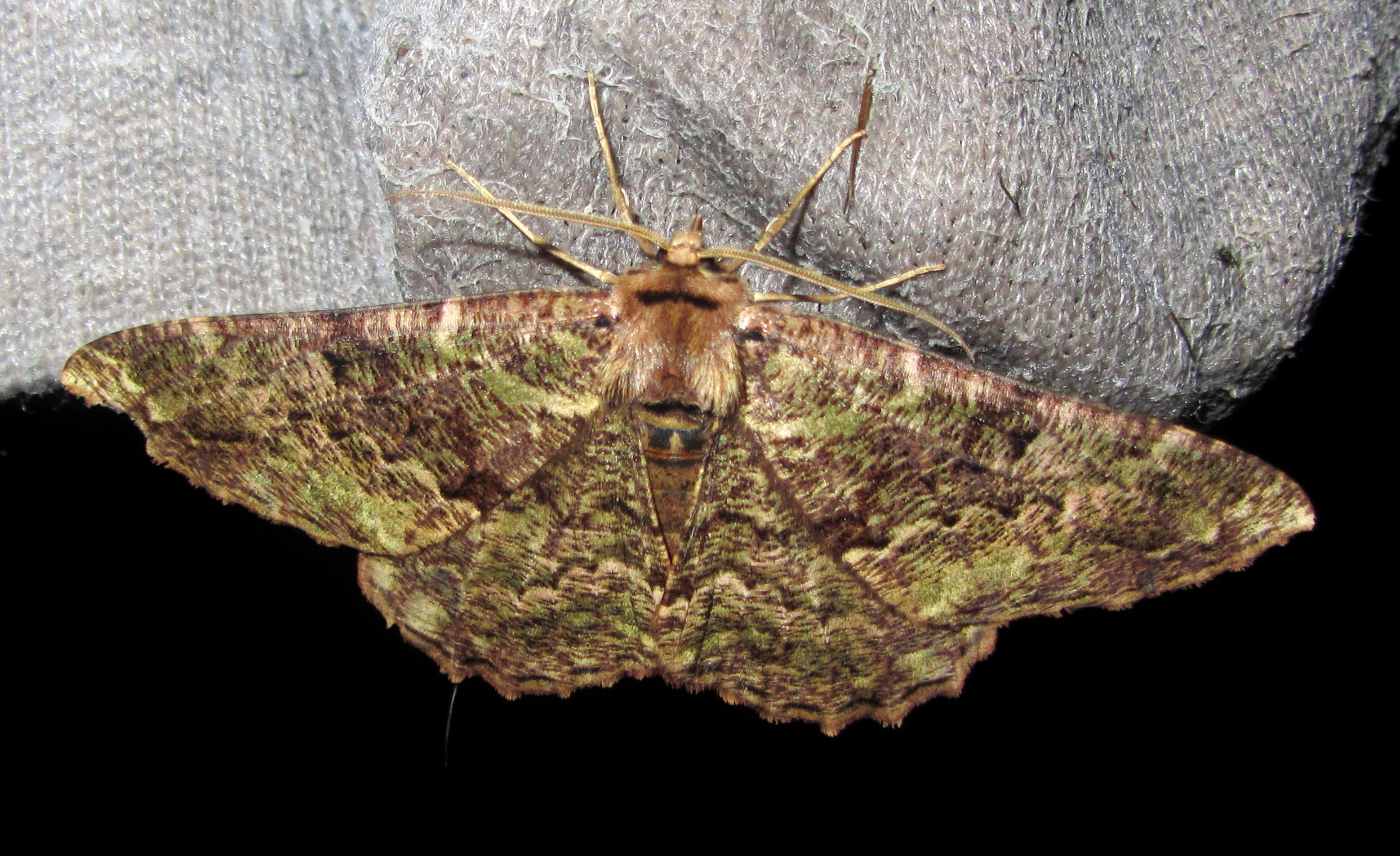

Scientific classification
- Kingdom: Animalia
- Phylum: Arthropoda
- Class: Insecta
- Order: Lepidoptera
- Family: Geometridae
- Subfamily: Ennominae
- Genus: Blepharoctenucha; Warren, 1895
- Species: B. virescens

Binomial name
- Blepharoctenucha virescens Butler, 1880

= Blepharoctenucha =

Genus of moths

Blepharoctenucha is a monotypic moth genus in the family Geometridae described by Warren in 1895. Its only species, Blepharoctenucha virescens, first described by Arthur Gardiner Butler in 1880, is known from India and Taiwan.

It has one subspecies, Blepharoctenucha virescens ssp. kawabei, described by Hiroshi Inoue in 1986.
