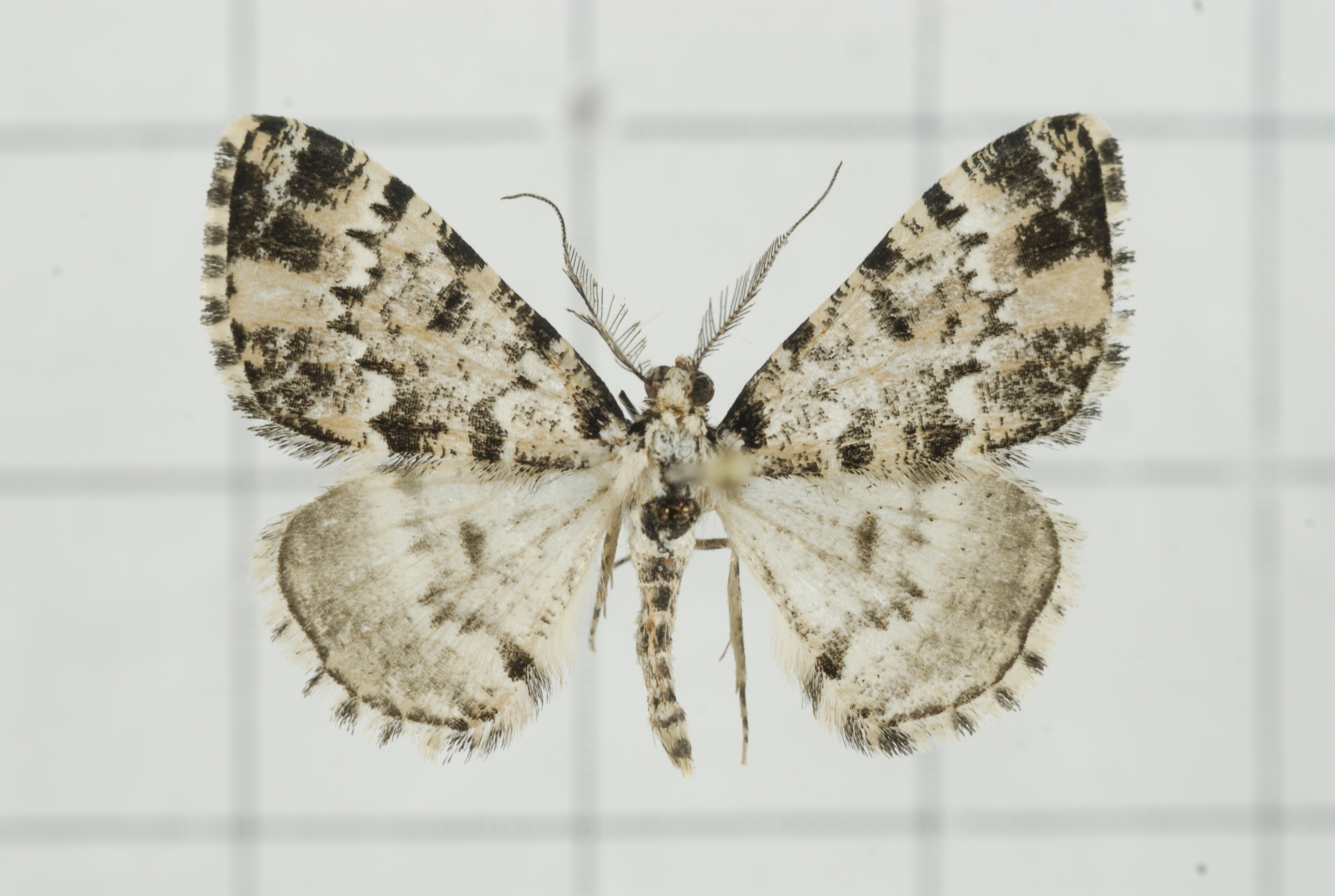
- Prochasma dentilinea

Scientific classification
- Kingdom: Animalia
- Phylum: Arthropoda
- Clade: Pancrustacea
- Class: Insecta
- Order: Lepidoptera
- Family: Geometridae
- Subfamily: Ennominae
- Genus: Prochasma; Warren, 1897

= Prochasma =

Genus of moths

Prochasma is a genus of moths in the family Geometridae. It was described by William Warren in 1897. It occurs in South, East, and Southeast Asia, including Maritime Southeast Asia.

Prochasma are small moths with wingspans of 18–25 mm. Males (forewing length: 10–15 mm) are slightly smaller than females (forewing length: 11–16 mm).

== Species ==
There are eight recognized species:

- Prochasma albimonilis Prout, 1927 – Myanmar, Laos, Vietnam
- Prochasma dentilinea (Warren, 1893) – India, Nepal, Myanmar, Thailand, Laos, Vietnam, SW China
- Prochasma diaoluoensis Liu & Stüning, 2024 – Hainan
- Prochasma kishidana Sato, 2019 – Peninsular Malaysia, Borneo, Sumatra
- Prochasma mimica Warren, 1897 – north-eastern Himalayas
- Prochasma parasqualida Sato, 2023 – Vietnam, Laos, Thailand
- Prochasma sasakiana Sato, 2019 – Borneo
- Prochasma squalida (Wileman, 1915) – Taiwan
