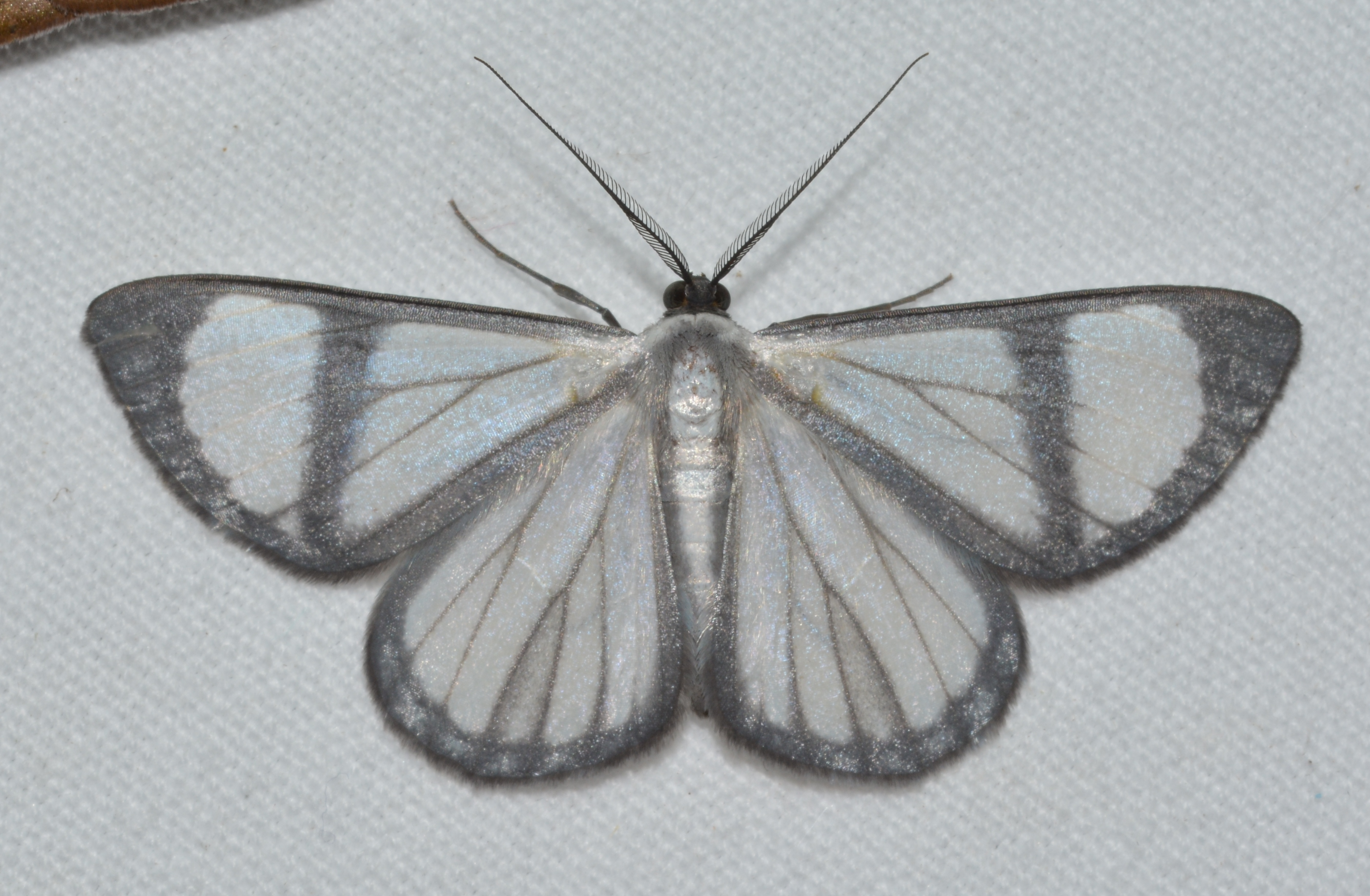
- Perigramma famulata

Scientific classification
- Kingdom: Animalia
- Phylum: Arthropoda
- Class: Insecta
- Order: Lepidoptera
- Family: Geometridae
- Genus: Perigramma; Guenée in Boisduval & Guenée, 1857

Synonyms
- Genussa Walker, [1865]

= Perigramma =

Genus of moths

Perigramma is a genus of moths in the family Geometridae erected by Achille Guenée in 1857.

== Species ==
- Perigramma canescens (Walker, [1865])
- Perigramma celerenaria (Walker, [1865])
- Perigramma nervaria Guenée, 1857
