= Antiphoides =

Scientific classification
- Kingdom: Animalia
- Phylum: Arthropoda
- Class: Insecta
- Order: Lepidoptera
- Family: Geometridae
- Subfamily: Ennominae
- Genus: Antiphoides; Rindge, 1990

Genus of geometer moths

Antiphoides is a genus of moths in the family Geometridae. The genus was erected by Frederick H. Rindge in 1990.

== Species ==
- Antiphoides dentata Dyar, 1918
- Antiphoides errantaria McDunnough, 1940
