= Anacleora =

Scientific classification
- Kingdom: Animalia
- Phylum: Arthropoda
- Class: Insecta
- Order: Lepidoptera
- Family: Geometridae
- Subfamily: Ennominae
- Genus: Anacleora; Janse, 1932

Genus of geometer moths

Anacleora is a genus of moths in the family Geometridae. The genus was first described by Anthonie Johannes Theodorus Janse in 1932.

== Species ==
- Anacleora pulverosa Warren, 1904
- Anacleora extremaria Walker, 1860
- Anacleora diffusa Walker, 1869
