= Biclavigera =

Scientific classification
- Kingdom: Animalia
- Phylum: Arthropoda
- Class: Insecta
- Order: Lepidoptera
- Family: Geometridae
- Subfamily: Ennominae
- Genus: Biclavigera; Warren, 1894

Genus of moths

Biclavigera is a genus of moths in the family Geometridae.

== Species ==
- Biclavigera praecanaria (Herrich-Schäffer, [1855])
- Biclavigera rufivena (Warren, 1911)
