= Apheloceros =

Scientific classification
- Kingdom: Animalia
- Phylum: Arthropoda
- Class: Insecta
- Order: Lepidoptera
- Family: Geometridae
- Subfamily: Ennominae
- Genus: Apheloceros; Turner, 1947
- Species: A. dasciodes

Binomial name
- Apheloceros dasciodes Turner, 1947

Monotypic genus of geometer moths

Apheloceros is a monotypic moth genus in the family Geometridae. Its single species, Apheloceros dasciodes, is found in Australia. Both the species and genus were first described by Alfred Jefferis Turner in 1947.
