= Ephalaenia =

Scientific classification
- Kingdom: Animalia
- Phylum: Arthropoda
- Class: Insecta
- Order: Lepidoptera
- Family: Geometridae
- Subfamily: Ennominae
- Genus: Ephalaenia; Wehrli, 1936

Genus of moths

Ephalaenia is a genus of moths in the family Geometridae described by Wehrli in 1936.

== Species ==
- Ephalaenia variaria Leech, 1897
- Ephalaenia xylina Wehrli, 1936
