= Eubarnesia =

Scientific classification
- Kingdom: Animalia
- Phylum: Arthropoda
- Class: Insecta
- Order: Lepidoptera
- Family: Geometridae
- Genus: Eubarnesia; Cockerell, 1917
- Species: E. ritaria

Binomial name
- Eubarnesia ritaria (Grossbeck, 1910)

Genus of moths

Eubarnesia is a monotypic moth genus in the family Geometridae erected by Theodore Dru Alison Cockerell in 1917. Its only species, Eubarnesia ritaria, described by Grossbeck in 1910, is found in the American South West.
