= Astalotesia =

Scientific classification
- Kingdom: Animalia
- Phylum: Arthropoda
- Class: Insecta
- Order: Lepidoptera
- Family: Geometridae
- Subfamily: Ennominae
- Genus: Astalotesia; Ferguson, Blanchard & Knudson, 1983
- Species: A. bucurvata

Binomial name
- Astalotesia bucurvata Ferguson, Blanchard & Knudson, 1983

Genus of moths

Astalotesia is a monotypic moth genus in the family Geometridae. Its only species, Astalotesia bucurvata, is found in the US state of Texas. Both the genus and species were first described by Douglas C. Ferguson, André Blanchard and Ed Knudson in 1983.
