= Phyllometra =

Scientific classification
- Kingdom: Animalia
- Phylum: Arthropoda
- Class: Insecta
- Order: Lepidoptera
- Family: Geometridae
- Tribe: Boarmiini
- Genus: Phyllometra; Boisduval, 1840

Synonyms
- Egea Duponchel, 1845

Genus of moths

Phyllometra is a genus of moths in the family Geometridae erected by Jean Baptiste Boisduval in 1840.

== Species ==
- Phyllometra culminaria (Eversmann, 1843)
- Phyllometra teneraria (Staudinger, 1892)
