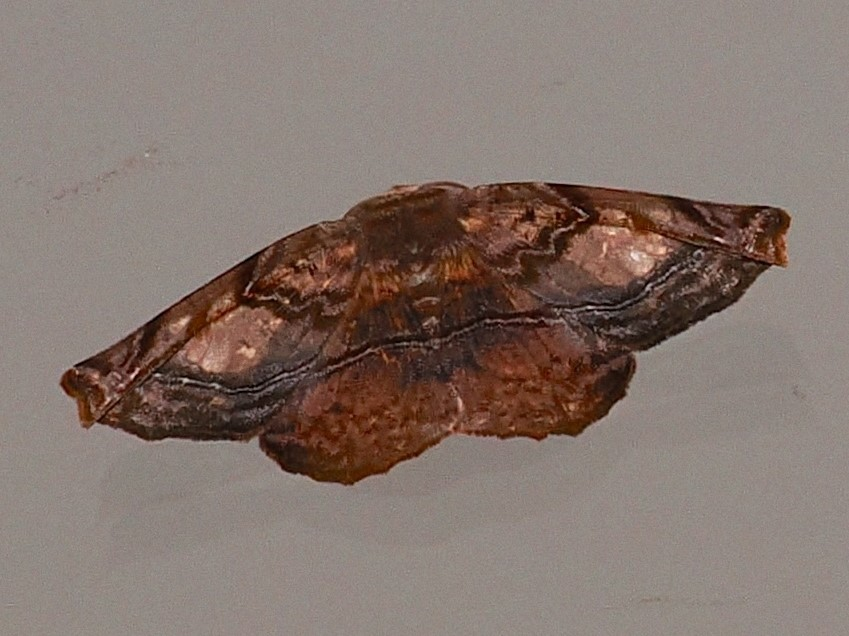
- Acrotomodes ingridae

Scientific classification
- Kingdom: Animalia
- Phylum: Arthropoda
- Class: Insecta
- Order: Lepidoptera
- Family: Geometridae
- Tribe: Ourapterygini
- Genus: Acrotomodes; Warren, 1895

= Acrotomodes =

Genus of geometer moths

Acrotomodes is a genus of moths in the family Geometridae.

== Species ==
- Acrotomodes amplificata Dognin, 1924
- Acrotomodes bola Druce, 1892
- Acrotomodes borumata Schaus, 1901
- Acrotomodes casta Prout, 1910
- Acrotomodes chiriquensis Schaus, 1901
- Acrotomodes cretinotata Dognin, 1902
- Acrotomodes croceata Warren, 1905
- Acrotomodes erodita Debauche, 1937
- Acrotomodes hemixantha Prout, 1910
- Acrotomodes hepaticata Warren, 1895
- Acrotomodes hielaria Schaus, 1901
- Acrotomodes leprosata Warren, 1907
- Acrotomodes lichenifera Warren, 1904
- Acrotomodes nigripuncta Warren, 1897
- Acrotomodes nigroapicata Dognin, 1924
- Acrotomodes olivacea Bastelberger, 1908
- Acrotomodes polla Druce, 1892
- Acrotomodes puma Warren, 1895
- Acrotomodes sporadata Warren, 1905
- Acrotomodes unicolor Warren, 1906
