= Deinotrichia =

Scientific classification
- Kingdom: Animalia
- Phylum: Arthropoda
- Class: Insecta
- Order: Lepidoptera
- Family: Geometridae
- Subfamily: Ennominae
- Genus: Deinotrichia; Warren, 1893
- Species: D. scotosiaria

Binomial name
- Deinotrichia scotosiaria Warren, 1893

Genus of moths

Deinotrichia is a monotypic moth genus in the family Geometridae described by Warren in 1893. Its only species, Deinotrichia scotosiaria, was described by the same author in the same year. The species was described from Sikkim, India.
