= Dyscheralcis =

Scientific classification
- Kingdom: Animalia
- Phylum: Arthropoda
- Clade: Pancrustacea
- Class: Insecta
- Order: Lepidoptera
- Family: Geometridae
- Subfamily: Ennominae
- Genus: Dyscheralcis; L. B. Prout, 1916

Genus of moths

Dyscheralcis is a genus of moths in the family Geometridae. The genus was erected by Louis Beethoven Prout in 1916.

== Species ==
- Dyscheralcis retroflexa L. B. Prout, 1916
- Dyscheralcis crimnodes Turner, 1917
