= List of geometrid genera: E =

The very large moth family Geometridae contains genera beginning with A, B, C, D, E, F, G, H, I, J, K, L, M, N, O, P, Q, R, S, T, U, V, W, X, Y and Z.

Those beginning with E include:

- Eariodes
- Earophila
- Earoxyptera
- Ecchloropsis
- Eccoptopteryx
- Eccymatoge
- Echthrocollix
- Ecleora
- Ecliptopera
- Ecnomophlebia
- Ecodonia
- Ecpatites
- Ecpetala
- Ecpetelia
- Ecphyas
- Ecphysis
- Ectephrina
- Ectropidia
- Ectropis
- Egabra
- Eilicrinia
- Eisothistes
- Ekboarmia
- Ekfidonia
- Electrophaes
- Ellipostoma
- Elophos
- Elphos
- Elpiste
- Elvia
- Ematurga
- Emmelesia
- Emmesocoma
- Emmesura
- Emmiltis
- Emplocia
- Empriononyx
- Enanthyperythra
- Enantiodes
- Enchocrana
- Enchoria
- Encoma
- Enconista
- Encryphia
- Endemia
- Endropia
- Endropiodes
- Energopteryx
- Ennada
- Ennomos
- Entephria
- Entogonia
- Entomopteryx
- Enypia
- Eoa
- Eoasthena
- Eois
- Epamraica
- Epelis
- Ephalaenia
- Ephemerophila
- Epholca
- Epicampyla
- Epicasis
- Epicleta
- Epicompsa
- Epicosymbia
- Epicterodes
- Epicyme
- Epidesmia
- Epifidonia
- Epigelasma
- Epigynopteryx
- Epilobophora
- Epimacaria
- Epimecis
- Epione
- Epiphryne
- Epipristis
- Epirranthis
- Epirrhoe
- Epirrita
- Episauris
- Episemasia
- Episothalma
- Episteira
- Epitherapis
- Epitherina
- Epobeidia
- Epyaxa
- Erannis
- Erastria
- Erateina
- Erebabraxas
- Erebochlora
- Erebomorpha
- Eremocentra
- Eremodorea
- Eretmopus
- Ereunetea
- Ergavia
- Erilophodes
- Erinobia
- Eriopithex
- Erioptereta
- Eriopygidia
- Eriplatymetra
- Erobatodes
- Erosina
- Erschoffia
- Ersephila
- Erycinopsis
- Erythrolophus
- Esakiopteryx
- Eschatarchia
- Euacidalia
- Eualloea
- Euangerona
- Euarestus
- Euaspilates
- Eubaphe
- Eubarnesia
- Eubolia
- Eubordeta
- Eubyja
- Eubyjodonta
- Eucaterva
- Eucela
- Eucharidema
- Euchlaena
- Euchlidon
- Euchoeca
- Euchristophia
- Euchrognophos
- Eucidalia
- Euclidiodes
- Euclysia
- Eucosmabraxas
- Eucrostes
- Euctenachlora
- Euctenostega
- Euctenurapteryx
- Eucyclodes
- Eucymatoge
- Eudjakonovia
- Eudrepanulatrix
- Eudule
- Eudulophasia
- Eudyscia
- Eueana
- Euephyra
- Eueupithecia
- Euexia
- Eufidonia
- Eufitchia
- Eugnesia
- Eugonobapta
- Euippe
- Eulithis
- Euloxia
- Eulycia
- Eulygdia
- Eulygris
- Eumacaria
- Eumacrodes
- Eumannia
- Eumeekia
- Eumegethes
- Eumelea
- Eumera
- Eumilionia
- Eunemoria
- Eunoumeana
- Eunychiodes
- Euomoea
- Eupagia
- Euperizoma
- Euphanessa
- Euphenolia
- Euphronarcha
- Euphyia
- Eupileta
- Eupisteria
- Eupithecia
- Eupithecidia
- Eupithystis
- Euproutia
- Eupsamma
- Euptychopoda
- Eurhinosea
- Eurranthis
- Eurychoria
- Euryobeidia
- Eurypeplodes
- Eurytaphria
- Eurythecodes
- Eusarca
- Euschema
- Eusebia
- Eusenea
- Eustegania
- Eustenophasma
- Eustroma
- Euthysana
- Eutoea
- Eutomopepla
- Eutrapela
- Eutrepsia
- Eutriphosa
- Eutropa
- Euturneria
- Euxena
- Euzimmermania
- Eva
- Evarzia
- Evecliptopera
- Evita
- Exangerona
- Exeliopsis
- Exelis
- Exheterolocha
- Exodezia
- Exurapteryx
