= EOA =

EOA may refer to:

- Eoa (moth), a genus of moth
- Early-onset Alzheimer's disease, Alzheimer's disease diagnosed before the age of 65
- Empire of Austenasia, a micronation and self-declared sovereign state in the United Kingdom
- Encyclopedia of Arkansas History & Culture, a web-based reference work
- Euroa railway station, Australia
- Eve of Alana, a German band
- East of Adelaide, a collection of neighbourhoods in London, Ontario
- Effective orifice area, a quality measure for artificial heart valves
- End of address, an ASCII control code
