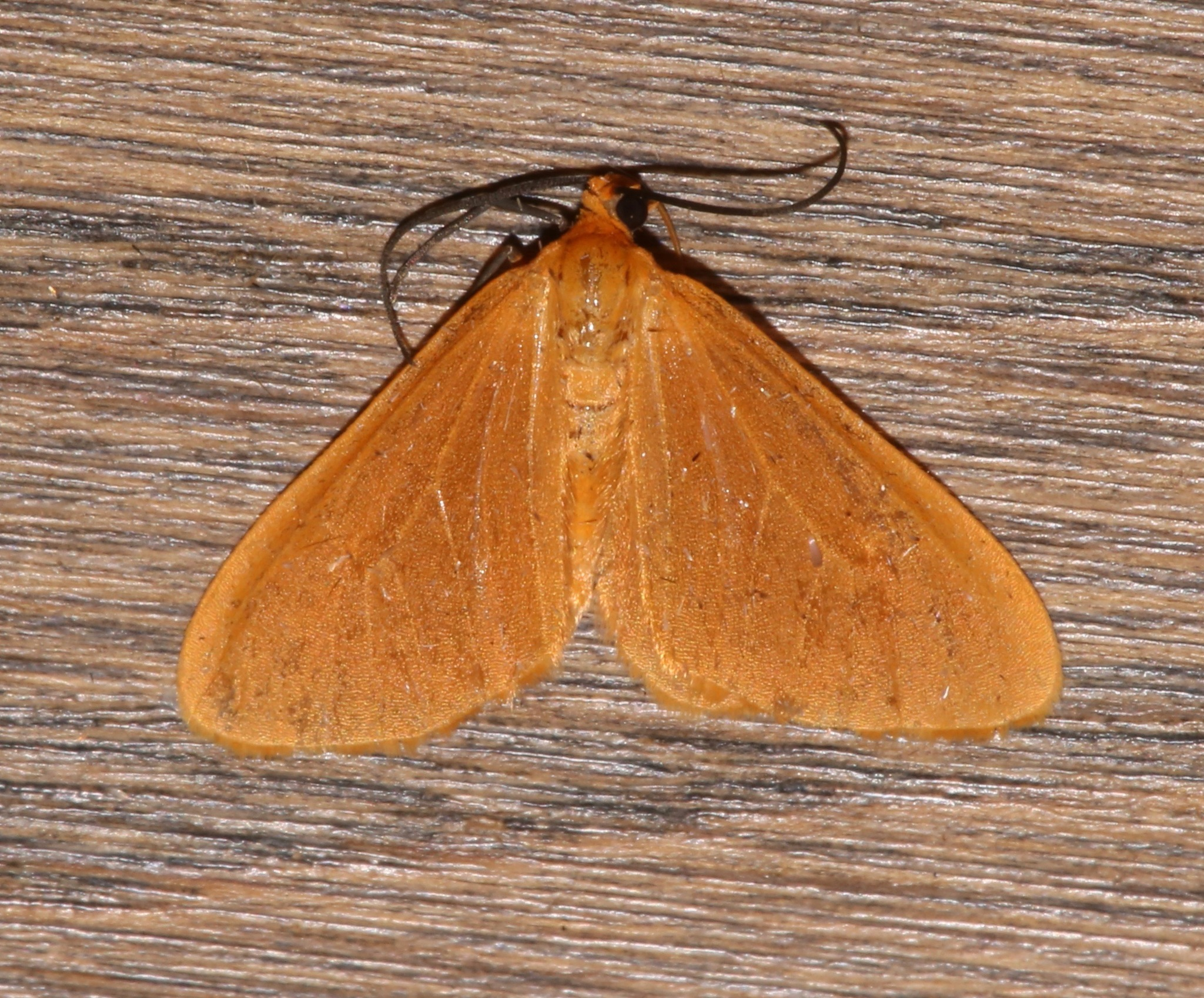
- Eubaphe unicolor

Scientific classification
- Domain: Eukaryota
- Kingdom: Animalia
- Phylum: Arthropoda
- Class: Insecta
- Order: Lepidoptera
- Family: Geometridae
- Tribe: Eudulini
- Genus: Eubaphe
- Species: E. unicolor

Binomial name
- Eubaphe unicolor (Robinson, 1869)

= Eubaphe unicolor =

Species of moth

Eubaphe unicolor is a species of geometrid moth in the family Geometridae. It is found throughout North America to South America.

The MONA or Hodges number for Eubaphe unicolor is 7444.

== Subspecies ==
These two subspecies belong to the species Eubaphe unicolor:

- Eubaphe unicolor unicolor
- Eubaphe unicolor venustata Fletcher, 1954
