= Mesastrape =

Scientific classification
- Kingdom: Animalia
- Phylum: Arthropoda
- Class: Insecta
- Order: Lepidoptera
- Family: Geometridae
- Tribe: Boarmiini
- Genus: Mesastrape; Warren, 1894

Genus of moths

Mesastrape is a genus of moth in the family Geometridae. It was formerly considered a synonym of Erebomorpha.

== Selected species ==
- Mesastrape fulguraria (Walker, 1860)
