= Eubaphe medea =

Scientific classification
- Kingdom: Animalia
- Phylum: Arthropoda
- Clade: Pancrustacea
- Class: Insecta
- Order: Lepidoptera
- Family: Geometridae
- Tribe: Eudulini
- Genus: Eubaphe
- Species: E. medea

Binomial name
- Eubaphe medea (Druce, 1885)

Species of moth

Eubaphe medea is a species of geometrid moth in the family Geometridae. It is found in Central America and North America.
