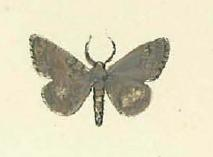

Scientific classification
- Domain: Eukaryota
- Kingdom: Animalia
- Phylum: Arthropoda
- Class: Insecta
- Order: Lepidoptera
- Family: Geometridae
- Genus: Eumannia
- Species: E. oppositaria

Binomial name
- Eumannia oppositaria (Mann, 1864)

Synonyms
- Tephronia oppositaria Mann, 1864; Mannia oppositaria syriaca Turati & Kruger, 1936

= Eumannia oppositaria =

Species of moth

Eumannia oppositaria, the bordered dusky carpet, is a moth of the family Geometridae. It is found in Slovenia, Ukraine, Romania, Bulgaria, North Macedonia, Albania, Greece and Turkey. It has also been recorded from Israel and North Africa.

The wingspan is 17–19 mm. Adults are on wing in July and August.

The larvae feed on Quercus, Crataegus and Prunus species.

== Subspecies ==
- Eumannia oppositaria oppositaria
- Eumannia oppositaria syriaca (Turati & Kruger, 1936) (Libya)
