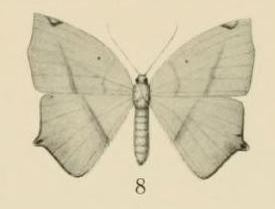

Scientific classification
- Kingdom: Animalia
- Phylum: Arthropoda
- Class: Insecta
- Order: Lepidoptera
- Family: Geometridae
- Genus: Epigynopteryx
- Species: E. africana

Binomial name
- Epigynopteryx africana (Aurivillius, 1910)

Synonyms
- Thinopteryx africana Aurivillius, 1910

= Epigynopteryx africana =

Species of moth

Epigynopteryx africana is a moth of the family Geometridae. It is found in Tanzania.
