= Mesoptila unitaeniata =

Scientific classification
- Kingdom: Animalia
- Phylum: Arthropoda
- Class: Insecta
- Order: Lepidoptera
- Family: Geometridae
- Genus: Mesoptila
- Species: M. unitaeniata

Binomial name
- Mesoptila unitaeniata (Warren, 1906)

Synonyms
- Ochyria unitaeniata Warren, 1906; Eupithecia unitaeniata

Species of moth

Mesoptila unitaeniata is a moth in the family Geometridae first described by William Warren in 1906. It is found in New Guinea.
