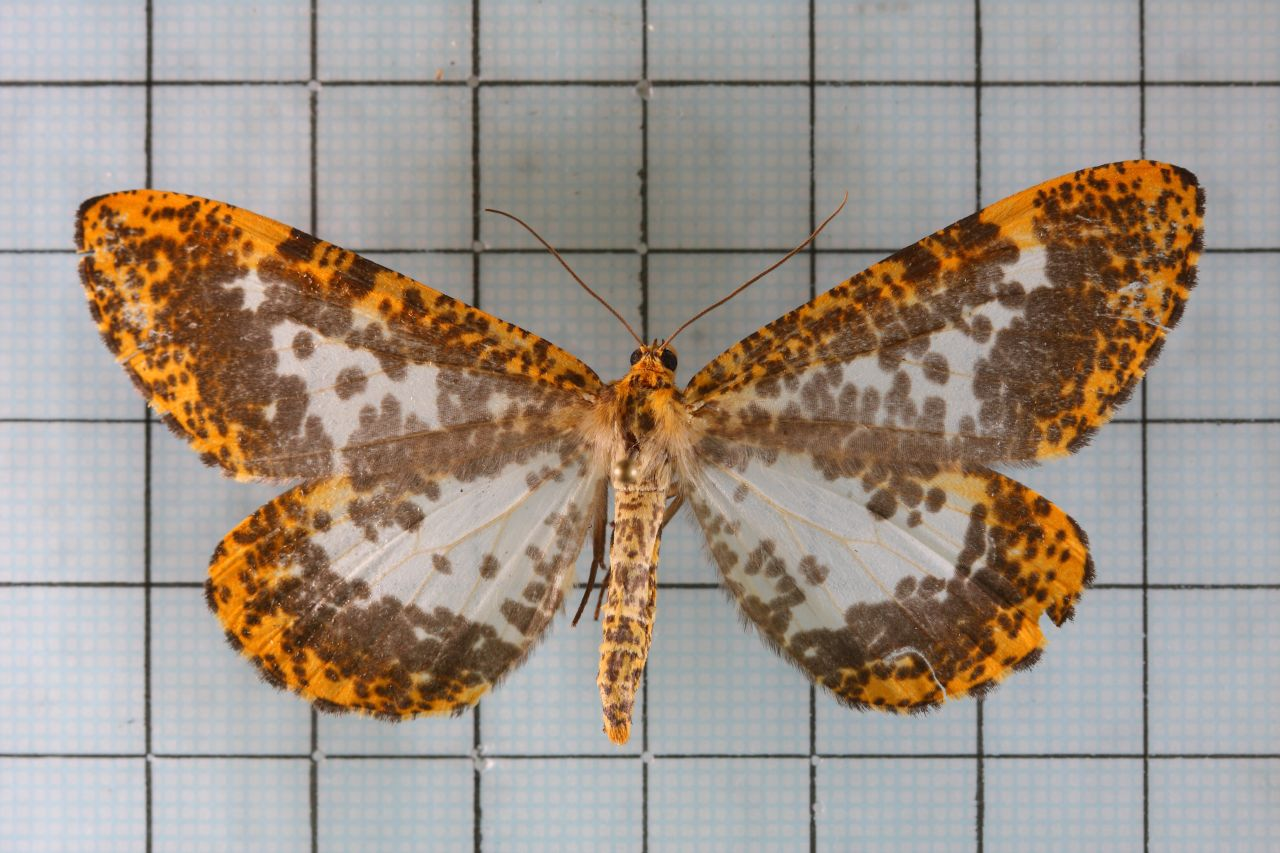
- Obeidia lucifera extranigricans
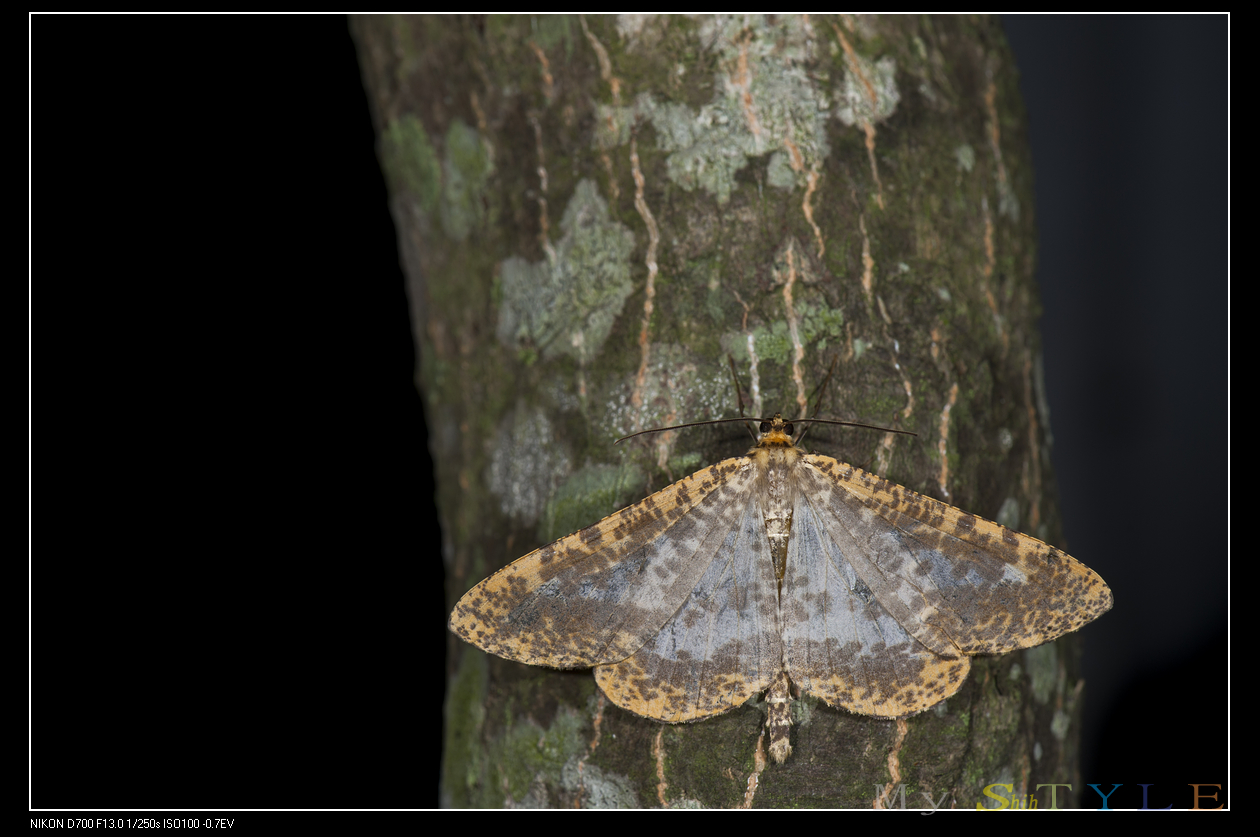

Scientific classification
- Kingdom: Animalia
- Phylum: Arthropoda
- Class: Insecta
- Order: Lepidoptera
- Family: Geometridae
- Genus: Obeidia
- Species: O. lucifera

Binomial name
- Obeidia lucifera C. Swinhoe, 1893

Synonyms
- Obeidia libellulalis Warren, 1893; Obeidia tigridata Thierry-Mieg, 1899

= Obeidia lucifera =

Species of moth

Obeidia lucifera is a moth of the family Geometridae first described by Charles Swinhoe in 1893. It is found in Taiwan, India, China and Nepal.

== Subspecies ==
- Obeidia lucifera lucifera
- Obeidia lucifera conspurcata Leech, 1897
- Obeidia lucifera decipiens Thierry-Mieg, 1899
- Obeidia lucifera extranigricans Wehrli, 1933 (Taiwan)
- Obeidia lucifera semifumosa Prout, 1925
