= Epigynopteryx maeviaria =

Scientific classification
- Kingdom: Animalia
- Phylum: Arthropoda
- Class: Insecta
- Order: Lepidoptera
- Family: Geometridae
- Genus: Epigynopteryx
- Species: E. maeviaria

Binomial name
- Epigynopteryx maeviaria (Guenée, 1858))

Synonyms
- Aspilates maevaria Guenée, 1858; Paracrocota triseriata Bastelberger, 1907

Species of moth

Epigynopteryx maeviaria is a moth of the family Geometridae. It is found in subtropical Africa and is known from Angola, Congo, Kenya, Malawi, South Africa, Tanzania and Zimbabwe.

The basic colour of this species is dirty light ochreous-yellow, sprayed with black. Its wingspan is 27 millimetres (1.1 in) and they are crossed with a large brown stripe.

== Subspecies ==
- Epigynopteryx maeviaria maeviaria (Guenée, 1858) - from Congo and South Africa
- Epigynopteryx maeviaria triseriata (Bastelberger, 1907) - from Kenya, Congo and Tanzania
