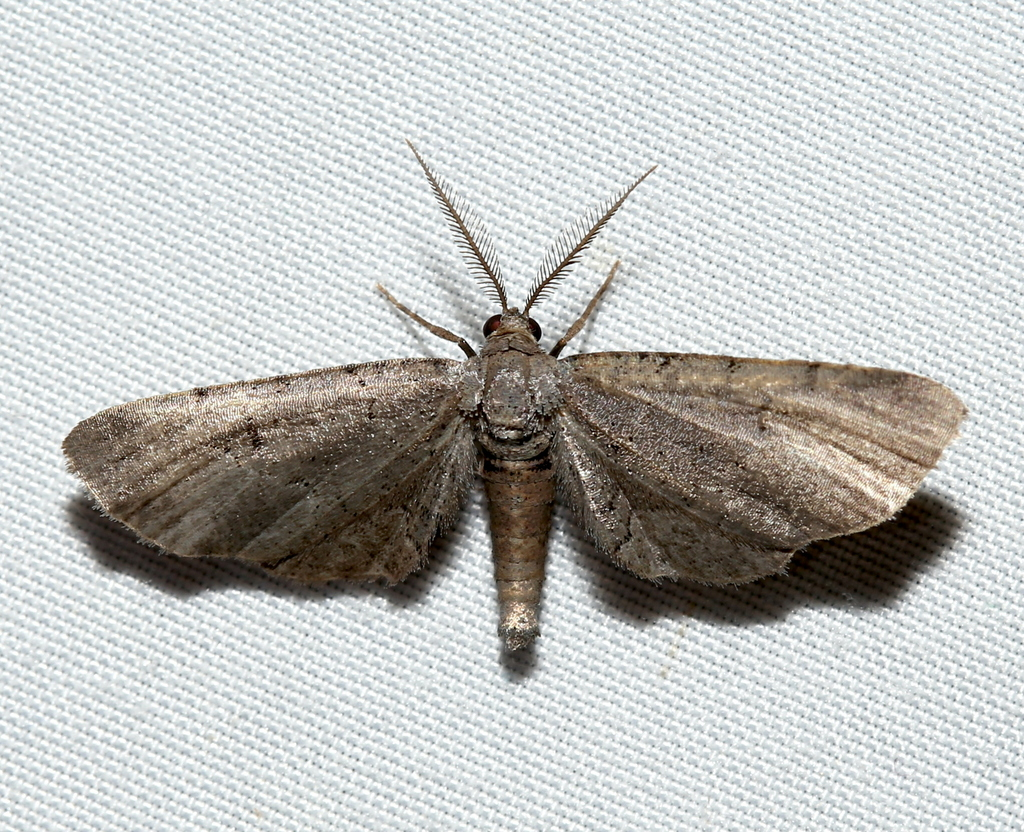

Scientific classification
- Kingdom: Animalia
- Phylum: Arthropoda
- Class: Insecta
- Order: Lepidoptera
- Family: Geometridae
- Genus: Exelis
- Species: E. pyrolaria

Binomial name
- Exelis pyrolaria Guenee, 1857

Synonyms
- Tornos approximaria Packard, 1876; Patridava tensaria Walker, 1863

= Exelis pyrolaria =

Species of moth

Exelis pyrolaria, the fine-lined gray moth or plumose gray moth, is a species of moth in the family Geometridae. It is found in North America, where it has been recorded east of the Mississippi River and south of Illinois and the District of Columbia.

The wingspan is 22–25 mm for males and 19–24 mm for females. Adults have been recorded on wing from February to September, with most records from May to August.

The larvae have been recorded feeding on Chimaphila umbellate and Diospyros virginiana.
