= Epigelasma rhodostigma =

Scientific classification
- Kingdom: Animalia
- Phylum: Arthropoda
- Class: Insecta
- Order: Lepidoptera
- Family: Geometridae
- Genus: Epigelasma
- Species: E. rhodostigma

Binomial name
- Epigelasma rhodostigma Herbulot, 1955

Species of moth

Epigelasma rhodostigma is a species of moth of the family Geometridae. It is found in East Madagascar.

The lengths of its forewings is 18mm. The upper side of its body is yellow-green, upperside of wings white largely mixed with yellow-green. The underside of the wings is white. It has one red cellular spot on the forewings and hindwings.

The holotype had been collected in East Madagascar in the valley of Faraony River, Vohilava.
