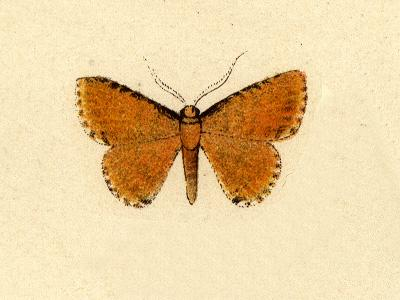

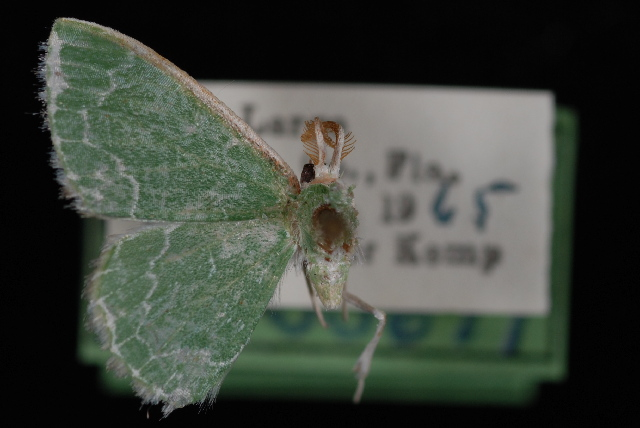

Scientific classification
- Domain: Eukaryota
- Kingdom: Animalia
- Phylum: Arthropoda
- Class: Insecta
- Order: Lepidoptera
- Family: Geometridae
- Genus: Eueana
- Species: E. niveociliaria

Binomial name
- Eueana niveociliaria (Herrich-Schäffer, 1870)

Synonyms
- Eucrostis niveociliaria Herrich-Schäffer, 1870; Eucrostis saltusaria Hulst, 1886; Eueana niveocilaria

= Eueana niveociliaria =

Species of moth

Eueana niveociliaria is a moth of the family Geometridae first described by Gottlieb August Wilhelm Herrich-Schäffer in 1870. It is found in the US state of Florida, as well as on the Bahamas, Cuba and Jamaica.

The wingspan is about 20 mm.

The larvae feed on Krugiodendron ferreum.
