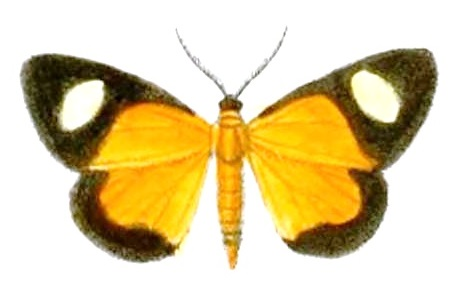

Scientific classification
- Kingdom: Animalia
- Phylum: Arthropoda
- Class: Insecta
- Order: Lepidoptera
- Family: Geometridae
- Genus: Emplocia
- Species: E. lassippa

Binomial name
- Emplocia lassippa (H. Druce, 1890)

Synonyms
- Devara lassippa H. Druce, 1890

= Emplocia lassippa =

Species of moth

Emplocia lassippa is a species of moth of the family Geometridae first described by Herbert Druce in 1890. It is found in Colombia.
