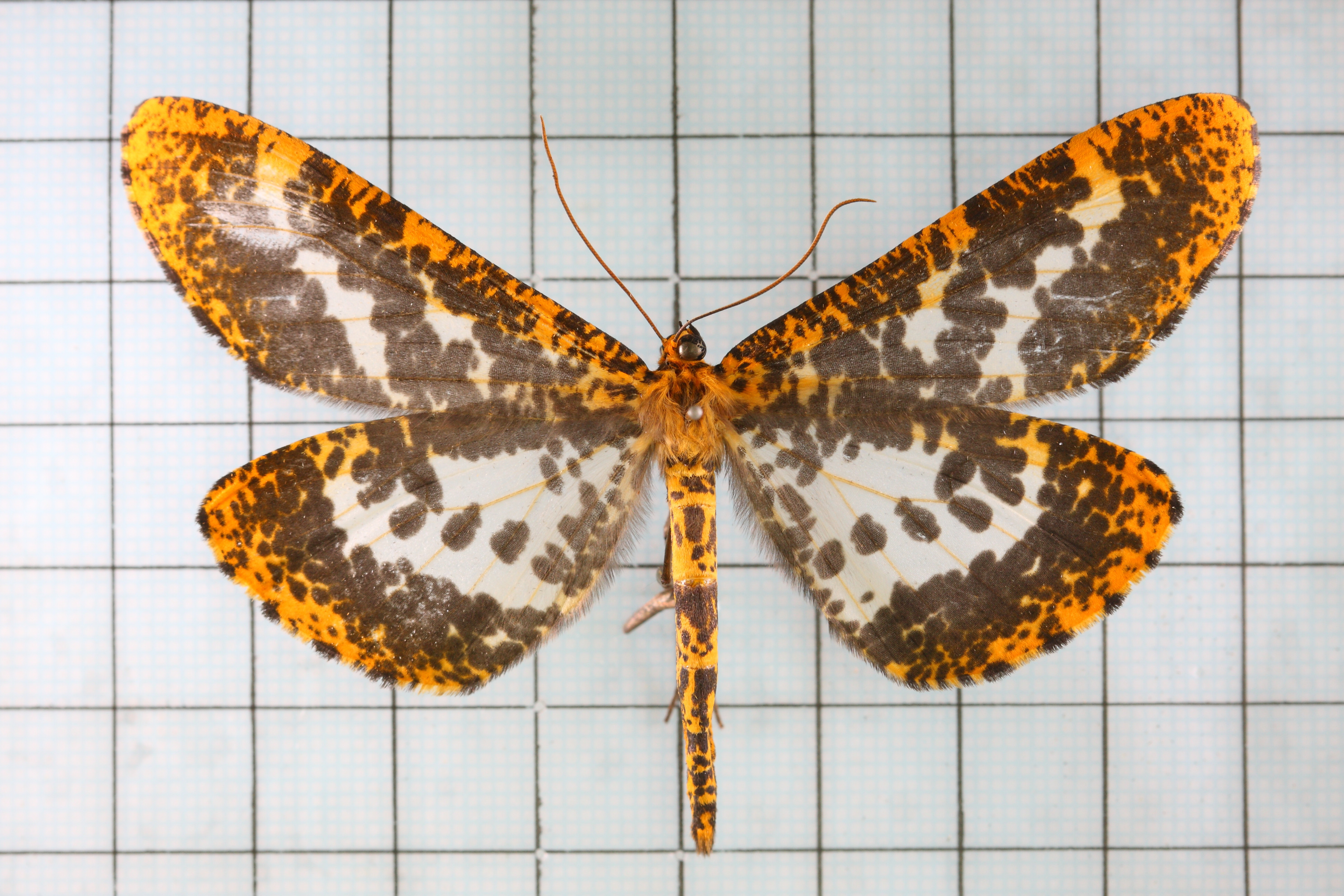
- Obeidia gigantearia marginifascia

Scientific classification
- Kingdom: Animalia
- Phylum: Arthropoda
- Class: Insecta
- Order: Lepidoptera
- Family: Geometridae
- Genus: Obeidia
- Species: O. gigantearia

Binomial name
- Obeidia gigantearia Leech, 1897

Synonyms
- Parobeidia gigantearia

= Obeidia gigantearia =

Species of moth

Obeidia gigantearia is a moth of the family Geometridae. It is found in Taiwan and China.

== Subspecies ==
- Obeidia gigantearia gigantearia
- Obeidia gigantearia longimacula Wehrli, 1939
- Obeidia gigantearia marginifascia Prout, 1914 (Taiwan)
