= Exelis ophiurus =

Scientific classification
- Domain: Eukaryota
- Kingdom: Animalia
- Phylum: Arthropoda
- Class: Insecta
- Order: Lepidoptera
- Family: Geometridae
- Tribe: Boarmiini
- Genus: Exelis
- Species: E. ophiurus

Binomial name
- Exelis ophiurus Rindge, 1952

Species of moth

Exelis ophiurus is a species of geometrid moth in the family Geometridae. It is found in North America.

The MONA or Hodges number for Exelis ophiurus is 6480.
