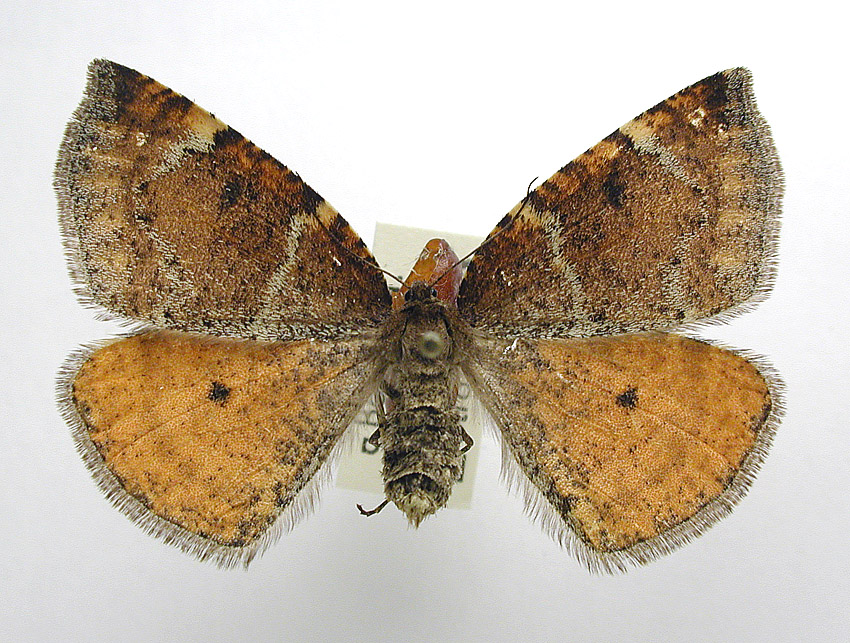
- Female
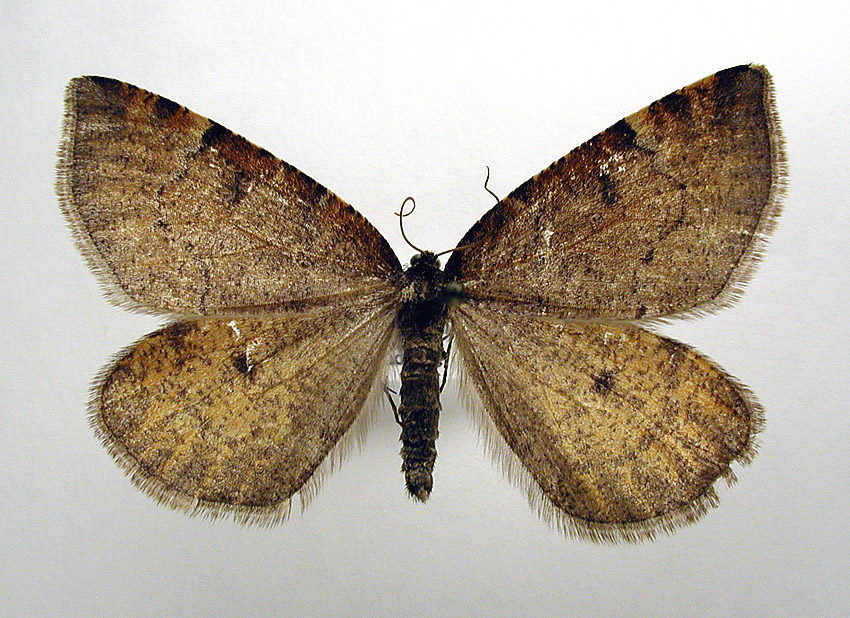
- Male

Scientific classification
- Domain: Eukaryota
- Kingdom: Animalia
- Phylum: Arthropoda
- Class: Insecta
- Order: Lepidoptera
- Family: Geometridae
- Genus: Epirranthis
- Species: E. diversata

Binomial name
- Epirranthis diversata (Denis & Schiffermüller, 1775)

= Epirranthis diversata =

Species of moth

Epirranthis diversata is a moth of the family Geometridae. The species was first described by Michael Denis and Ignaz Schiffermüller in 1775. It can be found from central and western Siberia and northern and central Russia to western Europe and from Scandinavia down to the Alps.

The wingspan is 31–45 mm. The moths flies from April to June depending on the location.

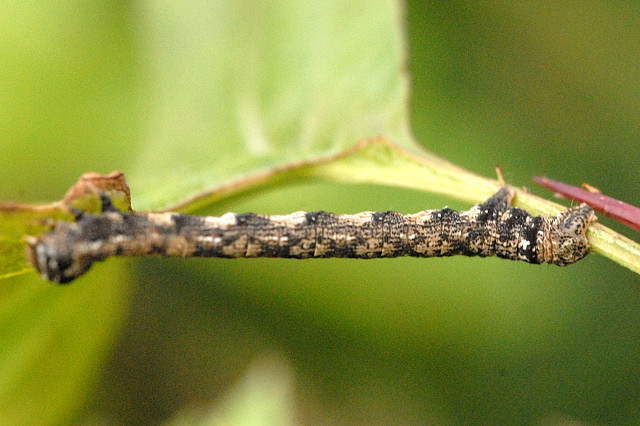
Caterpillar

The larvae feed on Populus tremula.
