= Mesoptila murcida =

Scientific classification
- Kingdom: Animalia
- Phylum: Arthropoda
- Clade: Pancrustacea
- Class: Insecta
- Order: Lepidoptera
- Family: Geometridae
- Genus: Mesoptila
- Species: M. murcida

Binomial name
- Mesoptila murcida Mironov & Galsworthy, 2012

Species of moth

Mesoptila murcida is a moth in the family Geometridae. It is found on Java. It inhabits montane areas.

The wingspan is about 17 millimetres (0.67 in) for males.
