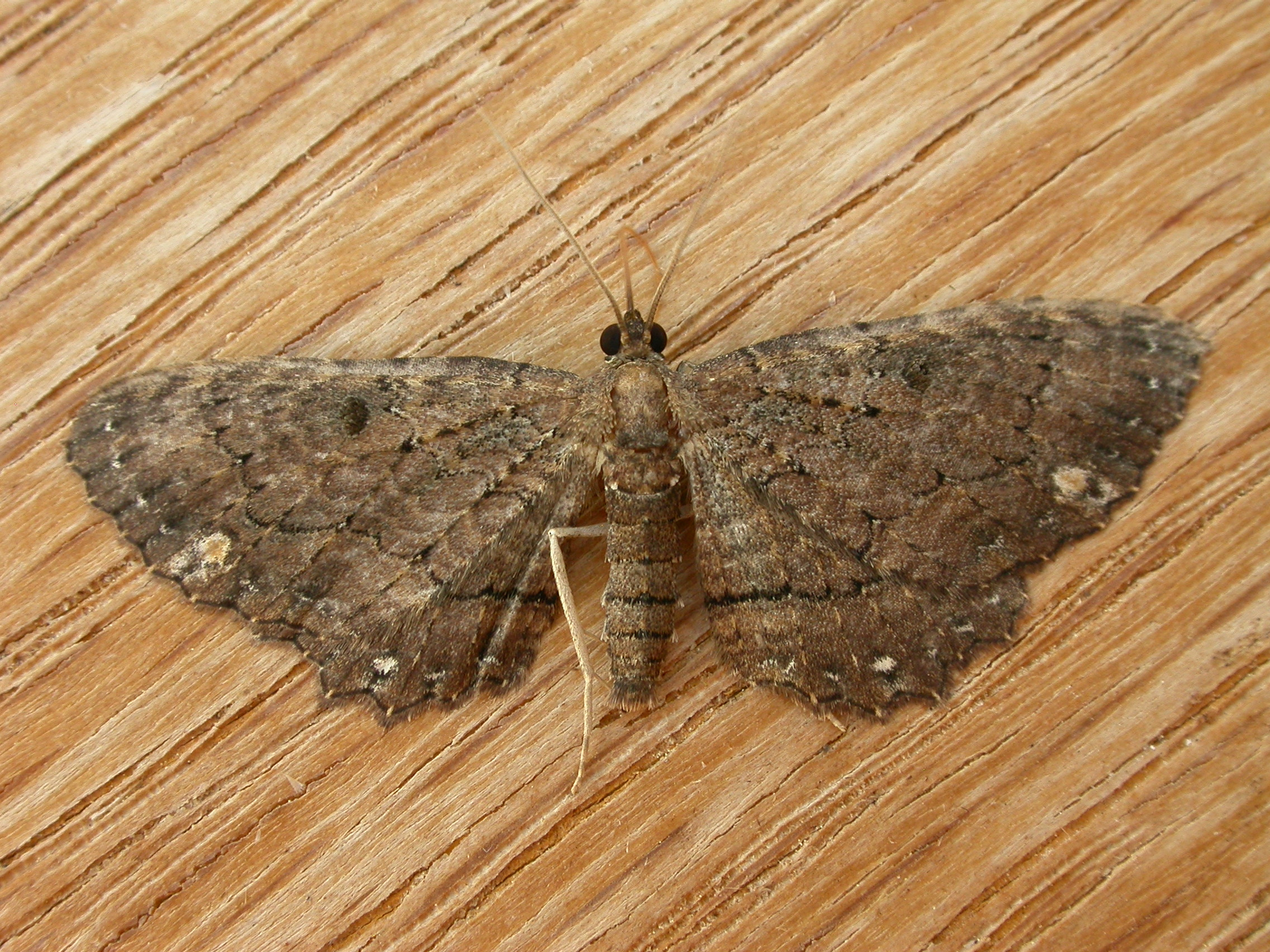

Scientific classification
- Kingdom: Animalia
- Phylum: Arthropoda
- Clade: Pancrustacea
- Class: Insecta
- Order: Lepidoptera
- Family: Geometridae
- Genus: Eccymatoge
- Species: E. fulvida

Binomial name
- Eccymatoge fulvida (Turner, 1907)

Synonyms
- Eucymatoge fulvida Turner, 1907

= Eccymatoge fulvida =

Species of moth

Eccymatoge fulvida is a moth of the family Geometridae. It was first described by Alfred Jefferis Turner in 1907. It is known from Australia.
