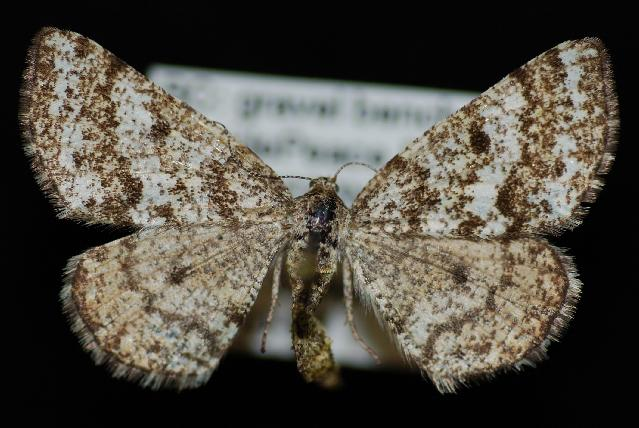

Scientific classification
- Kingdom: Animalia
- Phylum: Arthropoda
- Class: Insecta
- Order: Lepidoptera
- Family: Geometridae
- Tribe: Melanolophiini
- Genus: Eufidonia
- Species: E. discospilata

Binomial name
- Eufidonia discospilata (Walker, 1862)

= Eufidonia discospilata =

Species of moth

Eufidonia discospilata, the sharp-lined powder moth, is a species of geometrid moth in the family Geometridae. It is found in North America.

The MONA or Hodges number for Eufidonia discospilata is 6639.
