= Mesoptila compsodes =

Scientific classification
- Kingdom: Animalia
- Phylum: Arthropoda
- Class: Insecta
- Order: Lepidoptera
- Family: Geometridae
- Genus: Mesoptila
- Species: M. compsodes

Binomial name
- Mesoptila compsodes Meyrick, 1891

Species of moth

Mesoptila compsodes is a moth in the family Geometridae first described by Edward Meyrick in 1891. It is found in Australia. Mesoptila compsodes is the type species of the genus Mesoptila.

== Description ==
The following is paraphrased from the original species description:

The wingspan of the female is 17 mm. Most of the body is pale ochreous, but the abdomen has dense black spots. The legs are whitish ochreous with the forelegs partially darkened.

The forewings are elongate and triangular with the costa moderately arched posteriorly and the hind margin bowed and waved. The colour is light reddish-ochreous with many whitish-ochreous, curved, transverse lines (some of these partially marked with black). There is a tuft of erect blackish scales in the middle of the disc and a small triangular blackish mark on the costa at two-thirds of its length.

The hindwings have nearly straight hind margins that are crenulate. They are fuscous-whitish in colour and marked with incomplete reddish-ochreous lines sprinkled with black.

All wings have an interrupted blackish line among the hind margin, and ochreous-whitish cilia that are somewhat sprinkled with black.
