= Mesoptila festiva =

Scientific classification
- Kingdom: Animalia
- Phylum: Arthropoda
- Clade: Pancrustacea
- Class: Insecta
- Order: Lepidoptera
- Family: Geometridae
- Genus: Mesoptila
- Species: M. festiva

Binomial name
- Mesoptila festiva (L. B. Prout, 1916)

Synonyms
- Eupithecia festiva Prout, 1916

Species of moth

Mesoptila festiva is a moth in the family Geometridae. It is found in South Africa.
