= Mesoptila excita =

Scientific classification
- Kingdom: Animalia
- Phylum: Arthropoda
- Clade: Pancrustacea
- Class: Insecta
- Order: Lepidoptera
- Family: Geometridae
- Genus: Mesoptila
- Species: M. excita

Binomial name
- Mesoptila excita (Prout, 1958)

Synonyms
- Eupithecia excita Prout, 1958

Species of moth

Mesoptila excita is a moth in the family Geometridae. It is found on Sulawesi.
