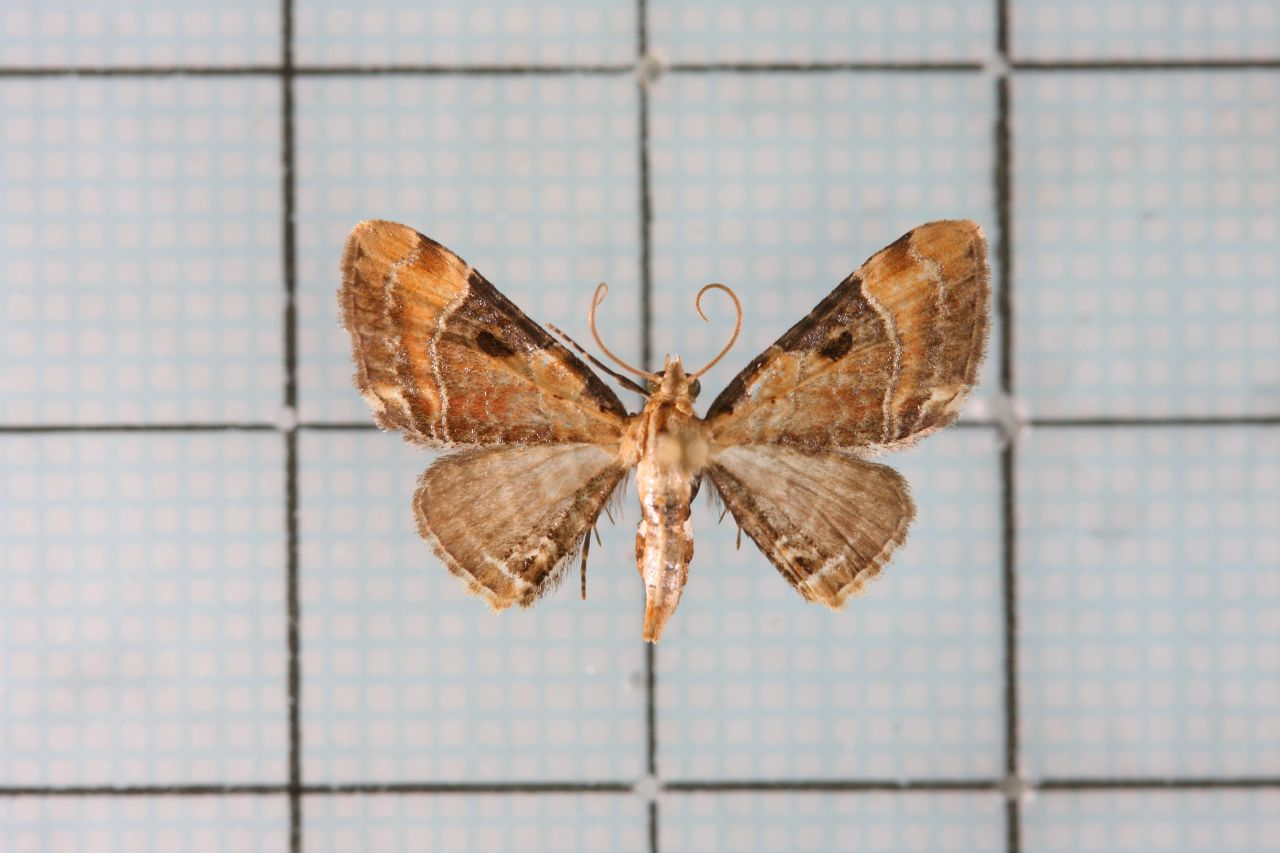

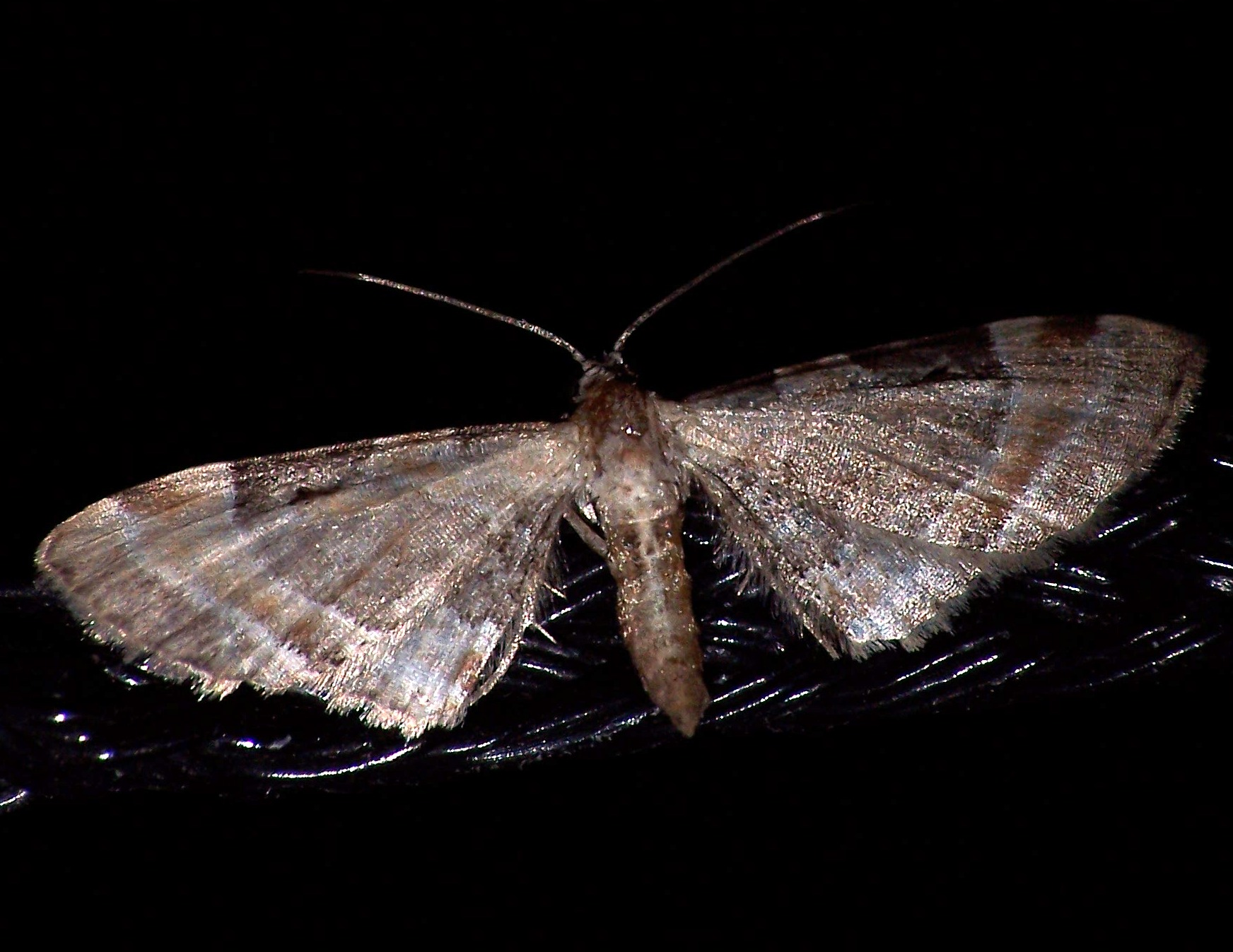

Scientific classification
- Domain: Eukaryota
- Kingdom: Animalia
- Phylum: Arthropoda
- Class: Insecta
- Order: Lepidoptera
- Family: Geometridae
- Genus: Mesoptila
- Species: M. melanolopha

Binomial name
- Mesoptila melanolopha (C. Swinhoe, 1895)

Synonyms
- Eupithecia melanolopha C. Swinhoe, 1895; Tephroclystia melanolopha; Eupithecia owadai Vojnits, 1988

= Mesoptila melanolopha =

Species of moth

Mesoptila melanolopha is a moth in the family Geometridae first described by Charles Swinhoe in 1895. It is found in Nepal, China (Shaanxi, Jiangsu, Hunan), Korea, Japan, Taiwan, India (Sikkim, Meghalaya), Sri Lanka, Thailand, Vietnam, Malaysia and on Java, Bali and Borneo.

The wingspan is 16–21 mm.

The larvae have been recorded feeding Stephania species.
