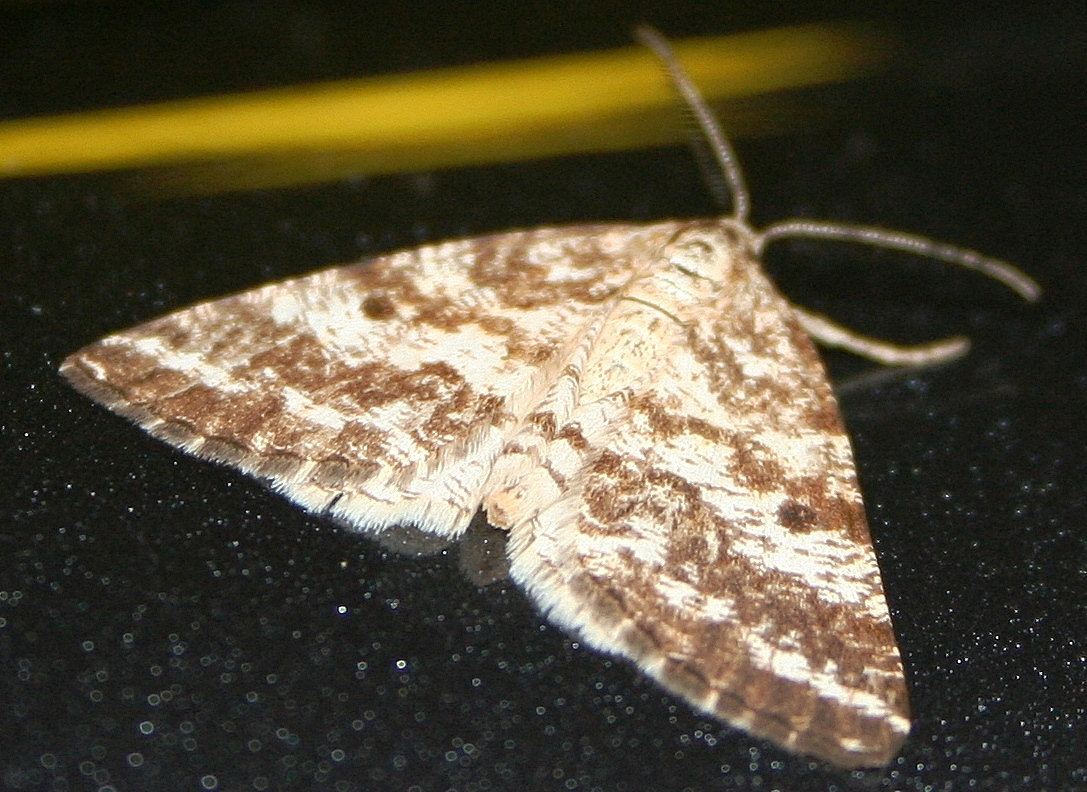

Scientific classification
- Kingdom: Animalia
- Phylum: Arthropoda
- Class: Insecta
- Order: Lepidoptera
- Family: Geometridae
- Genus: Eufidonia
- Species: E. convergaria

Binomial name
- Eufidonia convergaria (Walker, 1860)

Synonyms
- Boarmia convergaria Walker, 1860; Lozogramma famulata Hulst, 1887

= Eufidonia convergaria =

Species of moth

Eufidonia convergaria, the pine powder moth or converged powder moth, is a species of moth of the family Geometridae. It is found from Newfoundland to British Columbia and the northwestern parts of the United States.

The wingspan is 22–30 mm. The moth flies from May to July depending on the location.

The larvae feed on Pinus species, including white pine, lodgepole pine, and jack pine.
