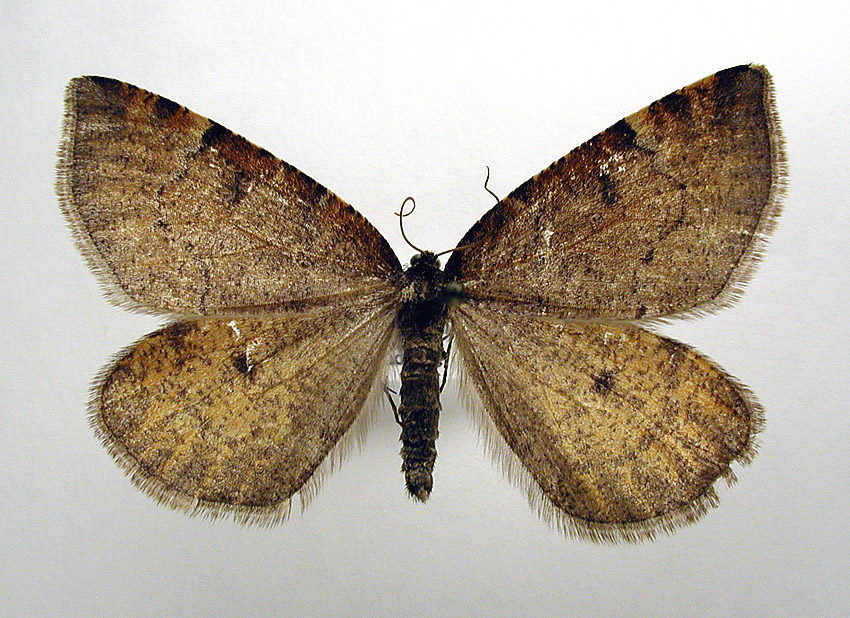
- Epirranthis diversata

Scientific classification
- Kingdom: Animalia
- Phylum: Arthropoda
- Clade: Pancrustacea
- Class: Insecta
- Order: Lepidoptera
- Family: Geometridae
- Subfamily: Oenochrominae
- Genus: Epirranthis; Hübner, [1823]

= Epirranthis =

Genus of moths

Epirranthis is a genus of moths in the family Geometridae erected by Jacob Hübner in 1823.

== Species ==
- Epirranthis diversata (Denis & Schiffermüller, 1775)
- Epirranthis substriataria (Hulst, 1896)
