= Mesoptila deviridata =

Scientific classification
- Kingdom: Animalia
- Phylum: Arthropoda
- Class: Insecta
- Order: Lepidoptera
- Family: Geometridae
- Genus: Mesoptila
- Species: M. deviridata

Binomial name
- Mesoptila deviridata (Warren, 1907)

Synonyms
- Emmesocoma deviridata Warren, 1907; Eupithecia deviridata

Species of moth

Mesoptila deviridata is a species of moth in the family Geometridae. It was first described by William Warren in 1907. The species is found in New Guinea.
