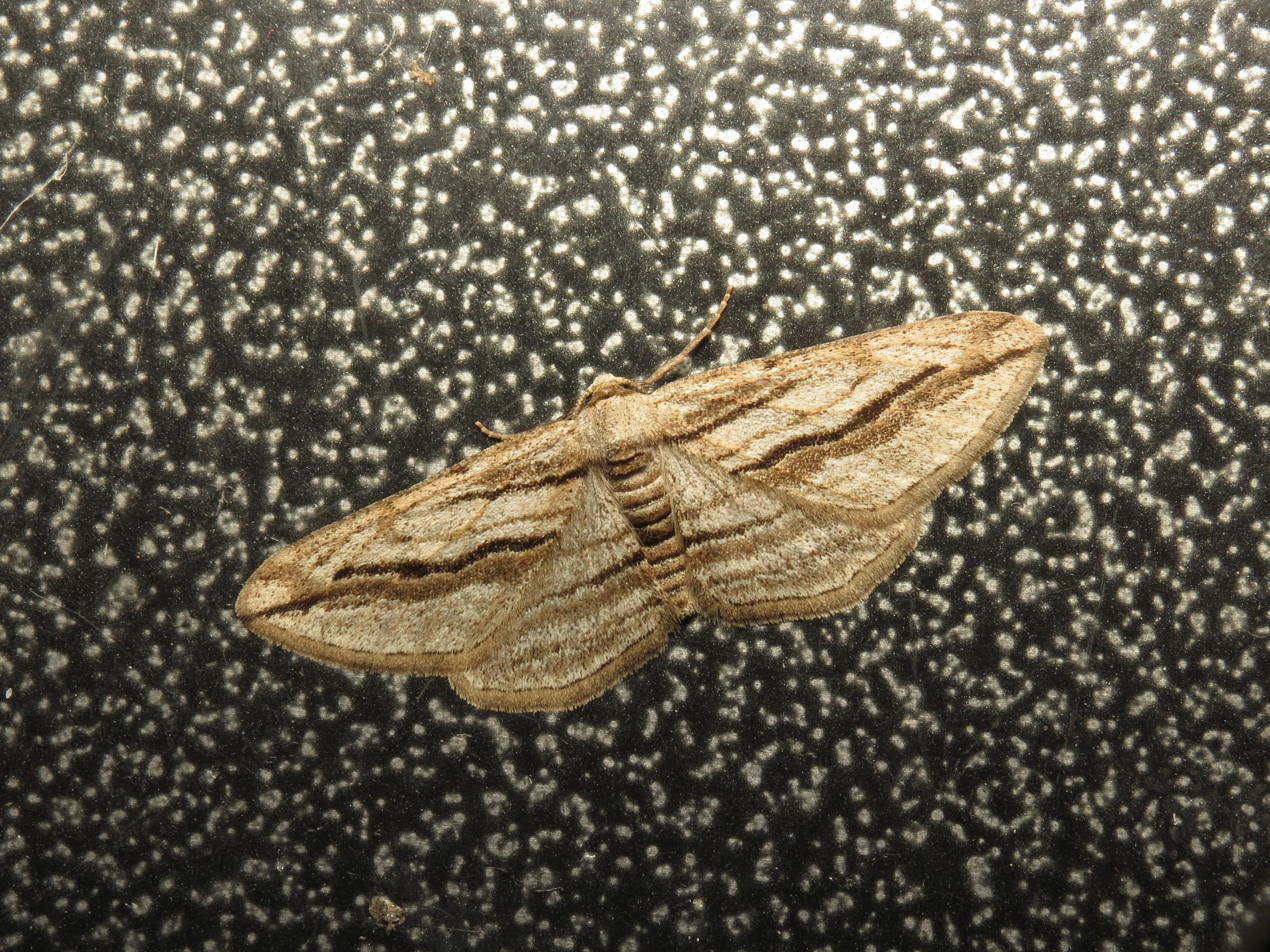

Scientific classification
- Domain: Eukaryota
- Kingdom: Animalia
- Phylum: Arthropoda
- Class: Insecta
- Order: Lepidoptera
- Family: Geometridae
- Genus: Ecleora
- Species: E. solieraria

Binomial name
- Ecleora solieraria (Rambur, 1834)

Synonyms
- Boarmia solieraria Rambur, 1834; Boarmia nana Fernandez, 1933

= Ecleora solieraria =

Species of moth

Ecleora solieraria is a moth in the family Geometridae. It is found in France, Andorra and Spain.

The wingspan is about 30 mm.

The larvae feed on Cupressus and Juniperus species.
