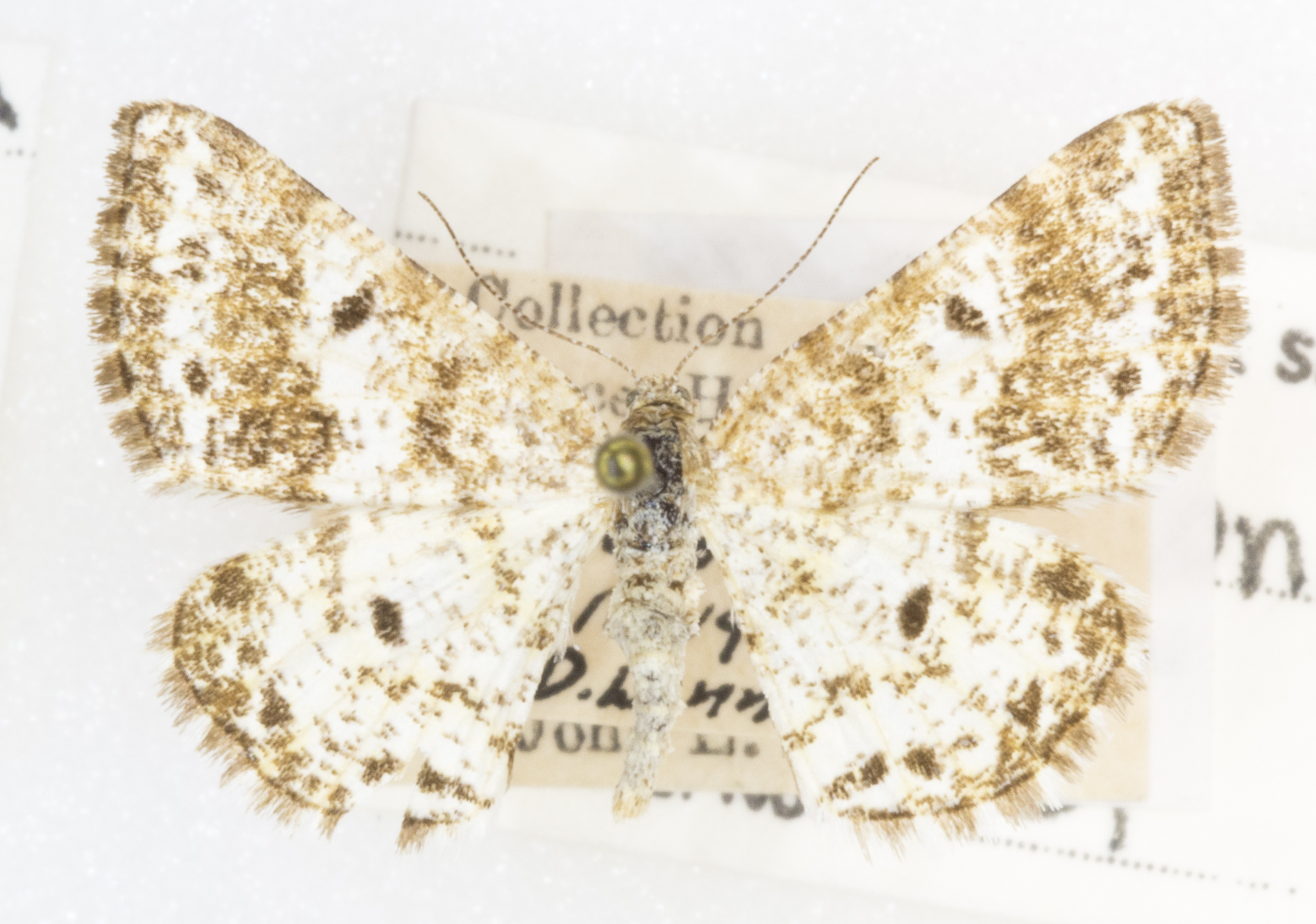

Scientific classification
- Kingdom: Animalia
- Phylum: Arthropoda
- Class: Insecta
- Order: Lepidoptera
- Family: Geometridae
- Genus: Eufidonia
- Species: E. notataria

Binomial name
- Eufidonia notataria (Walker, 1860)

Synonyms
- Tephrosia notataria Walker, 1860

= Eufidonia notataria =

Species of moth

Eufidonia notataria, the powder moth, is a species of moth in the family Geometridae. It is found in north-eastern North America.

The wingspan is 22–27 mm. Adults are on wing from May to July. There is one generation per year.

The larvae feed on balsam fir, eastern hemlock, eastern larch and spruces.
