= Epigelasma crenifera =

Scientific classification
- Kingdom: Animalia
- Phylum: Arthropoda
- Class: Insecta
- Order: Lepidoptera
- Family: Geometridae
- Genus: Epigelasma
- Species: E. crenifera

Binomial name
- Epigelasma crenifera Herbulot, 1970

Species of moth

Epigelasma crenifera is a species of moth of the family Geometridae. It is found in North Madagascar.

The antennae of both sexes are bipectinated over 3/4 of its length. The upper side of the body is green-blue, the underside of the body and legs are white, with a reddish front side for the first pair of legs. The length of the forewings is 14 mm, the upper side of the wings is blueish-green, the underside is white.
