= Epigynopteryx glycera =

Scientific classification
- Kingdom: Animalia
- Phylum: Arthropoda
- Clade: Pancrustacea
- Class: Insecta
- Order: Lepidoptera
- Family: Geometridae
- Genus: Epigynopteryx
- Species: E. glycera

Binomial name
- Epigynopteryx glycera Prout, 1934

Species of moth

Epigynopteryx glycera is a moth of the family Geometridae. It is found in Madagascar.

This is a little, elegant species with a wingspan of 31–32 mm with very few irrorations.

== Subspecies ==
- Epigynopteryx glycera glycera Prout, 1934
- Epigynopteryx glycera subbasalis Herbulot, 1965
