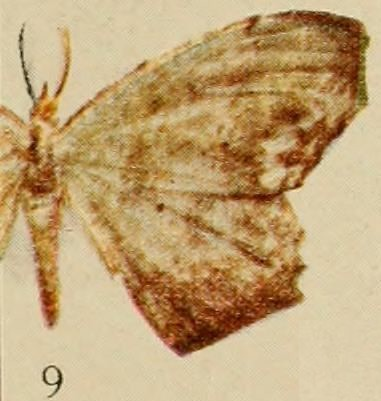

Scientific classification
- Domain: Eukaryota
- Kingdom: Animalia
- Phylum: Arthropoda
- Class: Insecta
- Order: Lepidoptera
- Family: Geometridae
- Genus: Epigynopteryx
- Species: E. langaria

Binomial name
- Epigynopteryx langaria (Holland, 1920)

Synonyms
- Gonanticlea langaria Holland, 1920

= Epigynopteryx langaria =

Species of moth

Epigynopteryx langaria is a moth of the family Geometridae. It is found in Congo.
