= Eubaphe helveta =

Scientific classification
- Kingdom: Animalia
- Phylum: Arthropoda
- Class: Insecta
- Order: Lepidoptera
- Family: Geometridae
- Genus: Eubaphe
- Species: E. helveta

Binomial name
- Eubaphe helveta (Barnes, 1907)

Species of moth

Eubaphe helveta is a species of moth in the family Geometridae first described by William Barnes in 1907. It is found in North America.

The MONA or Hodges number for Eubaphe helveta is 7442.
