= Epitherina =

Scientific classification
- Kingdom: Animalia
- Phylum: Arthropoda
- Class: Insecta
- Order: Lepidoptera
- Family: Geometridae
- Genus: Epitherina; Wehrli, 1938
- Species: E. kusnetzovi

Binomial name
- Epitherina kusnetzovi Viidalepp, 1992

Genus of moths

Epitherina is a monotypic moth genus in the family Geometridae described by Eugen Wehrli in 1938. Its only species, Epitherina kusnetzovi, was described by Jaan Viidalepp in 1992.
