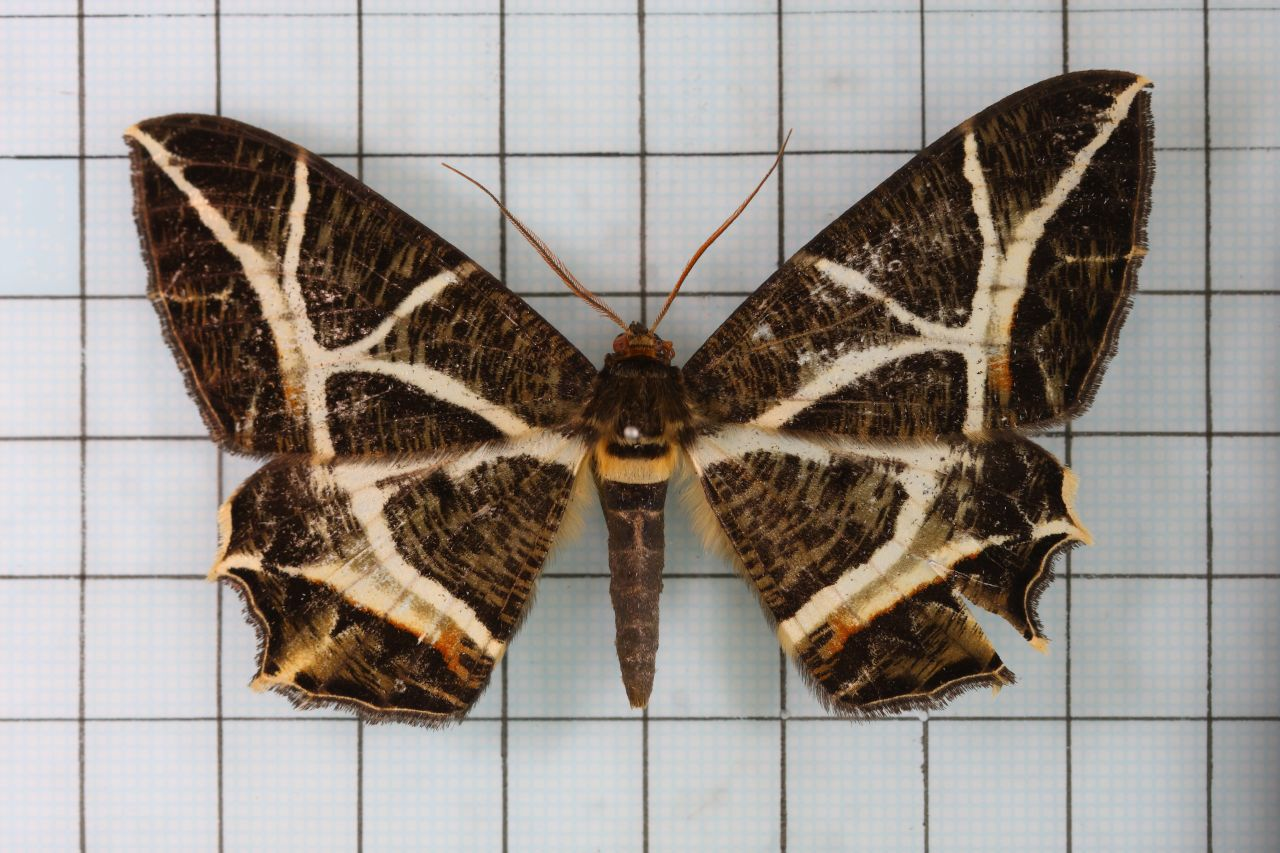

Scientific classification
- Kingdom: Animalia
- Phylum: Arthropoda
- Class: Insecta
- Order: Lepidoptera
- Family: Geometridae
- Genus: Mesastrape
- Species: M. fulguraria

Binomial name
- Mesastrape fulguraria (Walker, 1860)

Synonyms
- Erebomorpha fulguraria Walker, 1860; Erebomorpha xanthosoma Felder & Rogenhofer, 1875; Erebomorpha consors Butler, 1878; Erebomorpha intervolans Wehrli 1941

= Mesastrape fulguraria =

Species of moth

Mesastrape fulguraria is a moth in the family Geometridae. It is found in Japan, Taiwan and China.

The wingspan is 60–65 mm.

== Subspecies ==
- Mesastrape fulguraria fulguraria
- Mesastrape fulguraria consors Butler, 1878 (Japan)
- Mesastrape fulguraria intervolans Wehrli, 1941 (China)
