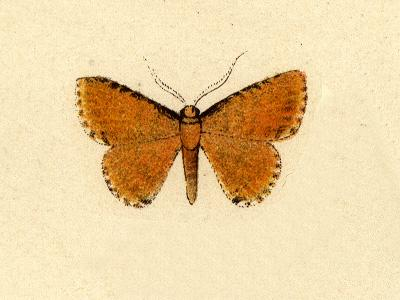
- Eueana niveociliaria

Scientific classification
- Kingdom: Animalia
- Phylum: Arthropoda
- Clade: Pancrustacea
- Class: Insecta
- Order: Lepidoptera
- Family: Geometridae
- Subfamily: Geometrinae
- Genus: Eueana; Prout, 1912

= Eueana =

Genus of moths

Eueana is a genus of moths in the family Geometridae first described by Prout in 1912.

== Species ==
- Eueana niveociliaria (Herrich-Schäffer, 1870)
- Eueana simplaria Herbulot, 1986
