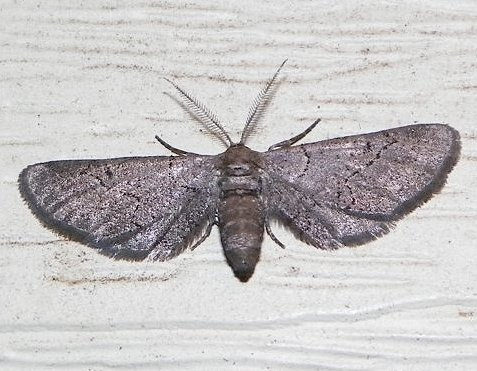
- Exelis pyrolaria

Scientific classification
- Kingdom: Animalia
- Phylum: Arthropoda
- Clade: Pancrustacea
- Class: Insecta
- Order: Lepidoptera
- Family: Geometridae
- Tribe: Boarmiini
- Genus: Exelis; Guenee, 1857

Synonyms
- Patridava Walker, 1863

= Exelis =

Genus of moths

Exelis is a genus of moths in the family Geometridae erected by Achille Guenée in 1857.

== Species ==
- Exelis dicolus Rindge, 1952
- Exelis mundaria Dyar, 1916
- Exelis ophiurus Rindge, 1952
- Exelis pyrolaria Guenee, 1857
