= Euphronarcha =

Scientific classification
- Kingdom: Animalia
- Phylum: Arthropoda
- Class: Insecta
- Order: Lepidoptera
- Family: Geometridae
- Tribe: Boarmiini
- Genus: Euphronarcha; Warren, 1898

Genus of moths

Euphronarcha is a genus of moths in the family Geometridae. The genus was described by Warren in 1898.

== Species ==
- Euphronarcha coundularia Bastelberger 1907
- Euphronarcha disperdita Walker 1860
- Euphronarcha epiphloea (Turner, 1926)
- Euphronarcha hemipteraria Guenée 1857
- Euphronarcha leptodesma (Meyrick, 1892)
- Euphronarcha luxaria (Guenée, 1857)
