= Eve of Alana =

German-Argentinian band

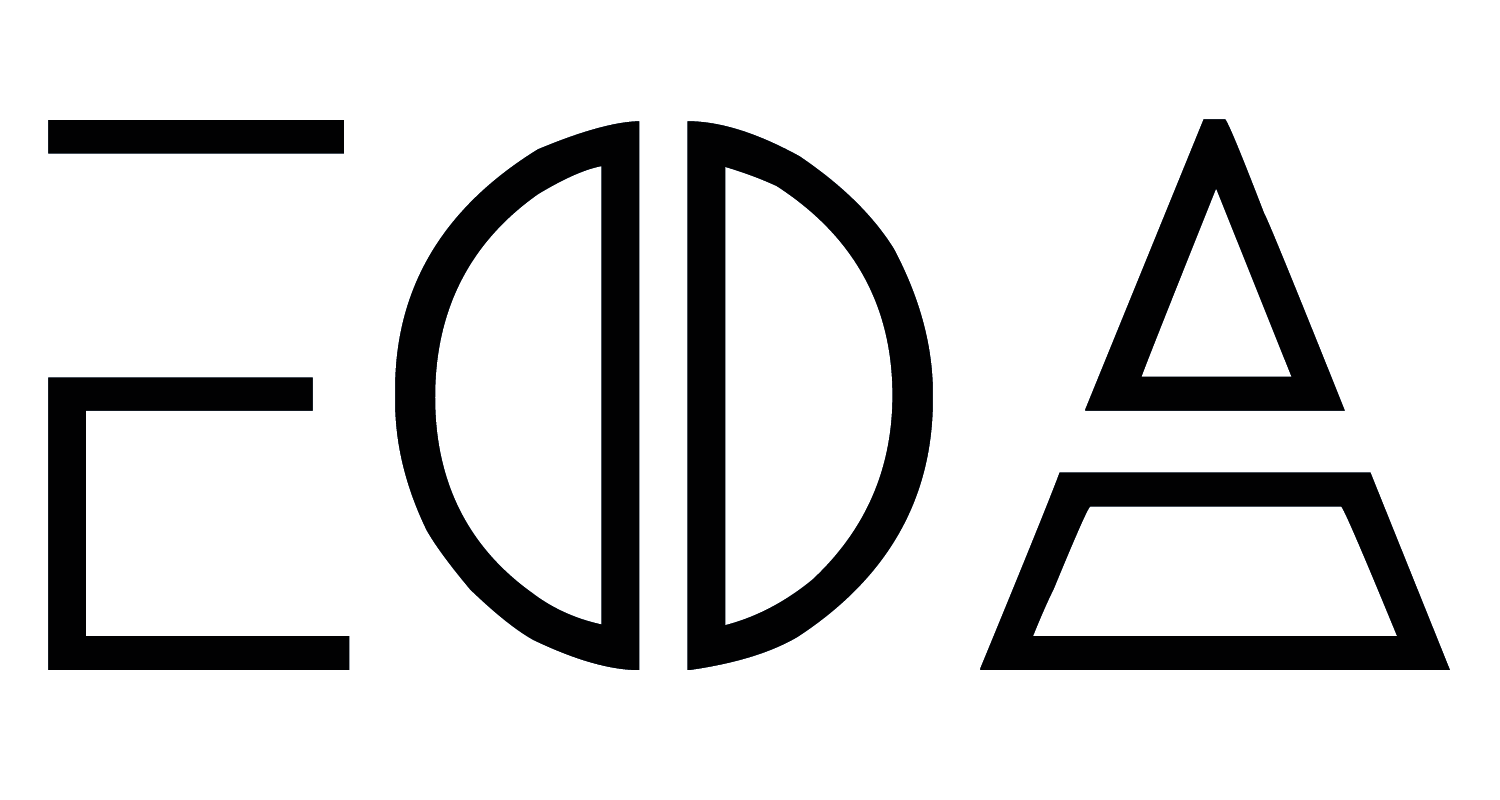

Background information
- Origin: Hamburg, Germany
- Genres: Djent, alternative metal
- Years active: 2017–present
- Members: Juan Gracia (g/voc); Lea Swetlana (dr); Kain Nod (bass)
- Website: eveofalana.com

Eve of Alana is a German-Argentinian alternative metal, nu metalcore and djent band from St. Pauli, Hamburg, Germany, formed in 2017.

== History ==
From 2009 to 2017 Kloth, Gracia and Nod, had been working with guitarist/bassist Roman Karius in a former outfit called Trailer Park Sex. That year the band parted ways with Karius and decided to start over under a new name. From then on as a trio, the band moved away from 'Trailer Park Sex's early styles of music (Mathcore & Metalcore) towards a crossover between Alternative Metal, Nu Metalcore and Djent.

Eve of Alana proceeded to release their debut album 'Inviolable Distance' which was soon followed by the release the music video for the first single of that record the song "Selfie Boy". Shortly after, the band went on to a headliner Spanish tour called 'Spanish Supernova Tour', visiting among other cities Barcelona, Valencia, Zaragoza and Madrid. In 2018 the band played only two concerts in Germany, one in their home city opening for Moldovan Nu Metalcore band Infected Rain and the "Four Seasons Festival" in Bavaria. In September of that year the music video for "Bystander" was released and shortly after the band embarked on the 'American Supernova Tour' in which they played Tijuana, Santee, Las Vegas and Los Angeles.

Early in 2019 Eve of Alana released the official music video for the song "The Attraction" which was shot at the legendary Whisky a Go Go in West Hollywood, California.

== Influences ==
The Band is known for having a distinct musical style consisting in a blend of many different genres, Nu Metal, Alternative Metal and Djent. On their official Facebook Page they cite an eclectic selection of influences ranging from classic and progressive rock to Alternative Metal and Djent (Deftones, Northlane, Hacktivist, Incubus, Erra, Pink Floyd, Monuments, Tool, Twelve Foot Ninja, Led Zeppelin and Silverchair).

== Band members ==
Current members

- Juan Gracia - guitars, vocals (2017–present)
- Lea Swetlana - drums (2017–present)
- Kain Nod - Bass (2017–present)

== Discography ==
Studio albums

- Inviolable Distance (2017, self-released)
- Before the Pandemic (2020, self-released)

EP's

- Nagareboshi 流れ星 (2024, Cult of Alana Records)

Splits

- "They Live", in: Brutal Vision Vol. 2 (Deafground Records - Nuvinci Records)
- "American Nightmare", in: Brutal Vision Vol. 3 (Noizgate Records - Nuvinci Records)

== Videography ==
- 2017: Selfie Boy
- 2018: Bystander
- 2019: The Attraction Live at the Whisky A Go Go
- 2020: Killer Pheromone
- 2020: Selfie Boy Live at the Whisky A Go Go
- 2021: Something that I'm not
