= Epigelasma =

Scientific classification
- Kingdom: Animalia
- Phylum: Arthropoda
- Clade: Pancrustacea
- Class: Insecta
- Order: Lepidoptera
- Family: Geometridae
- Subfamily: Geometrinae
- Genus: Epigelasma; Prout, 1930

Genus of moths

Epigelasma is a genus of moths in the family Geometridae described by Prout in 1930.

== Species ==
Some species of this genus are:

- Epigelasma alba Viette, 1970
- Epigelasma befasy Viette, 1981
- Epigelasma corrupta Herbulot, 1955
- Epigelasma crenifera Herbulot, 1970
- Epigelasma disjuncta Herbulot, 1972
- Epigelasma frigida Herbulot, 1972
- Epigelasma herbuloti Viette, 1980
- Epigelasma hispida Herbulot, 1972
- Epigelasma holochroa Herbulot, 1972
- Epigelasma lutea Viette, 1970
- Epigelasma meloui Prout, 1930
- Epigelasma nobilis Herbulot, 1955
- Epigelasma occidentalis Herbulot, 1972
- Epigelasma olsoufieffi Herbulot, 1972
- Epigelasma perineti Herbulot, 1972
- Epigelasma praenuntia Herbulot, 1972
- Epigelasma radiata Herbulot, 1972
- Epigelasma rhodostigma Herbulot, 1955
- Epigelasma rufifrons Herbulot, 1972
- Epigelasma simplaria Herbulot, 1972
- Epigelasma triplicifascia (Prout, 1912)
- Epigelasma tulear Herbulot, 1972
- Epigelasma viridibasis Herbulot, 1972
