= Mesoptila =

Scientific classification
- Kingdom: Animalia
- Phylum: Arthropoda
- Clade: Pancrustacea
- Class: Insecta
- Order: Lepidoptera
- Family: Geometridae
- Tribe: Eupitheciini
- Genus: Mesoptila; Meyrick, 1891

Synonyms
- Emmesocoma Warren, 1907

Genus of moths

Mesoptila is a genus of moths in the family Geometridae. The genus occurs in Sub-Saharan Africa and in South to East Asia to western Oceania (Australia, New Guinea).

== Species ==
There are seven recognized species:

- Mesoptila compsodes Meyrick, 1891
- Mesoptila deviridata (Warren, 1907)
- Mesoptila excita (Prout, 1958)
- Mesoptila festiva (Prout, 1916)
- Mesoptila melanolopha Swinhoe, 1895
- Mesoptila murcida Mironov & Galsworthy, 2012
- Mesoptila unitaeniata (Warren, 1906)
