= Erosina =

Scientific classification
- Kingdom: Animalia
- Phylum: Arthropoda
- Clade: Pancrustacea
- Class: Insecta
- Order: Lepidoptera
- Family: Geometridae
- Genus: Erosina; Guenée, [1858]

Genus of moths

Erosina is a genus of moths in the family Geometridae erected by Achille Guenée in 1858.

== Species ==
- Erosina cervinaria Blanchard, 1882
- Erosina excludaria Möschler, 1890
- Erosina hyberniata Guenée, [1858]
  - Erosina hyberniata fulvescens Prout, 1931
- Erosina proximata Dognin, 1891
- Erosina rusticata Maassen, 1890
