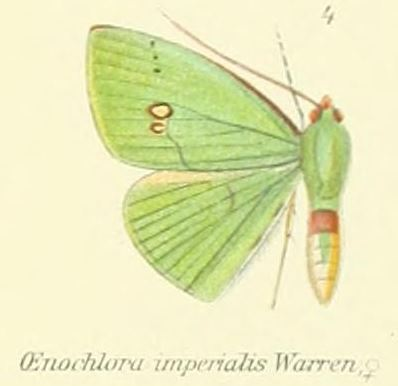
- Oenochlora imperialis

Scientific classification
- Kingdom: Animalia
- Phylum: Arthropoda
- Class: Insecta
- Order: Lepidoptera
- Family: Geometridae
- Subfamily: Geometrinae
- Genus: Oenochlora; Warren, 1896
- Species: O. imperialis

Binomial name
- Oenochlora imperialis Warren, 1896

Synonyms
- Generic: Euarestus Lucas, 1900; Specific: Euarestus nobilitans Lucas, 1900; Euarestus patrocinatus Lucas, 1900; Oenochlora majestica Prout, 1913

= Oenochlora =

Genus of moths

Oenochlora is a monotypic moth genus in the family Geometridae. Its sole species is Oenochlora imperialis, which is known from Australia. Both the genus and species were first described by Warren in 1896.
