= Epicompsa =

Scientific classification
- Kingdom: Animalia
- Phylum: Arthropoda
- Class: Insecta
- Order: Lepidoptera
- Family: Geometridae
- Genus: Epicompsa; Guest, 1887

Genus of moths

Epicompsa is a genus of moths in the family Geometridae.

== Species ==
- Epicompsa xanthocrossa Guest, 1887
