= Erebabraxas =

Scientific classification
- Kingdom: Animalia
- Phylum: Arthropoda
- Clade: Pancrustacea
- Class: Insecta
- Order: Lepidoptera
- Family: Geometridae
- Genus: Erebabraxas; Thierry-Mieg, 1907

Genus of moths

Erebabraxas is a genus of moths in the family Geometridae. It was erected by Paul Thierry-Mieg in 1907 for the only species in the genus, Erebabraxas metachromata (Walker, 1862). The species is found from Himalayas (India, Nepal, Bhutan) and Vietnam.
