= Ereunetea =

Scientific classification
- Kingdom: Animalia
- Phylum: Arthropoda
- Class: Insecta
- Order: Lepidoptera
- Family: Geometridae
- Genus: Ereunetea; Warren, 1899

Genus of moths

Ereunetea is a genus of moths in the family Geometridae described by Warren in 1899.

== Species ==
- Ereunetea fulgida Warren, 1899
- Ereunetea fulgida Warren, 1899
- Ereunetea minor (Holland, 1893)
- Ereunetea reussi (Gaede, 1914)
