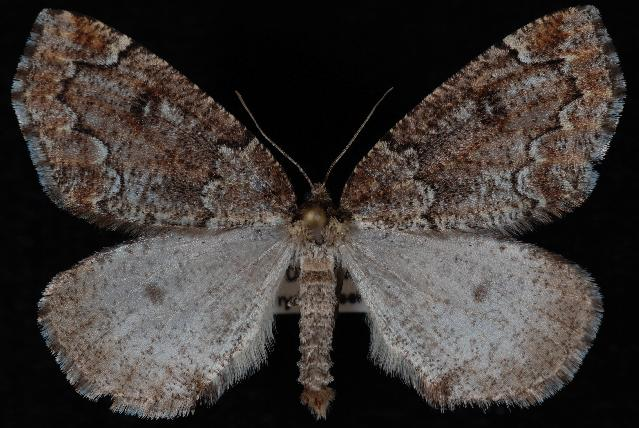
- Spodolepis substriataria substriataria
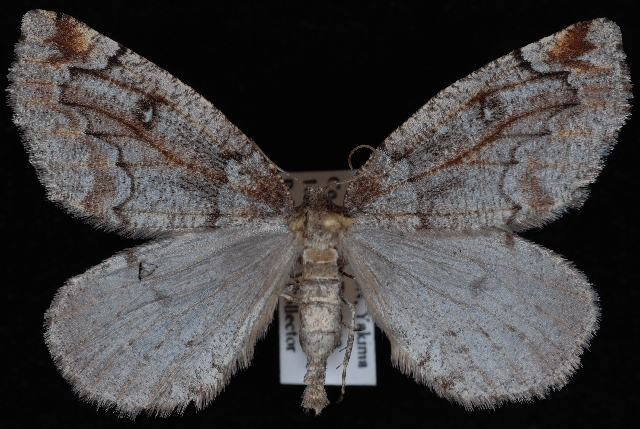
- Spodolepis substriataria danbyi

Scientific classification
- Domain: Eukaryota
- Kingdom: Animalia
- Phylum: Arthropoda
- Class: Insecta
- Order: Lepidoptera
- Family: Geometridae
- Subfamily: Oenochrominae
- Genus: Spodolepis; Hulst, 1896
- Species: S. substriataria

Binomial name
- Spodolepis substriataria Hulst, 1896

Synonyms
- Epirranthis substriataria (Hulst, 1896); Jubarella danbyi Hulst, 1898; Cleora demorsaria Strecker, 1899

= Spodolepis =

Genus of moths

Spodolepis substriataria is a moth of the family Geometridae first described by George Duryea Hulst in 1896. It is found from Alaska to Nova Scotia, south in the east to New Jersey and in the west to California.

The wingspan is 40–45 mm.

== Subspecies ==
- Spodolepis substriataria substriataria
- Spodolepis substriataria danbyi (Hulst, 1898)
