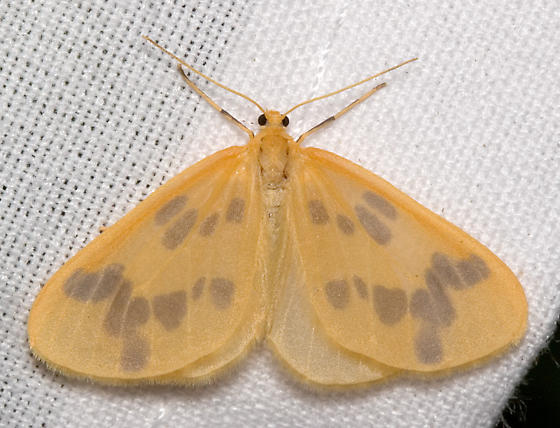
- Eubaphe mendica

Scientific classification
- Kingdom: Animalia
- Phylum: Arthropoda
- Clade: Pancrustacea
- Class: Insecta
- Order: Lepidoptera
- Family: Geometridae
- Tribe: Eudulini
- Genus: Eubaphe; Hübner, 1823

Synonyms
- Ameria Walker, 1854; Euphanessa Packard, 1864; Leptidule Butler, 1877

= Eubaphe =

Genus of moths

Eubaphe is a genus of moths in the family Geometridae erected by Jacob Hübner in 1823.

== Species ==
- Eubaphe conformis (Walker, 1854)
- Eubaphe helveta (Barnes, 1907)
- Eubaphe integra (Walker, 1866)
- Eubaphe lineata (Druce, 1885)
- Eubaphe medea (Druce, 1885)
- Eubaphe mendica (Walker, 1854)
- Eubaphe meridiana (Slosson, 1889)
- Eubaphe rotundata (Cassino & Swett, 1922)
- Eubaphe tripunctata (Druce, 1885)
- Eubaphe unicolor (Robinson, 1869)
