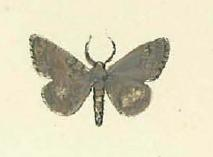
- Eumannia oppositaria

Scientific classification
- Domain: Eukaryota
- Kingdom: Animalia
- Phylum: Arthropoda
- Class: Insecta
- Order: Lepidoptera
- Family: Geometridae
- Tribe: Boarmiini
- Genus: Eumannia; D. S. Fletcher, 1979

= Eumannia =

Genus of moths

Eumannia is a genus of moths in the family Geometridae. It was described by David Stephen Fletcher in 1979.

== Species ==
- Eumannia lepraria (Rebel, 1909)
- Eumannia oppositaria (Mann, 1864)
- Eumannia psyloritaria (Reisser, 1958)
