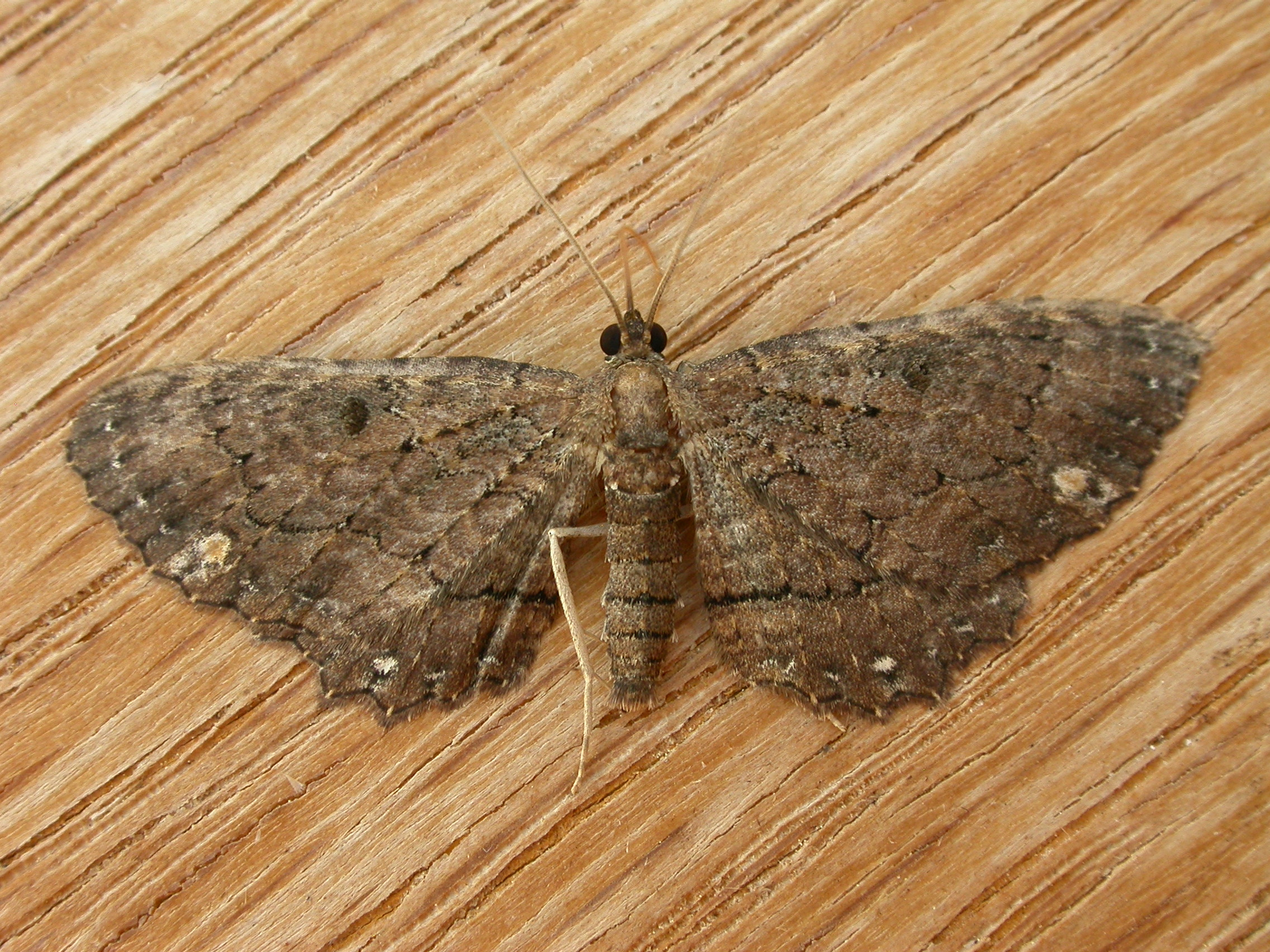
- Eccymatoge fulvida

Scientific classification
- Kingdom: Animalia
- Phylum: Arthropoda
- Class: Insecta
- Order: Lepidoptera
- Family: Geometridae
- Subfamily: Larentiinae
- Genus: Eccymatoge; L.B. Prout, 1913

Type species
- Hyrdriomena callizona Lower, 1894

= Eccymatoge =

Genus of moths

Eccymatoge is a genus of moths in the family Geometridae.

== Species ==
There are five recognized species:

- Eccymatoge aorista (Turner, 1907)
- Eccymatoge callizona (Lower, 1894)
- Eccymatoge fulvida (Turner, 1907)
- Eccymatoge melanoterma Prout, 1913
- Eccymatoge morphna Turner, 1922

Four of the species are known from Australia and the remaining one, Eccymatoge melanoterma, from South Africa.
