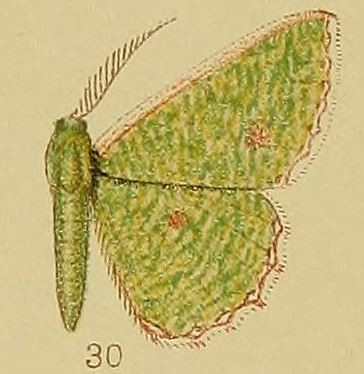
- Euproutia aggravaria

Scientific classification
- Kingdom: Animalia
- Phylum: Arthropoda
- Class: Insecta
- Order: Lepidoptera
- Family: Geometridae
- Subfamily: Geometrinae
- Genus: Euproutia; D. S. Fletcher, 1979

Synonyms
- Metacineta Prout, 1912

= Euproutia =

Genus of moths

Euproutia is a genus of moths in the family Geometridae described by David Stephen Fletcher in 1979.

== Species ==
- Euproutia aggravaria Guenée, [1858]
  - Euproutia aggravaria intermaculata Warren, 1905
- Euproutia rufomarginata Pagenstecher, 1893
- Euproutia vernicoma Prout, 1913
