= Eubordeta =

Scientific classification
- Kingdom: Animalia
- Phylum: Arthropoda
- Class: Insecta
- Order: Lepidoptera
- Family: Geometridae
- Genus: Eubordeta; Rothschild, 1904

Genus of moths

Eubordeta is a genus of moths in the family Geometridae described by Rothschild in 1904.

== Species ==
- Eubordeta eichhorni Rothschild, 1904
- Eubordeta flammea Jordan, 1912
- Eubordeta flammens Bethune-Baker, 1910
