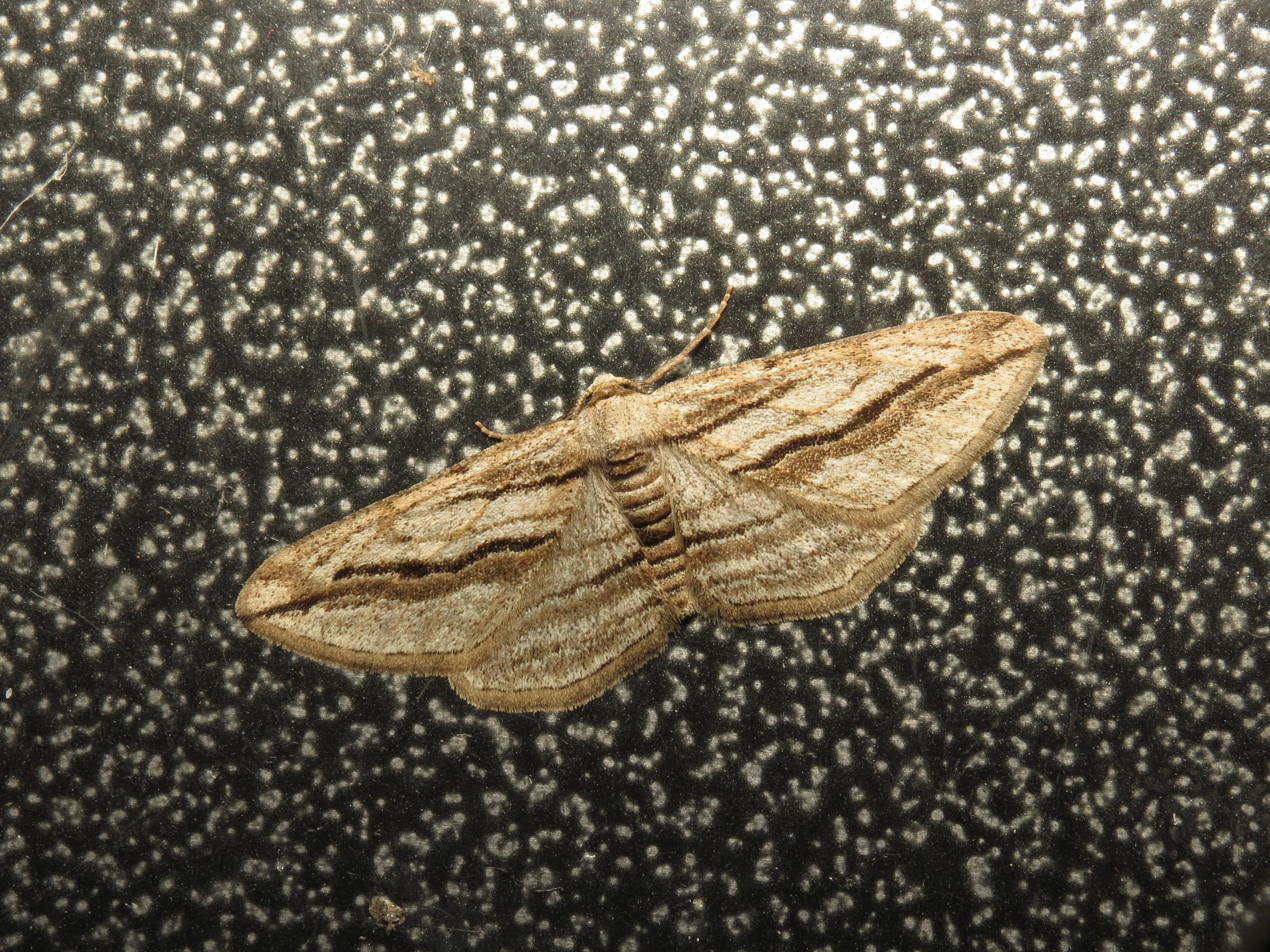
- Ecleora solieraria

Scientific classification
- Kingdom: Animalia
- Phylum: Arthropoda
- Class: Insecta
- Order: Lepidoptera
- Family: Geometridae
- Tribe: Boarmiini
- Genus: Ecleora; Wehrli, 1943

= Ecleora =

Genus of moth

Ecleora is a genus of moths in the family Geometridae.

== Species ==
- Ecleora brandti (Wehrli, 1941)
- Ecleora haroldaria (Oberthur, 1913)
- Ecleora solieraria (Rambur, 1834)
