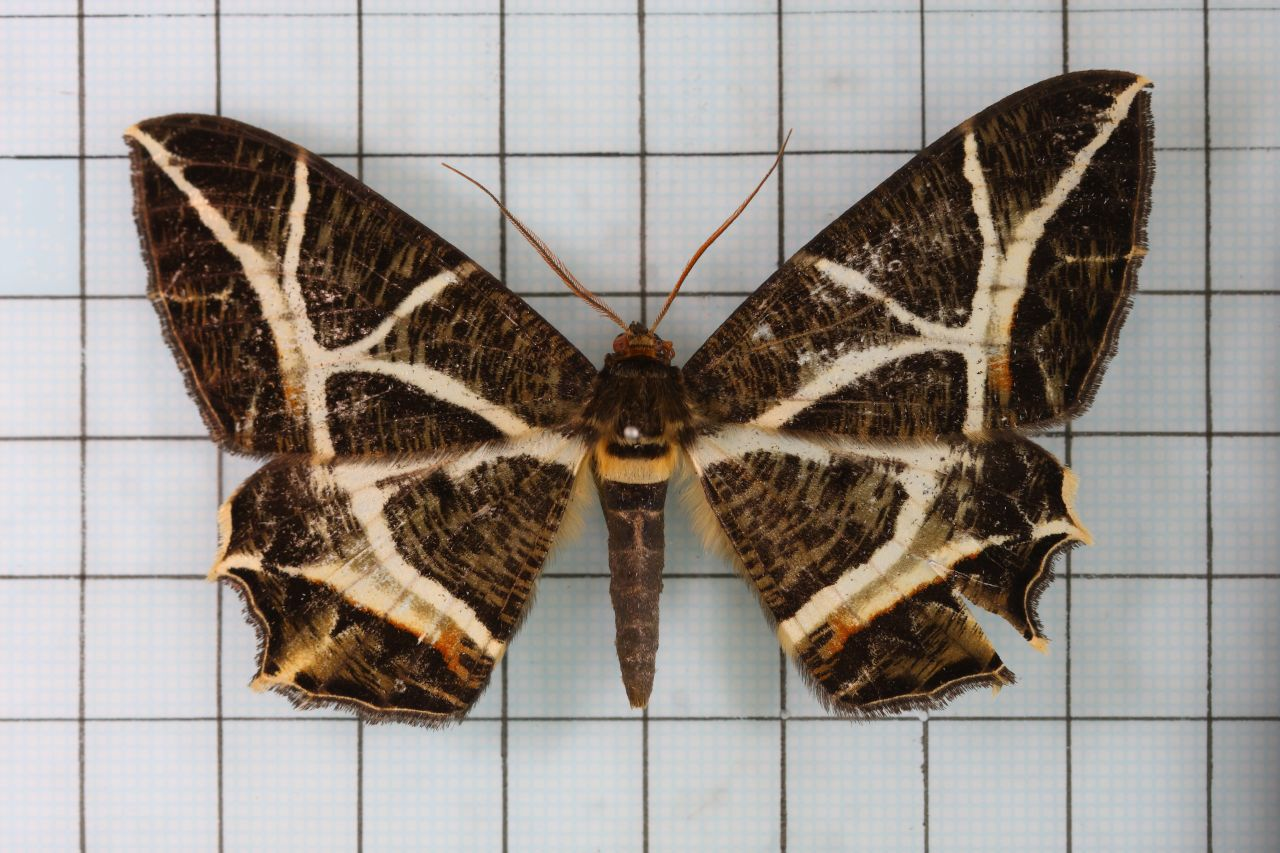
- Erebomorpha fulguraria

Scientific classification
- Kingdom: Animalia
- Phylum: Arthropoda
- Class: Insecta
- Order: Lepidoptera
- Family: Geometridae
- Tribe: Boarmiini
- Genus: Erebomorpha; Walker, 1860

= Erebomorpha =

Genus of moths

Erebomorpha is a genus of moths in the family Geometridae erected by Francis Walker in 1860.

== Species ==
- Erebomorpha consors Butler, 1878
- Erebomorpha fulguraria Walker, 1860
- Erebomorpha fulgurita Walker, 1860
