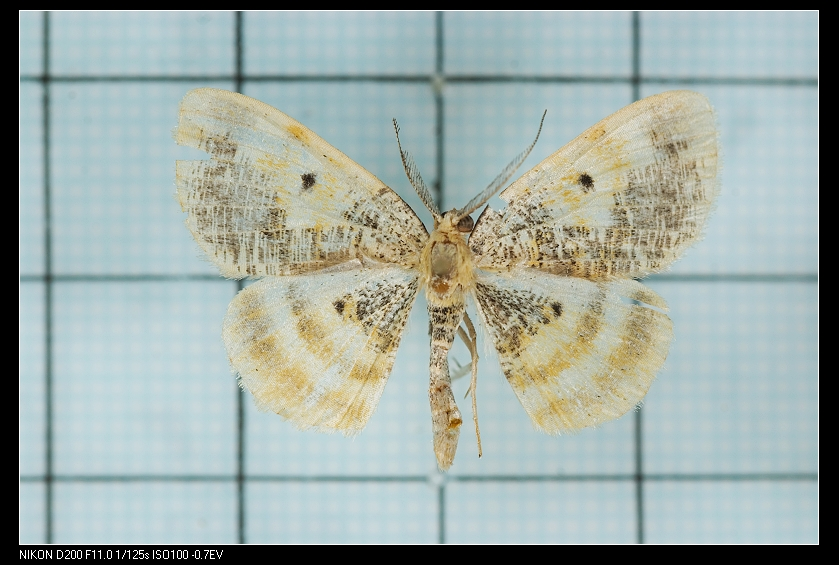
- Euchristophia cumulata meridionalis

Scientific classification
- Domain: Eukaryota
- Kingdom: Animalia
- Phylum: Arthropoda
- Class: Insecta
- Order: Lepidoptera
- Family: Geometridae
- Subfamily: Ennominae
- Genus: Euchristophia; D. S. Fletcher, 1979
- Species: E. cumulata

Binomial name
- Euchristophia cumulata (Christoph, 1880)

Synonyms
- Genus: Pogonitis Christoph, 1881; Species: Pogonitis cumulata Christoph, 1881; Pogonitis sinobia Wehrli, 1939

= Euchristophia =

Genus of moths

Euchristophia is a monotypic moth genus in the family Geometridae described by David Stephen Fletcher in 1979. It contains only one species, Euchristophia cumulata, described by Hugo Theodor Christoph in 1880, which is found in Taiwan, Japan and the Russian Far East.

The wingspan is 21–25 mm.

== Subspecies ==
- Euchristophia cumulata cumulata (Japan)
- Euchristophia cumulata meridionalis Inoue, 1986 (Taiwan)
- Euchristophia cumulata sinobia (Wehrli, 1939)
