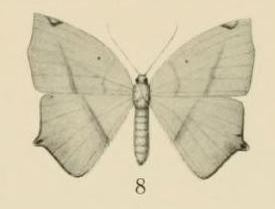

Scientific classification
- Kingdom: Animalia
- Phylum: Arthropoda
- Class: Insecta
- Order: Lepidoptera
- Family: Geometridae
- Genus: Epigynopteryx; Warren, 1895

Synonyms
- Eurythecodes Warren, 1897; Paracrocota Warren, 1897; Pseudosyngria Sick, 1937; Trisyndeta Warren, 1897

= Epigynopteryx =

Genus of moths

Epigynopteryx is a genus of moths in the family Geometridae. The genus was described by Warren in 1895.

== Species ==
Species of this genus are:

- Epigynopteryx affirmata Herbulot, 1997
- Epigynopteryx africana (Aurivillius, 1910)
- Epigynopteryx altivagans Herbulot, 1993
- Epigynopteryx ansorgei (Warren, 1901)
- Epigynopteryx artemis Viette, 1973
- Epigynopteryx aurantiaca Herbulot, 1965
- Epigynopteryx borgeaudi (Herbulot, 1957)
- Epigynopteryx captiva Herbulot, 1997
- Epigynopteryx castanea Viette, 1977
- Epigynopteryx coffeae Prout, 1934
- Epigynopteryx colligata (Saalmüller, 1891)
- Epigynopteryx commixta Warren, 1901
- Epigynopteryx curvimargo (Hampson, 1909)
- Epigynopteryx declinans Herbulot, 1965
- Epigynopteryx dia Viette, 1973
- Epigynopteryx dorcas Prout, 1932
- Epigynopteryx duboisi Herbulot, 1981
- Epigynopteryx eudallasta D. S. Fletcher, 1978
- Epigynopteryx eugonia Prout, 1935
- Epigynopteryx fimosa (Warren, 1905)
- Epigynopteryx flavedinaria (Guenée, 1857)
- Epigynopteryx flexa Prout, 1931
- Epigynopteryx fulva (Warren, 1897)
- Epigynopteryx glycera Prout, 1934
- Epigynopteryx guichardi Wiltshire, 1982
- Epigynopteryx impunctata (Warren, 1898)
- Epigynopteryx indiscretaria (Mabille, 1898)
- Epigynopteryx jacksoni Carcasson, 1964
- Epigynopteryx langaria (Holland, 1920)
- Epigynopteryx lioloma Prout, 1931
- Epigynopteryx maculosata (Warren, 1901)
- Epigynopteryx maeviaria (Guenée, 1858)
- Epigynopteryx metrocamparia (Bastelberger, 1908)
- Epigynopteryx modesta (Butler, 1880)
- Epigynopteryx molochina Herbulot, 1984
- Epigynopteryx mutabilis (Warren, 1903)
- Epigynopteryx nigricola (Warren, 1897)
- Epigynopteryx ommatoclesis (Prout, 1922)
- Epigynopteryx piperata (Saalmüller, 1880)
- Epigynopteryx prolixa (Prout, 1915)
- Epigynopteryx prophylacis Herbulot, 1984
- Epigynopteryx pygmaea Herbulot, 1957
- Epigynopteryx rougeoti Herbulot, 1977
- Epigynopteryx scotti D. S. Fletcher, 1959
- Epigynopteryx silvestris Herbulot, 1954
- Epigynopteryx stictigramma (Hampson, 1909)
- Epigynopteryx straminea (Warren, 1897)
- Epigynopteryx subspersa (Warren, 1897)
- Epigynopteryx tabitha Warren, 1901
- Epigynopteryx tenera Viette, 1973
- Epigynopteryx termininota Prout, 1934
- Epigynopteryx townsendi D. S. Fletcher, 1958
- Epigynopteryx variabile Viette, 1973
- Epigynopteryx venosa Herbulot, 1984
- Epigynopteryx xeres Viette, 1973
