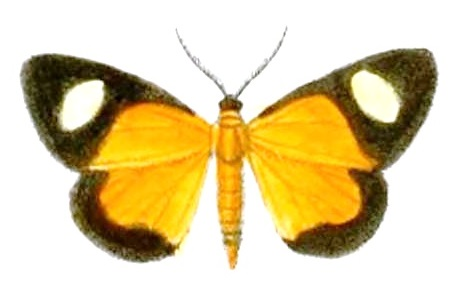
- Emplocia lassippa

Scientific classification
- Kingdom: Animalia
- Phylum: Arthropoda
- Class: Insecta
- Order: Lepidoptera
- Family: Geometridae
- Subfamily: Ennominae
- Genus: Emplocia; Herrich-Schaffer, 1855

Synonyms
- Devara Walker, 1856

= Emplocia =

Genus of moths

Emplocia is a genus of moths in the family Geometridae.

== Species ==
- Emplocia aurantiaria (Thierry-Mieg, 1895)
- Emplocia bifenestrata Herrich-Schaffer, 1855
- Emplocia erycinoides (Walker, 1854)
- Emplocia fleximargo (Dognin, 1903)
- Emplocia lassippa (Druce, 1890)
- Emplocia pallor (Druce, 1893)
- Emplocia tricolor Felder & Rogenhofer, 1875
- Emplocia xanthion (Druce, 1907)
