= Erschoffia =

Scientific classification
- Kingdom: Animalia
- Phylum: Arthropoda
- Class: Insecta
- Order: Lepidoptera
- Family: Geometridae
- Genus: Erschoffia

Genus of moths

Erschoffia is a genus of moth in the family Geometridae.
