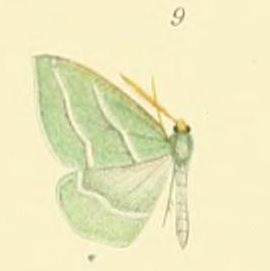

Scientific classification
- Kingdom: Animalia
- Phylum: Arthropoda
- Class: Insecta
- Order: Lepidoptera
- Family: Geometridae
- Genus: Euloxia; Warren, 1894

= Euloxia =

Genus of moths

Euloxia is a genus of moths in the family Geometridae described by Warren in 1894.

== Species ==
- Euloxia argocnemis (Meyrick, 1888)
- Euloxia beryllina (Meyrick, 1888)
- Euloxia fugitivaria (Guenée, 1857)
- Euloxia hypsithrona (Meyrick, 1888)
- Euloxia isadelpha Turner, 1910
- Euloxia leucochorda (Meyrick, 1888)
- Euloxia meandraria (Guenée, 1857)
- Euloxia meracula Turner, 1942
- Euloxia ochthaula (Meyrick, 1888)
- Euloxia pyropa (Meyrick, 1888)
