= Eudule =

Scientific classification
- Kingdom: Animalia
- Phylum: Arthropoda
- Clade: Pancrustacea
- Class: Insecta
- Order: Lepidoptera
- Family: Geometridae
- Tribe: Eudulini
- Genus: Eudule; Hübner, 1823

Synonyms
- Polyomma Staudinger, 1894

Genus of moths

Eudule is a genus of moths in the family Geometridae erected by Jacob Hübner in 1823.

== Species ==
- Eudule bimacula Walker, 1854 Colombia
- Eudule pulchricolora Hübner, 1823 West Indies
- Eudule venata Schaus, 1892 Peru
- Eudule sceata (Schaus, 1892) Peru
- Eudule limbata Burmeister, 1878 Peru
- Eudule una (Schaus, 1892) Rio de Janeiro in Brazil
