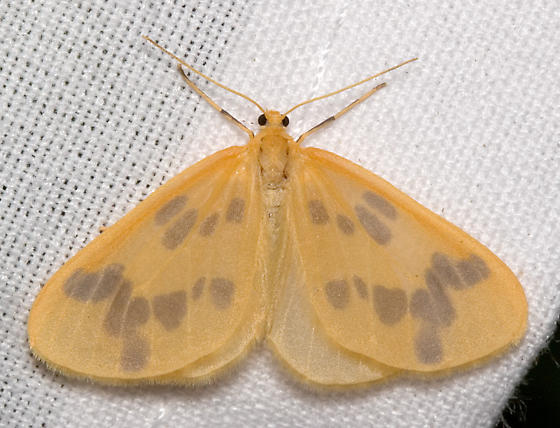
- Eubaphe mendica

Scientific classification
- Domain: Eukaryota
- Kingdom: Animalia
- Phylum: Arthropoda
- Class: Insecta
- Order: Lepidoptera
- Family: Geometridae
- Subfamily: Larentiinae
- Tribe: Eudulini; Warren, 1897

= Eudulini =

Tribe of moths

Eudulini is a tribe of geometer moths under the subfamily Larentiinae.

== Genera ==
- Eubaphe Hübner, 1823
- Eudule Hübner, 1823
- Eudulophasia Warren, 1897
