= Erythrolophus =

Scientific classification
- Domain: Eukaryota
- Kingdom: Animalia
- Phylum: Arthropoda
- Class: Insecta
- Order: Lepidoptera
- Family: Geometridae
- Genus: Erythrolophus; Swinhoe, 1892
- Species: E. fascicorpus

Binomial name
- Erythrolophus fascicorpus Swinhoe, 1892

Synonyms
- Erythrolophus fuscicorpus Candèze, 1927

Genus of moths

Erythrolophus is a monotypic moth genus in the family Geometridae. Its only species, Erythrolophus fascicorpus, is found in Assam, India. Both the genus and species were described by Charles Swinhoe in 1892.
