= Eumera =

Scientific classification
- Kingdom: Animalia
- Phylum: Arthropoda
- Class: Insecta
- Order: Lepidoptera
- Family: Geometridae
- Tribe: Colotoini
- Genus: Eumera; Staudinger, 1892

Genus of moths

Eumera is a genus of moths in the family Geometridae described by Staudinger in 1892.

== Species ==
- Eumera hoeferi Wehrli, 1934
- Eumera regina Staudinger, 1892
