= Euexia =

Scientific classification
- Kingdom: Animalia
- Phylum: Arthropoda
- Clade: Pancrustacea
- Class: Insecta
- Order: Lepidoptera
- Family: Geometridae
- Tribe: Boarmiini
- Genus: Euexia; Prout, 1915

Genus of moths

Euexia is a genus of moths in the family Geometridae described by Prout in 1915.

== Species ==
- Euexia percnopus Prout, 1915
- Euexia aora Prout, 1922
