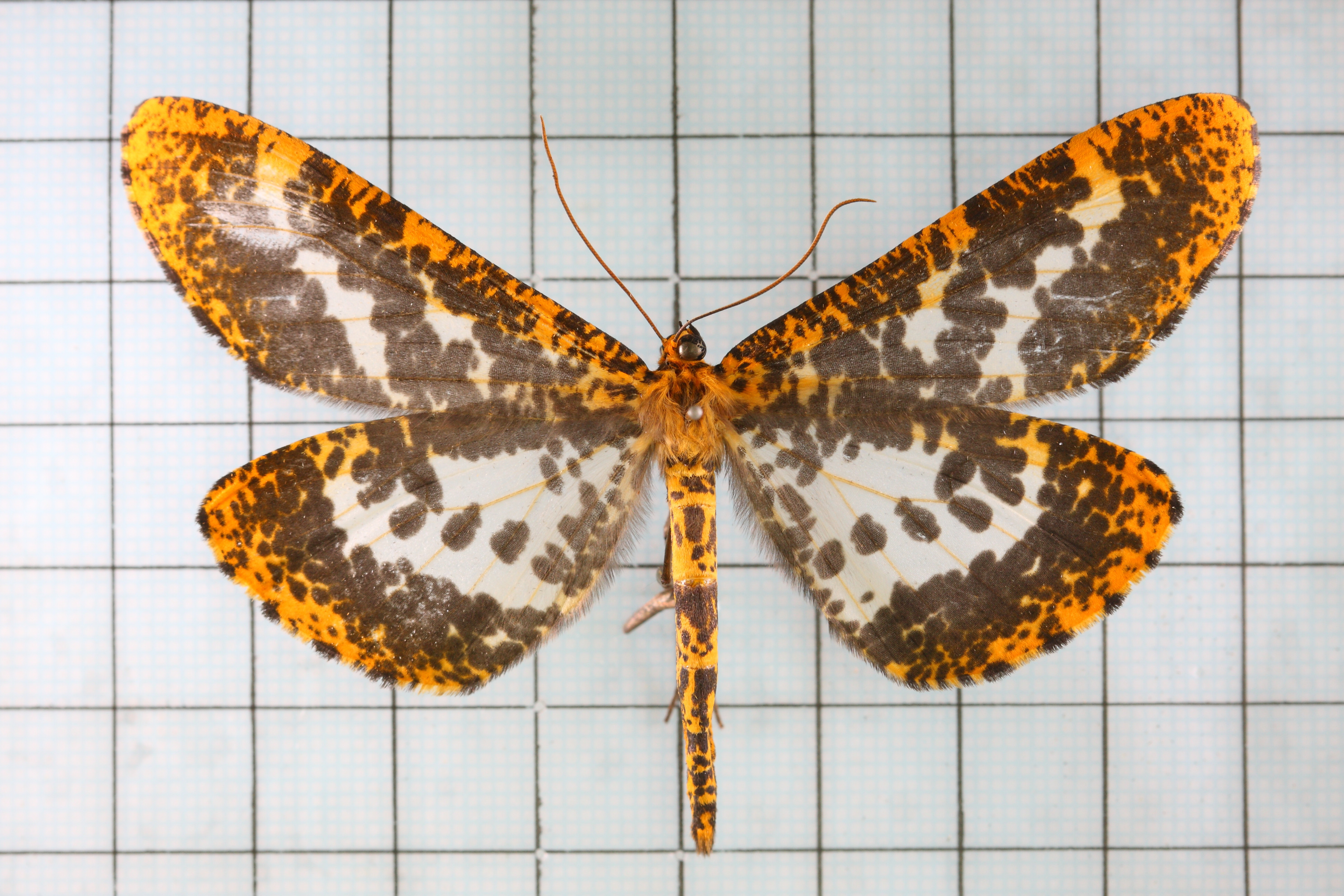
- Obeidia gigantearia

Scientific classification
- Kingdom: Animalia
- Phylum: Arthropoda
- Class: Insecta
- Order: Lepidoptera
- Family: Geometridae
- Subfamily: Ennominae
- Genus: Obeidia; Walker, 1862

Synonyms
- Epobeidia Wehrli, 1939; Parobeidia Wehrli, 1939

= Obeidia =

Genus of moths

Obeidia is a genus of moths in the family Geometridae erected by Francis Walker in 1862.

== Species ==
- Obeidia aurantiaca (Alpheraky, 1892)
- Obeidia diversicolor Warren, 1901
- Obeidia epiphleba Wehrli, 1936
- Obeidia fumosa Warren, 1893
- Obeidia gigantearia Leech, 1897
- Obeidia horishana Matsumura, 1931
- Obeidia idaria (Oberthur, 1893)
- Obeidia irregularis Wehrli, 1933
- Obeidia leptosticta Wehrli, 1933
- Obeidia lucifera Swinhoe, 1893
- Obeidia millepunctata Warren, 1893
- Obeidia postmarginata Wehrli, 1933
- Obeidia rongaria (Oberthur, 1893)
- Obeidia tigrata (Guenee, 1857)
- Obeidia vagipardata Walker, 1862
