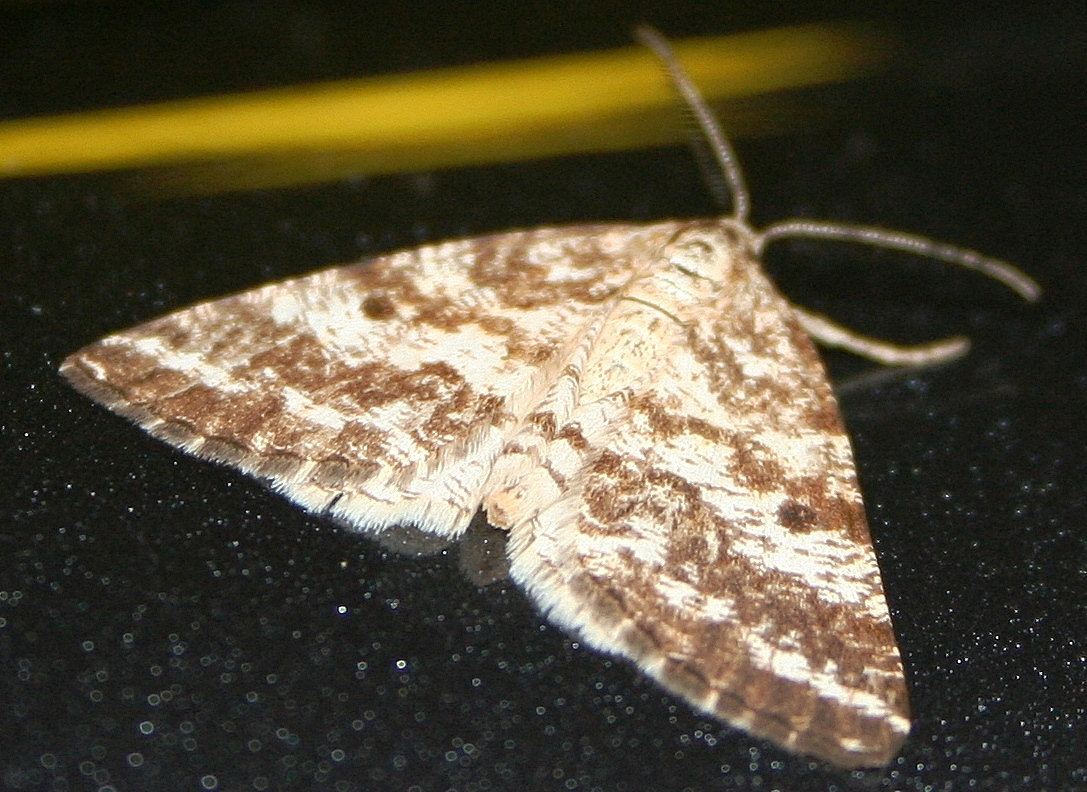
- Pine powder moth (Eufidonia convergaria)

Scientific classification
- Kingdom: Animalia
- Phylum: Arthropoda
- Clade: Pancrustacea
- Class: Insecta
- Order: Lepidoptera
- Family: Geometridae
- Tribe: Melanolophiini
- Genus: Eufidonia; Packard, 1876

= Eufidonia =

Genus of moths

Eufidonia is a genus of moths in the family Geometridae first described by Packard in 1876.

== Species ==
- Eufidonia convergaria (Walker, 1860)
- Eufidonia discospilata (Walker, 1862)
- Eufidonia notataria (Walker, 1860)
