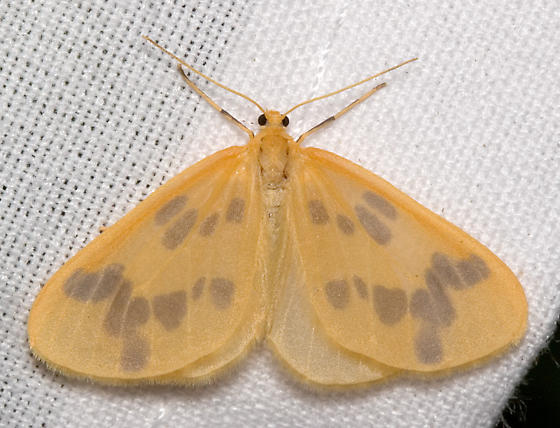

Scientific classification
- Kingdom: Animalia
- Phylum: Arthropoda
- Clade: Pancrustacea
- Class: Insecta
- Order: Lepidoptera
- Family: Geometridae
- Genus: Eubaphe
- Species: E. mendica

Binomial name
- Eubaphe mendica (Walker, 1854)

Synonyms
- Nudaria mendica Walker, 1854; Eubaphe biseriata (Herrich-Schäffer, 1855)

= Eubaphe mendica =

Species of moth

Eubaphe mendica, the beggar, is a moth of the family Geometridae. It was first described by Francis Walker in 1854 and it is found in eastern North America.

The wingspan is 21–30 mm. Adults are on wing from May to September. There are three generations per year.

The larvae feed on Acer and Viola species.
