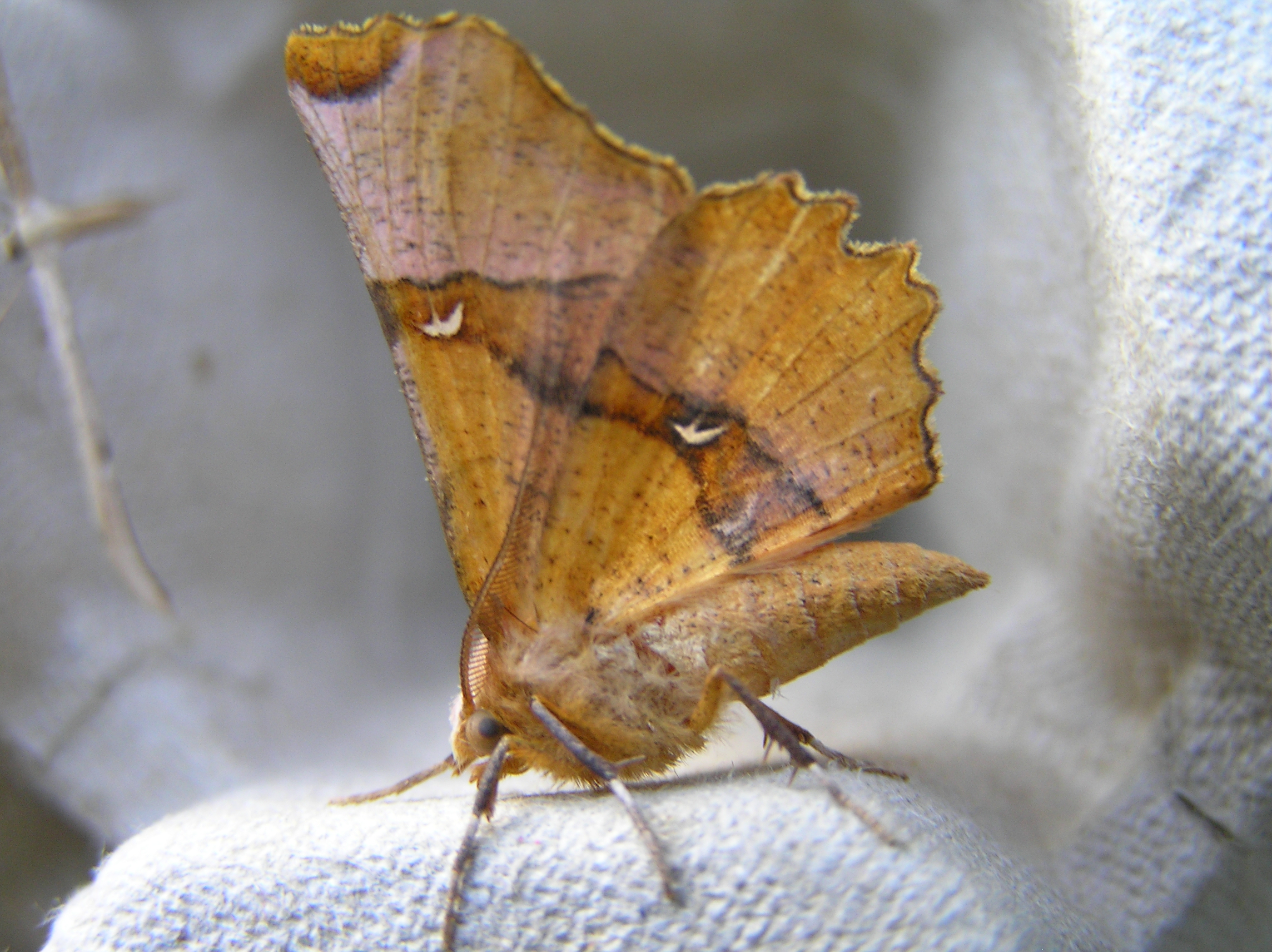
- The lunar thorn (Selenia lunularia) has a color pattern characteristic for this tribe

Scientific classification
- Kingdom: Animalia
- Phylum: Arthropoda
- Clade: Pancrustacea
- Class: Insecta
- Order: Lepidoptera
- Family: Geometridae
- Subfamily: Ennominae
- Tribe: Ennomini; Duponchel, 1845

Genera
- See text

Synonyms
- Crocallidi Tutt, 1896; Crocallini Tutt, 1896; Ennomites Duponchel, 1845; Odopteridi Stephens, 1850; Odopterini Stephens, 1850; Seleniidi Tutt, 1896; Seleniini Tutt, 1896 and see text

= Ennomini =

Tribe of moths

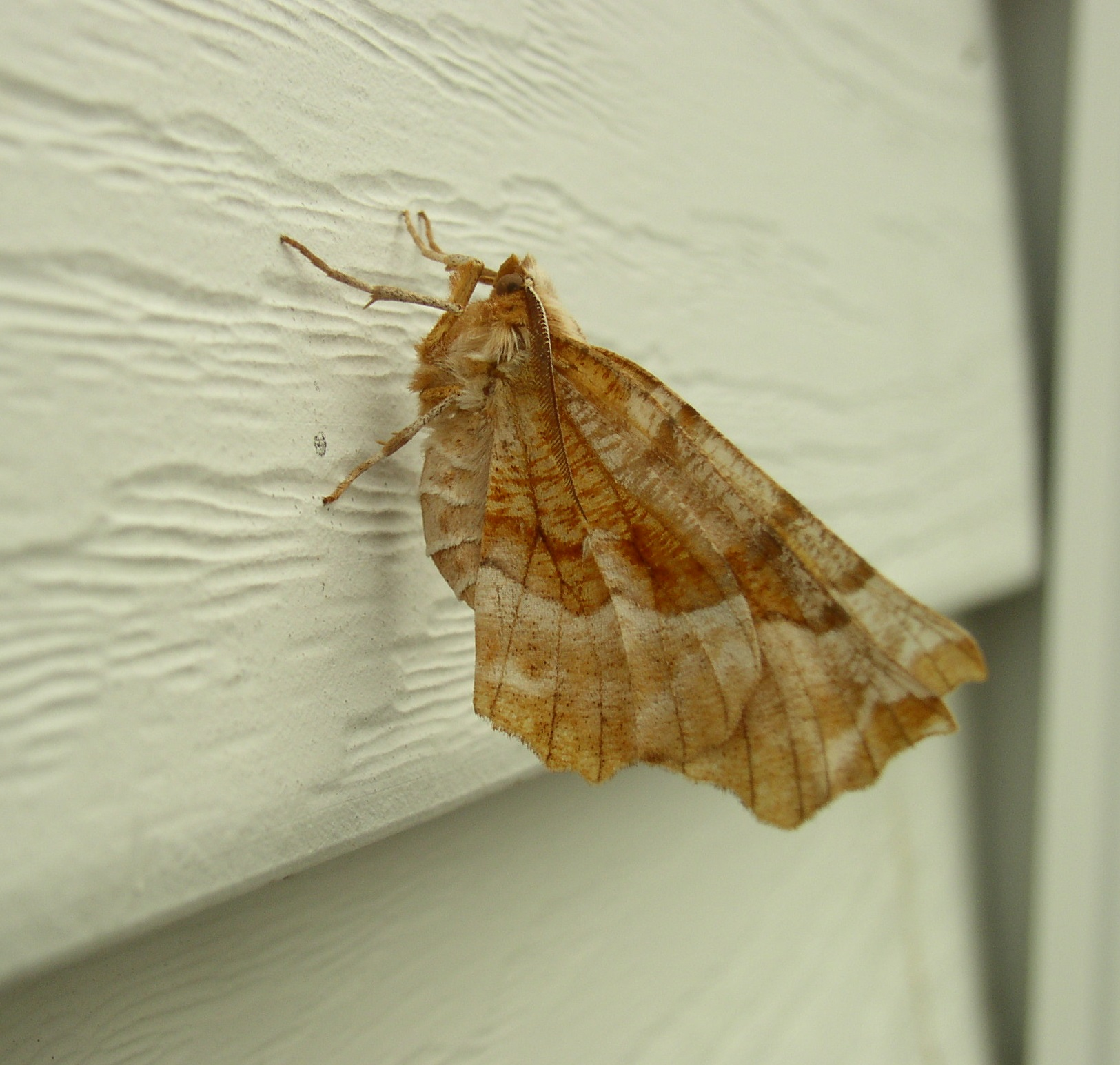
Male Selenia kentaria

The Ennomini are a tribe of geometer moths in the Ennominae subfamily. They are large-bodied and rather undistinguished Ennominae, overall showing similarities to the closely related Azelinini and Nacophorini.

Most have a beige to brown color, and they rarely possess the disruptive cryptic patterns seen in many other geometer moths. A typical ennomiine wing pattern consists of two or three costal to dorsal sections, one of which is often darker in color. There is rarely more than one conspicuous dark or light spot on each side of both wings, and many do not have any particularly prominent markings at all.

== Systematics ==
Phaeoura, which includes Phaeoura quernaria – the type species of the Nacophorini – nowadays, appears to be closer to the Ennomini than to the bulk of genera currently placed in the Nacophorini. It might be moved into the present tribe, making Nacophorini a junior synonym of Ennomini. The Lithinini and the Campaeini seem to warrant merging with the bulk of the Nacophorini, and in that case the resulting group would probably be named Lithinini. On the other hand, a more radical approach to achieve monophyly would be to merge all three tribes into the Ennomini. The enigmatic genus Hoplosauris, of rather uncertain placement in the Ennominae, is in some respects intermediate between the Nacophorini and the Ennomini.

=== Selected genera and species ===
As numerous ennomine genera have not yet been assigned to a tribe, the genus list is preliminary.

- Acrodontis - might belong in Boarmiini
- Apeira
- Artiora
- Crocallis
  - Scalloped oak, Crocallis elinguaria
- Devenilia
- Ectephrina
- Eilicrinia
- Ennomos
  - Canary-shouldered thorn, Ennomos alniaria
  - Large thorn, Ennomos autumnaria
  - September thorn, Ennomos erosaria
  - August thorn, Ennomos quercinaria
- Exangerona
- Hoplosauris (tentatively placed here)
- Lignyoptera
- Ocoelophora
- Odontopera
  - Scalloped hazel, Odontopera bidentata
- Pachycnemia
- Proteostrenia
- Scionomia
- Selenia
  - Purple thorn, Selenia tetralunaria
- Seleniopsis
- Scodiomima
- Xerodes - might belong in Boarmiini
