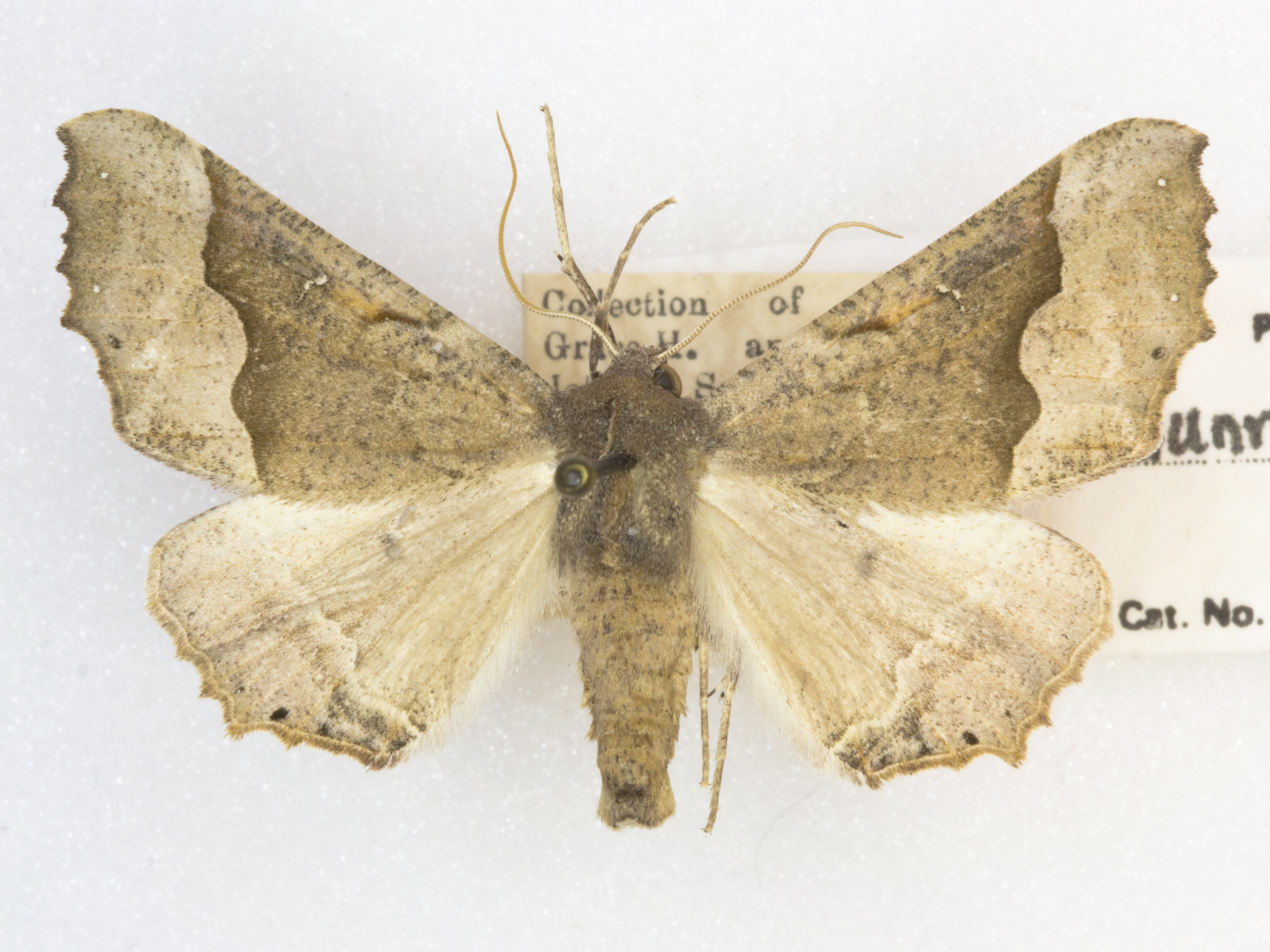

Scientific classification
- Domain: Eukaryota
- Kingdom: Animalia
- Phylum: Arthropoda
- Class: Insecta
- Order: Lepidoptera
- Family: Geometridae
- Tribe: Azelinini
- Genus: Pero
- Species: P. macdunnoughi

Binomial name
- Pero macdunnoughi Cassino & Swett, 1922

= Pero macdunnoughi =

Species of moth

Pero macdunnoughi, or Mcdunnough's pero, is a species of geometrid moth in the family Geometridae. It is found in North America.

The MONA or Hodges number for Pero macdunnoughi is 6758.
