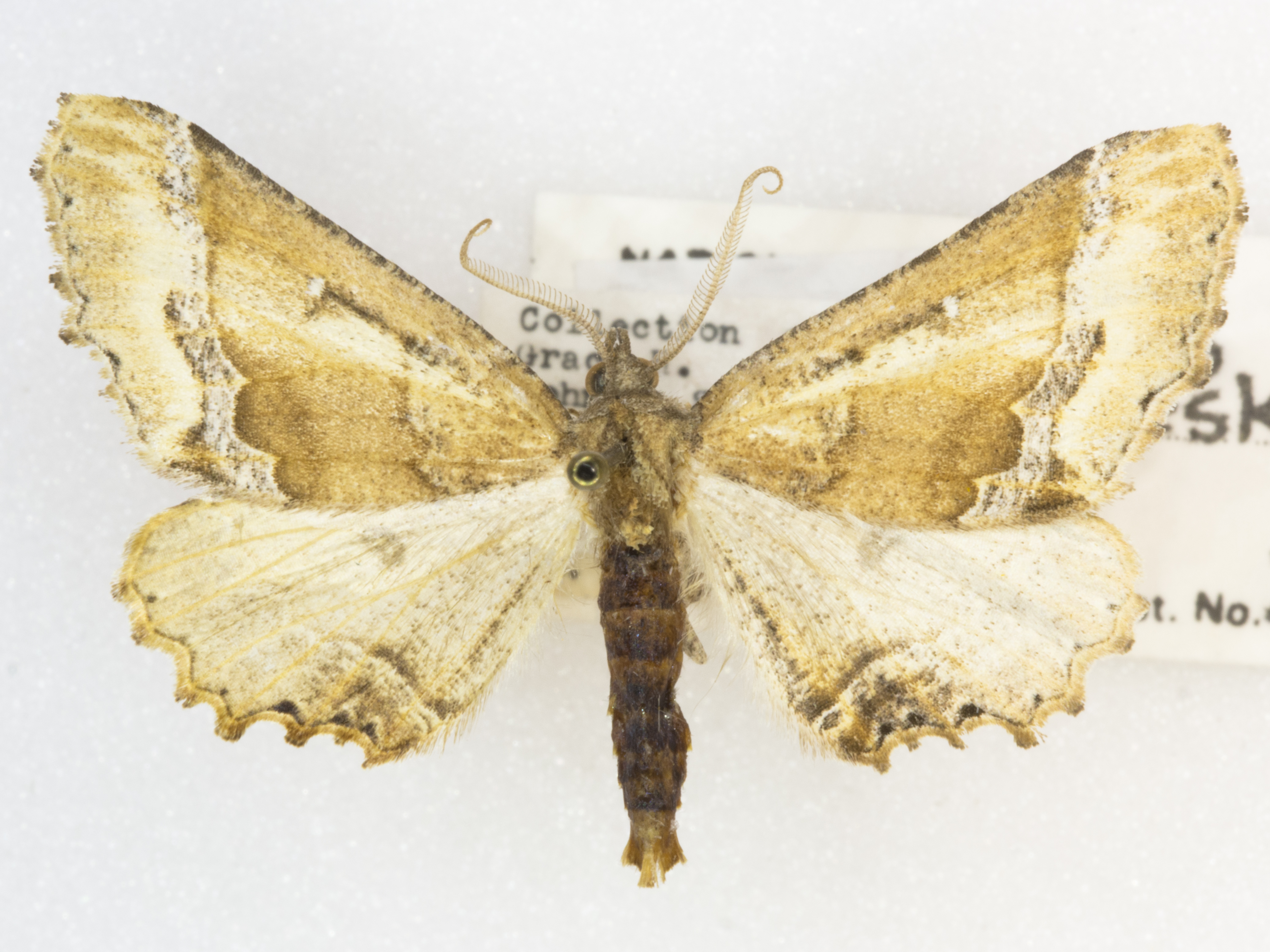

Scientific classification
- Kingdom: Animalia
- Phylum: Arthropoda
- Class: Insecta
- Order: Lepidoptera
- Family: Geometridae
- Genus: Pero
- Species: P. meskaria

Binomial name
- Pero meskaria (Packard, 1876)

Synonyms
- Stenaspilates meskaria Packard, 1876; Azelina albomacularia H. Edwards, 1882; Azelina arizonaria H. Edwards, 1882; Selidosema muricolor Hulst, 1896; Stenaspilates albidula Hulst, 1900

= Pero meskaria =

Species of moth

Pero meskaria, Meske's pero moth, is a species of moth in the family Geometridae (geometrid moths). It was described by Alpheus Spring Packard in 1876 and is found in North America, where it has been recorded from southern Texas west to California, east through Nevada, Utah and western Colorado.

The length of the forewings is 13–16 mm.

The larvae feed on Clematis drummondii.

== Etymology ==
The species was named in honor of Otto von Meske.
