= Pero pima =

Scientific classification
- Domain: Eukaryota
- Kingdom: Animalia
- Phylum: Arthropoda
- Class: Insecta
- Order: Lepidoptera
- Family: Geometridae
- Tribe: Azelinini
- Genus: Pero
- Species: P. pima

Binomial name
- Pero pima Poole, 1987

Species of moth

Pero pima is a species of geometrid moth in the family Geometridae. It is found in North America.

The MONA or Hodges number for Pero pima is 6762.1.
