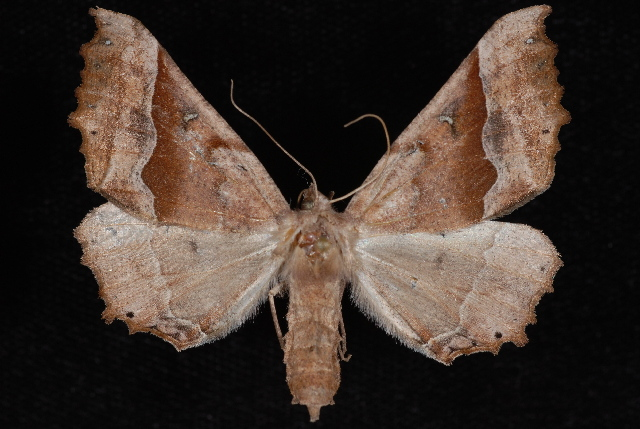

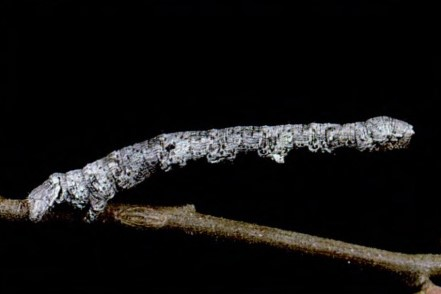
- Adult (top) and larva (bottom)

Scientific classification
- Kingdom: Animalia
- Phylum: Arthropoda
- Clade: Pancrustacea
- Class: Insecta
- Order: Lepidoptera
- Family: Geometridae
- Tribe: Azelinini
- Genus: Pero
- Species: P. mizon

Binomial name
- Pero mizon Rindge, 1955

= Pero mizon =

Species of moth

Pero mizon is a species of geometrid moth in the family Geometridae. It is found in North America.
