= Pero radiosaria =

Scientific classification
- Kingdom: Animalia
- Phylum: Arthropoda
- Clade: Pancrustacea
- Class: Insecta
- Order: Lepidoptera
- Family: Geometridae
- Genus: Pero
- Species: P. radiosaria

Binomial name
- Pero radiosaria (Hulst, 1886)

Synonyms
- Azelina radiosaria Hulst, 1886; Stenaspilates apapinaria Dyar, 1908; Azelina fulvata Warren, 1905; Stenaspilates metzaria Dyar, 1909; Pero muricolor Warren, 1900; Stenaspilates rectissima Dyar, 1910

Species of moth

Pero radiosaria is a species of moth in the family Geometridae (geometrid moths). It was described by George Duryea Hulst in 1886 and is found in North America, where it has been recorded from southern California to Texas.

The wingspan is 28–36 mm. Adults have been recorded on wing year round.

The larvae feed on Clematis drummondii.

The MONA or Hodges number for Pero radiosaria is 6749.
