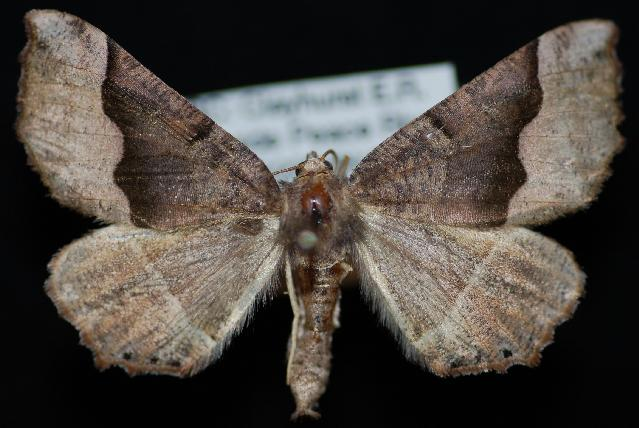

Scientific classification
- Kingdom: Animalia
- Phylum: Arthropoda
- Class: Insecta
- Order: Lepidoptera
- Family: Geometridae
- Tribe: Azelinini
- Genus: Pero
- Species: P. honestaria

Binomial name
- Pero honestaria (Walker, 1860)

= Pero honestaria =

Species of moth

Pero honestaria, the honest pero, is a species of geometrid moth in the family Geometridae. It is found in North America.

The MONA or Hodges number for Pero honestaria is 6753.
