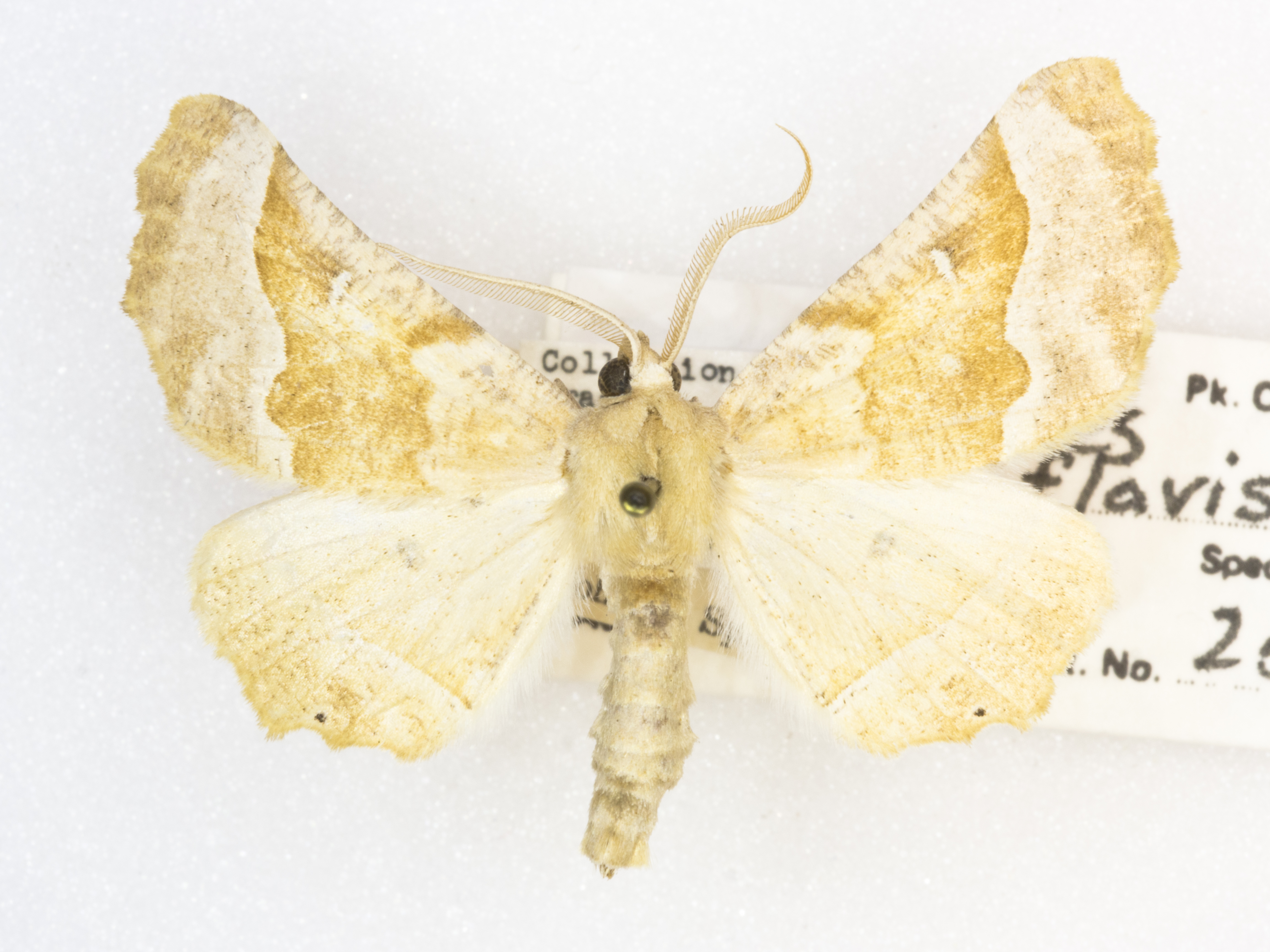

Scientific classification
- Domain: Eukaryota
- Kingdom: Animalia
- Phylum: Arthropoda
- Class: Insecta
- Order: Lepidoptera
- Family: Geometridae
- Tribe: Azelinini
- Genus: Pero
- Species: P. flavisaria

Binomial name
- Pero flavisaria (Grossbeck, 1906)

= Pero flavisaria =

Species of moth

Pero flavisaria is a species of geometrid moth in the family Geometridae. It is found in North America.

The MONA or Hodges number for Pero flavisaria is 6751.
