= Pero modestus =

Scientific classification
- Domain: Eukaryota
- Kingdom: Animalia
- Phylum: Arthropoda
- Class: Insecta
- Order: Lepidoptera
- Family: Geometridae
- Tribe: Azelinini
- Genus: Pero
- Species: P. modestus

Binomial name
- Pero modestus Grossbeck, 1910

Species of moth

Pero modestus is a species of geometrid moth in the family Geometridae. It is found in North America.

The MONA or Hodges number for Pero modestus is 6759.
