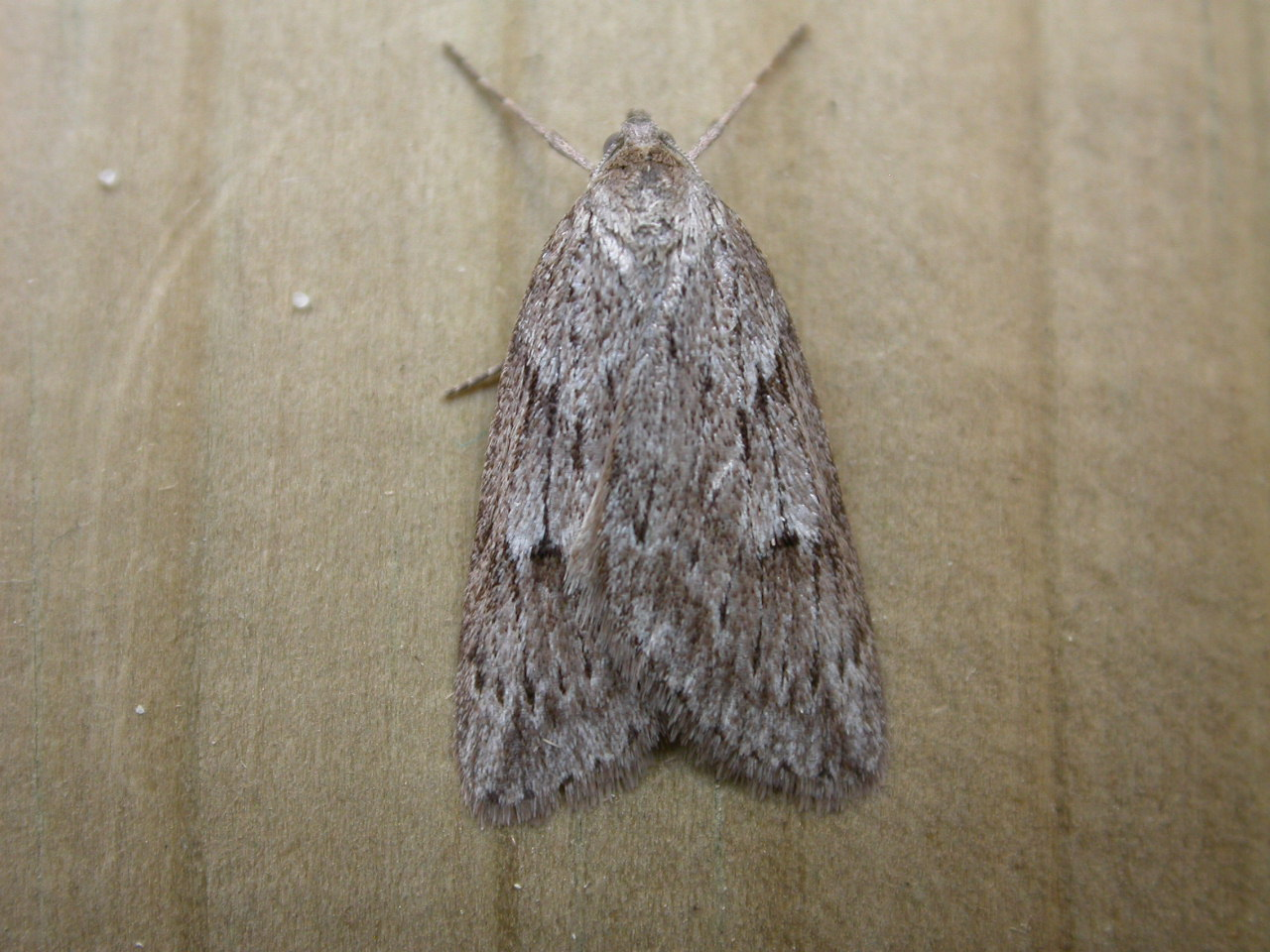

Scientific classification
- Kingdom: Animalia
- Phylum: Arthropoda
- Class: Insecta
- Order: Lepidoptera
- Family: Geometridae
- Genus: Pachycnemia
- Species: P. hippocastanaria

Binomial name
- Pachycnemia hippocastanaria (Hübner, 1799)

Synonyms
- Geometra hippocastanaria Hübner, 1799

= Pachycnemia hippocastanaria =

Species of moth

Pachycnemia hippocastanaria, the horse chestnut moth, is a moth of the family Geometridae. It is found in most of Europe.

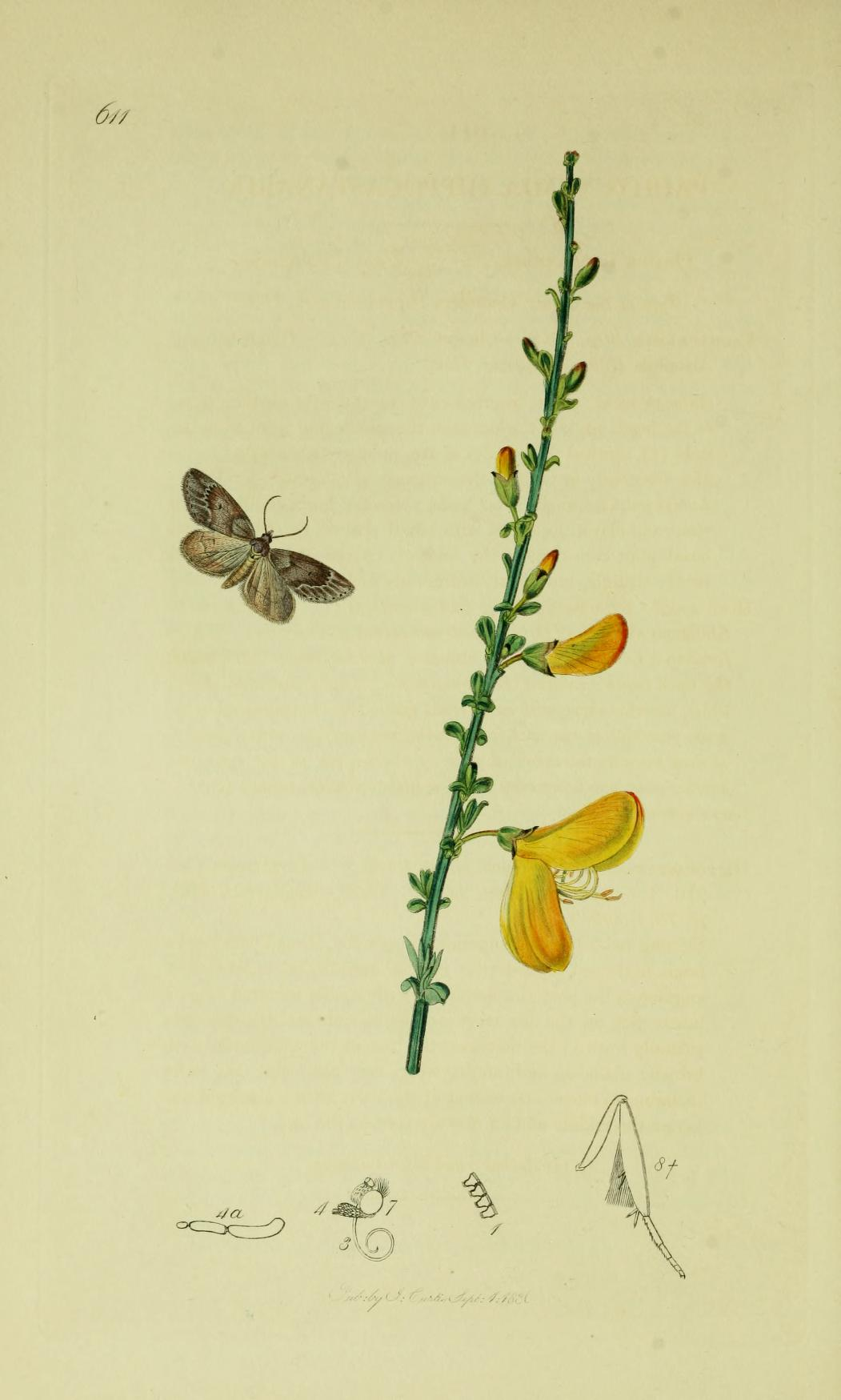
Illustration from John Curtis's British Entomology Volume 6

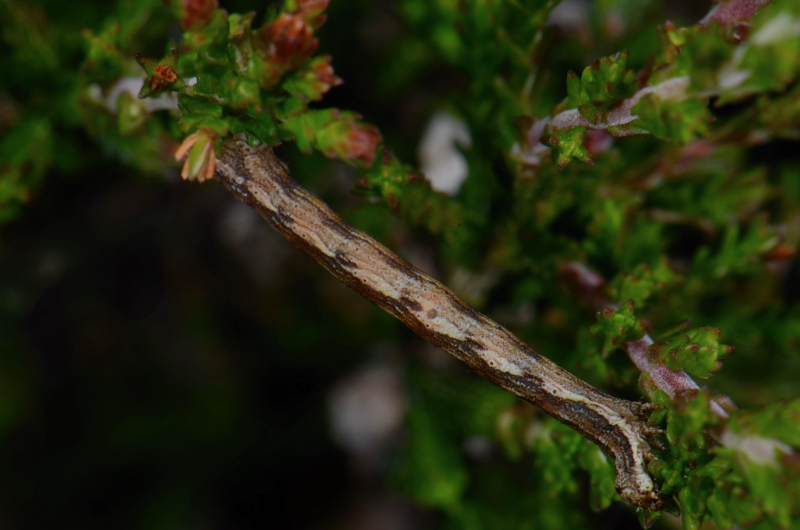
Larva

The wingspan is 28–32 mm. Adults are on wing from April to May, and again in a partial second generation in August, usually with fewer and smaller moths.
