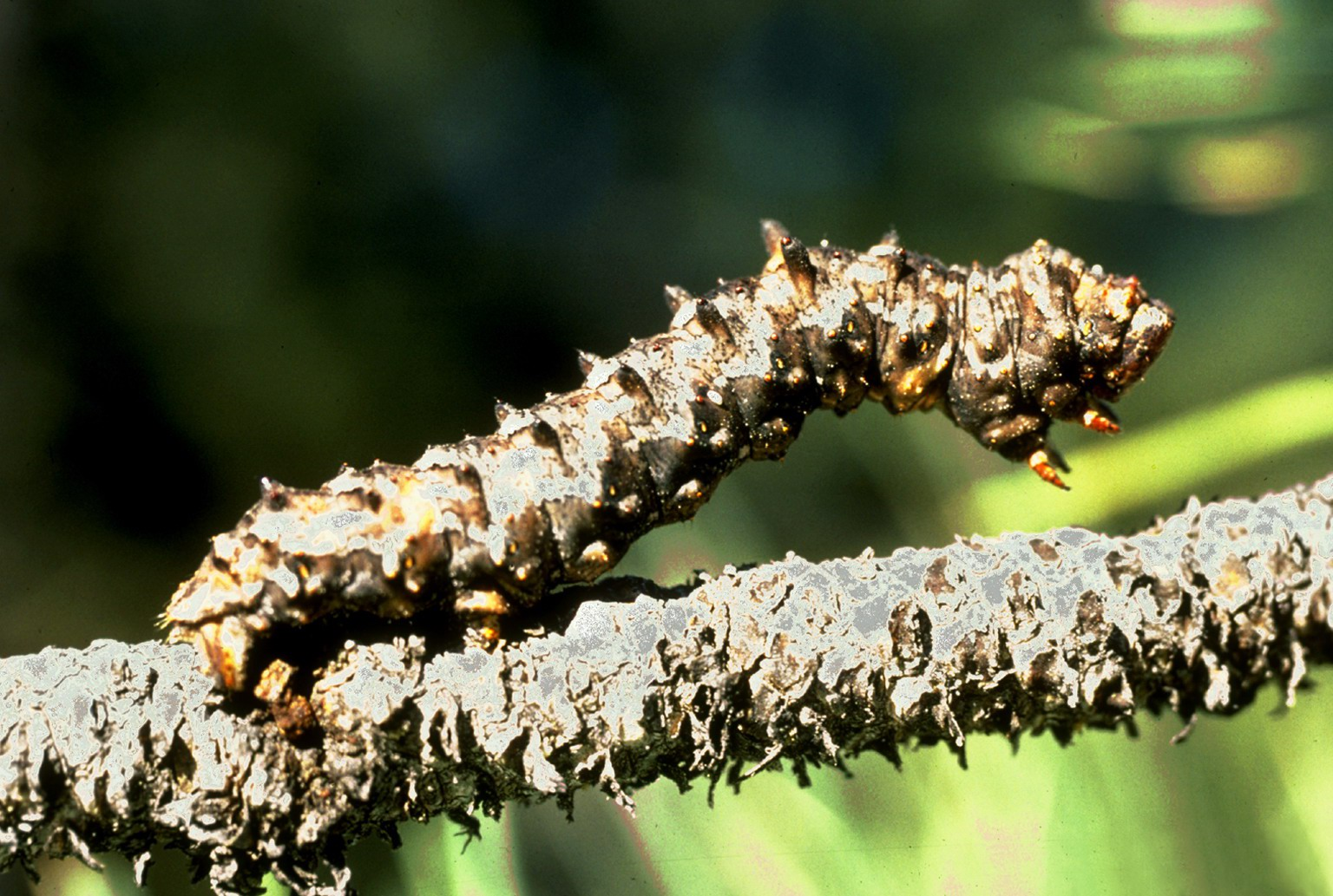
- Larva

Scientific classification
- Kingdom: Animalia
- Phylum: Arthropoda
- Class: Insecta
- Order: Lepidoptera
- Family: Geometridae
- Genus: Phaeoura
- Species: P. mexicanaria

Binomial name
- Phaeoura mexicanaria (Grote, 1883)

Synonyms
- Eubyja mexicanaria Grote, 1883; Nacophora mexicanaria; Phaeoura triaria Barnes & McDunnough, 1917; Phaeoura magnificans Dyar, 1923

= Phaeoura mexicanaria =

Species of moth

Phaeoura mexicanaria is a species of moth of the family Geometridae first described by Augustus Radcliffe Grote in 1883. It is found in North America, including British Columbia, California, Texas and Washington.

The wingspan is 40–50 mm.

The larvae feed on Pinus species.
