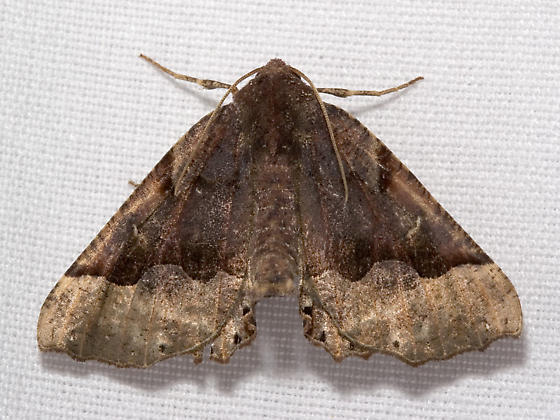

Scientific classification
- Kingdom: Animalia
- Phylum: Arthropoda
- Clade: Pancrustacea
- Class: Insecta
- Order: Lepidoptera
- Family: Geometridae
- Genus: Pero
- Species: P. ancetaria

Binomial name
- Pero ancetaria (Hübner, 1806)

Synonyms
- Pero hubneraria (Guenée, 1857); Azelina hubneraria Guenée, 1857; Pero marmoratus (Grossbeck, 1910); Pero huebneraria; Pero barnesi (Cassino & Swett, 1922)

= Pero ancetaria =

Species of moth

Pero ancetaria, or Hübner's pero, is a moth of the family Geometridae. The species was first described by Jacob Hübner in 1806. It is found in the eastern part of the United States, Ontario and Quebec.

The wingspan is 31–37 mm. Adults are on wing from March to September in the south (from May to June and again from August to September). There are two generations per year.

The larvae feed on Alnus, Shepherdia canadensis, Prunus serotina and Salix.
