= Pero inviolata =

Scientific classification
- Kingdom: Animalia
- Phylum: Arthropoda
- Class: Insecta
- Order: Lepidoptera
- Family: Geometridae
- Genus: Pero
- Species: P. inviolata

Binomial name
- Pero inviolata (Hulst, 1898)

Species of moth

Pero inviolata is a species of geometrid moth in the family Geometridae. It is found in North America.

The MONA or Hodges number for Pero inviolata is 6750.
