= Phaeoura cristifera =

Scientific classification
- Domain: Eukaryota
- Kingdom: Animalia
- Phylum: Arthropoda
- Class: Insecta
- Order: Lepidoptera
- Family: Geometridae
- Tribe: Nacophorini
- Genus: Phaeoura
- Species: P. cristifera

Binomial name
- Phaeoura cristifera Hulst, 1896

Species of moth

Phaeoura cristifera is a species of geometrid moth in the family Geometridae. It is found in North America. The scientific name of the species was first validly published in 1896 by Holly.

The MONA or Hodges number for Phaeoura cristifera is 6764.
