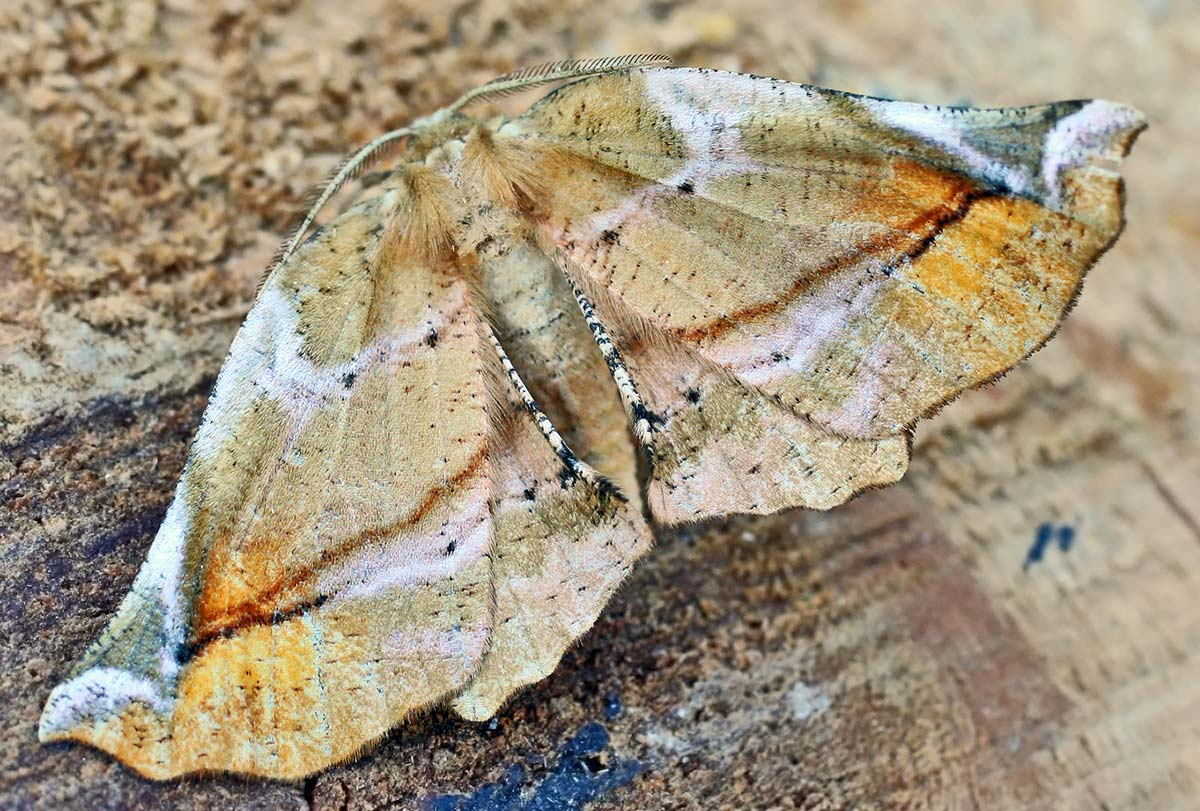

Scientific classification
- Kingdom: Animalia
- Phylum: Arthropoda
- Class: Insecta
- Order: Lepidoptera
- Family: Geometridae
- Tribe: Ennomini
- Genus: Apeira; Gistl, 1848

= Apeira =

Genus of geometer moths

Apeira is a genus of moths in the family Geometridae first described by Johannes von Nepomuk Franz Xaver Gistel in 1848.

== Species ==
- Apeira crenularia (Leech, 1897)
- Apeira ectocausta (Wehrli, 1935)
- Apeira latimarginaria (Leech, 1897)
- Apeira marmorataria (Leech, 1897)
- Apeira olivaria (Leech, 1897)
- Apeira productaria (Leech, 1897)
- Apeira syringaria (Linnaeus, 1758) – lilac beauty
- Apeira versicolor (Warren, 1894)
- Apeira viridescens (Warren, 1894)
