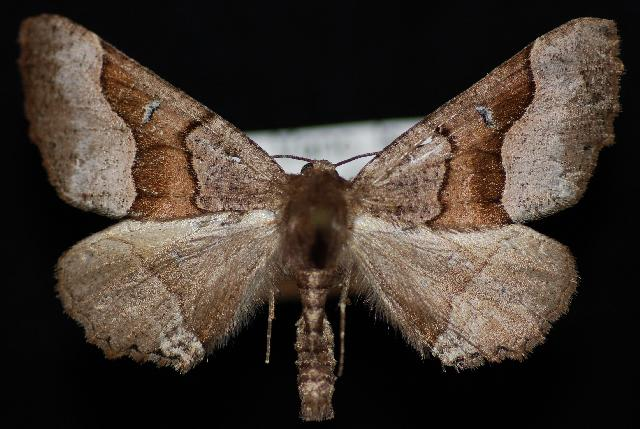

Scientific classification
- Kingdom: Animalia
- Phylum: Arthropoda
- Clade: Pancrustacea
- Class: Insecta
- Order: Lepidoptera
- Family: Geometridae
- Genus: Pero
- Species: P. behrensaria

Binomial name
- Pero behrensaria (Packard, 1871)

= Pero behrensaria =

Species of moth

Pero behrensaria, or Behr's pero, is a species of geometrid moth in the family Geometridae. It is found in North America.

The MONA or Hodges number for Pero behrensaria is 6760.

== Subspecies ==
These three subspecies belong to the species Pero behrensaria:

- Pero behrensaria behrensaria
- Pero behrensaria daulus Rindge, 1955
- Pero behrensaria sperryi Rindge, 1955
