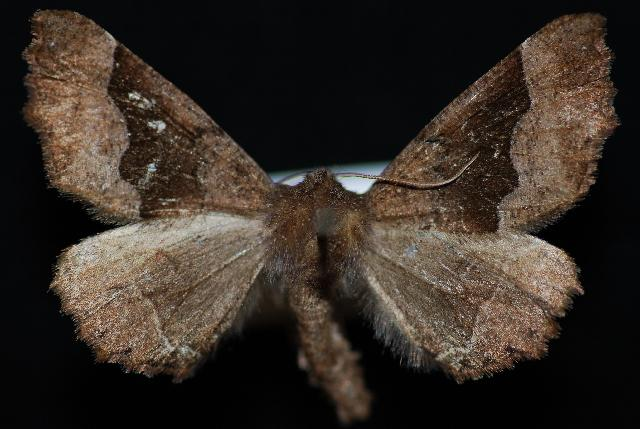

Scientific classification
- Domain: Eukaryota
- Kingdom: Animalia
- Phylum: Arthropoda
- Class: Insecta
- Order: Lepidoptera
- Family: Geometridae
- Genus: Pero
- Species: P. occidentalis

Binomial name
- Pero occidentalis (Hulst, 1896)

= Pero occidentalis =

Species of moth

Pero occidentalis, the western pero, is a species of geometrid moth in the family Geometridae. It was described by George Duryea Hulst in 1896 and is found in North America.

The MONA or Hodges number for Pero occidentalis is 6761.
