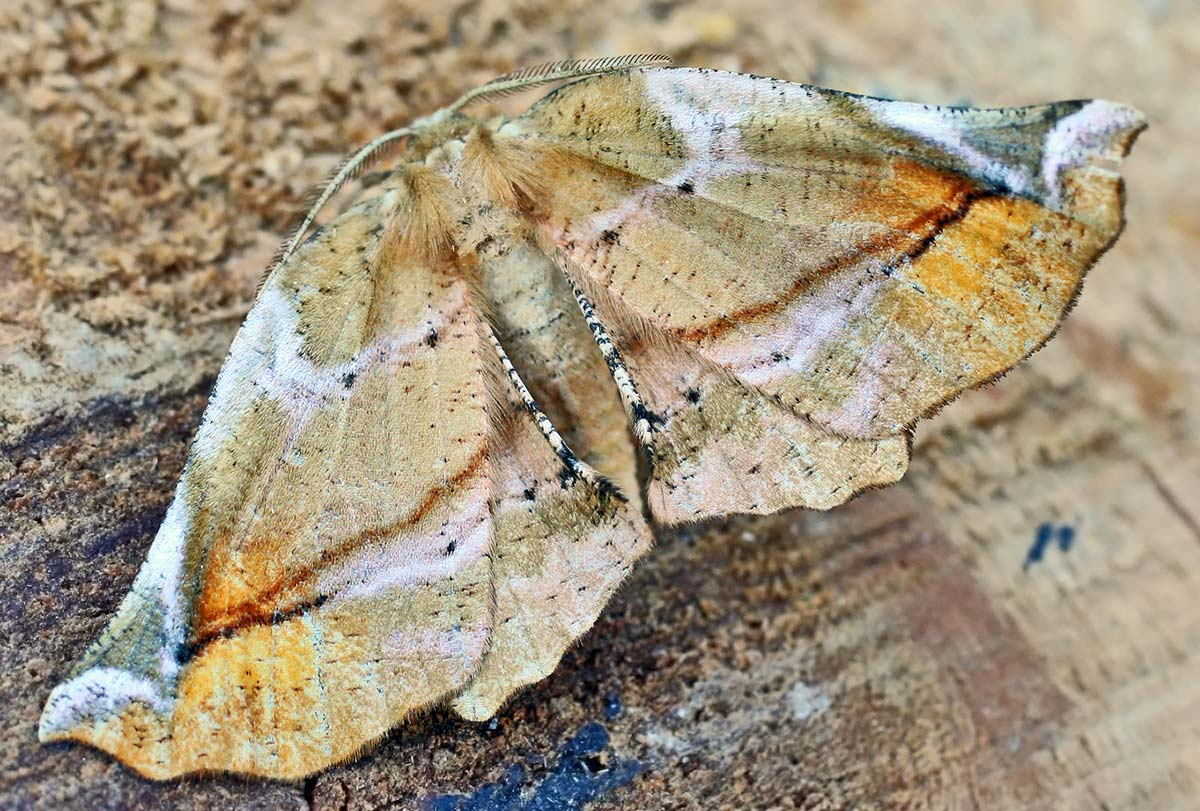

Scientific classification
- Kingdom: Animalia
- Phylum: Arthropoda
- Clade: Pancrustacea
- Class: Insecta
- Order: Lepidoptera
- Family: Geometridae
- Genus: Apeira
- Species: A. syringaria

Binomial name
- Apeira syringaria (Linnaeus, 1758)

= Apeira syringaria =

Species of moth

Apeira syringaria, the lilac beauty, is a moth of the family Geometridae. It is found throughout Europe and east across the Palearctic to the Russian Far East and Japan.

The wingspan is 38–42 mm. The length of the forewings is 19–22 mm. The front wings are coloured violet-grey to bright reddish brown and yellowish in the marginal field. There are white marks along the costa. The interior cross line is pinkish white and broken under the costa (toward the basal field). The narrow central band is red-brown and continues on the hindwings. The outer cross line is dark on the front edge becoming pink white adjoining on the hind wings a dark row of dots. A pink-white spot is located off the apex of the wing. In rest, the front margins of the wings are curiously folded. This, in combination with the colour and pattern give a crumpled leaf-like appearance.

The caterpillars reach a length of up to 30 millimeters. . On the seventh segment there is an eye-catching pair of curved extensions; smaller dorsal humps are located on segments five and six. They are pale ochre-coloured with dark olive-brown or purple-brown markings . The head capsule is grey-brown. In a resting position, the caterpillars do not sit stretched out like most other looper caterpillars, but remain curved to resemble the dried fruit capsules of the lilac.

The moth flies from June to July.

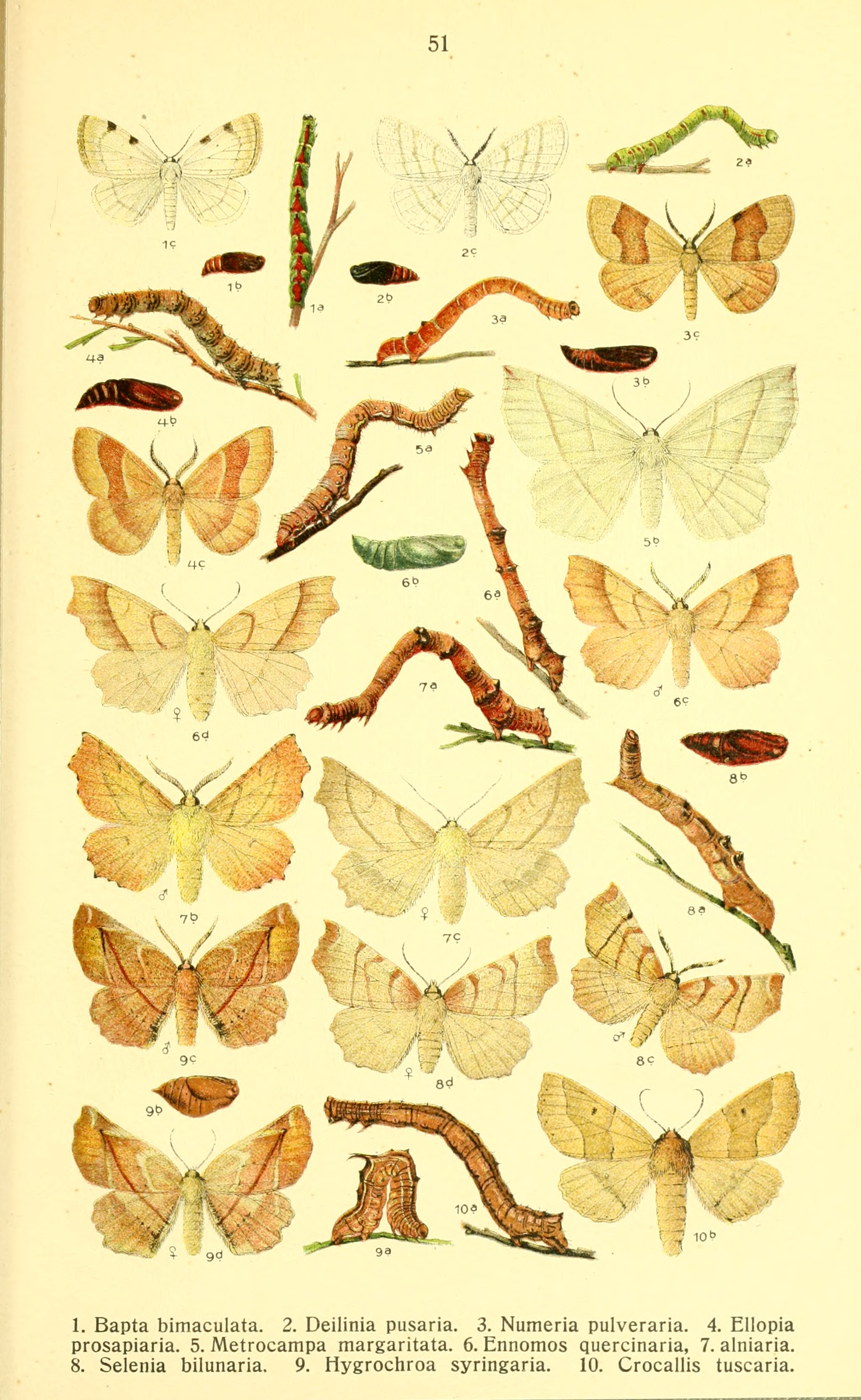
Figure 9 Male, female, larva and pupa in Die Schmetterlinge Deutschlands mit besonderer Berücksichtigung ihrer Biologie, Bd. 1-4, by Karl Eckstein

The caterpillars feed on lilac, honeysuckle and privet. This species overwinters as a larva.

Ecology: found in woodland, heaths and occasionally fens.

== Notes ==
1. The flight season refers to the British Isles. This may vary in other parts of the range.
