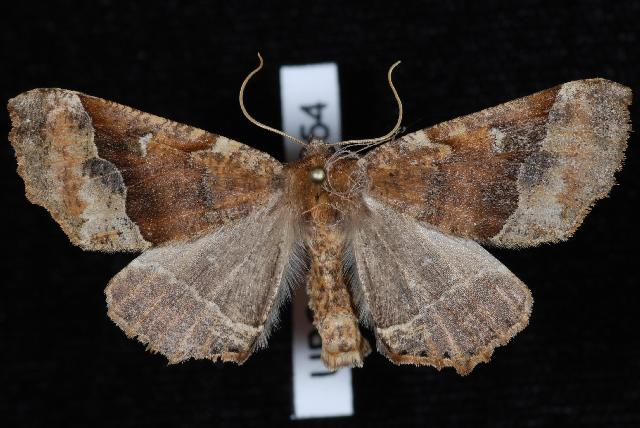
- Image of Pero morrisonaria

Scientific classification
- Kingdom: Animalia
- Phylum: Arthropoda
- Class: Insecta
- Order: Lepidoptera
- Family: Geometridae
- Genus: Pero
- Species: P. morrisonaria

Binomial name
- Pero morrisonaria H. Edwards, 1881

Synonyms
- Pero morrisonatus

= Pero morrisonaria =

Morrison's pero

Species of moth

Pero morrisonaria, or Morrison's pero, is a moth of the family Geometridae. The species was first described by Henry Edwards in 1881. It is found from Newfoundland to British Columbia, and coast to coast in the northern United States, south in the east to South Carolina, south in the west to California.

The wingspan is 34–40 mm. The moth flies from May to July depending on the location.
