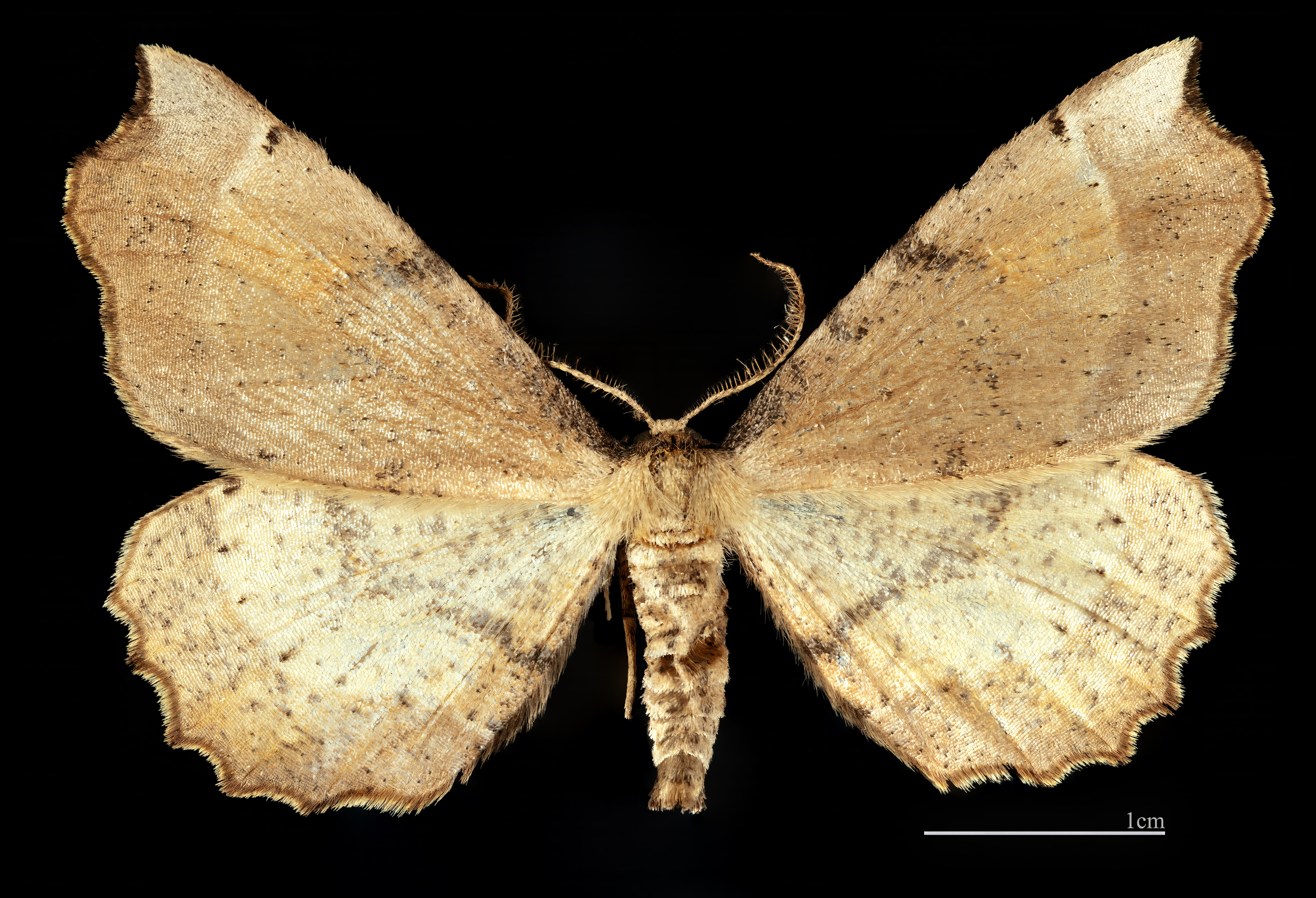
- Artiora evonymaria

Scientific classification
- Kingdom: Animalia
- Phylum: Arthropoda
- Class: Insecta
- Order: Lepidoptera
- Family: Geometridae
- Genus: Artiora; Meyrick, 1892
- Species: A. evonymaria

Binomial name
- Artiora evonymaria (Denis & Schiffermüller, 1775)

= Artiora =

Monotypic genus of geometer moths

Artiora is a monotypic genus of moths in the family Geometridae. Its sole species, Artiora evonymaria, occurs in Europe. Larvae of A. evonymaria are monophagous external feeders on leaves of European spindle (Euonymus europaeus).

== Taxonomy ==
Genus Artiora was erected by Edward Meyrick in 1892. Artiora evonymaria was first described in 1775 by Michael Denis and Ignaz Schiffermüller (as Geometra evonymaria). Within the Geometridae, it was previously placed incertae sedis within tribe Ennomini, but as a result of 2024 phylogenetic research has been transferred to Boarmiini.
