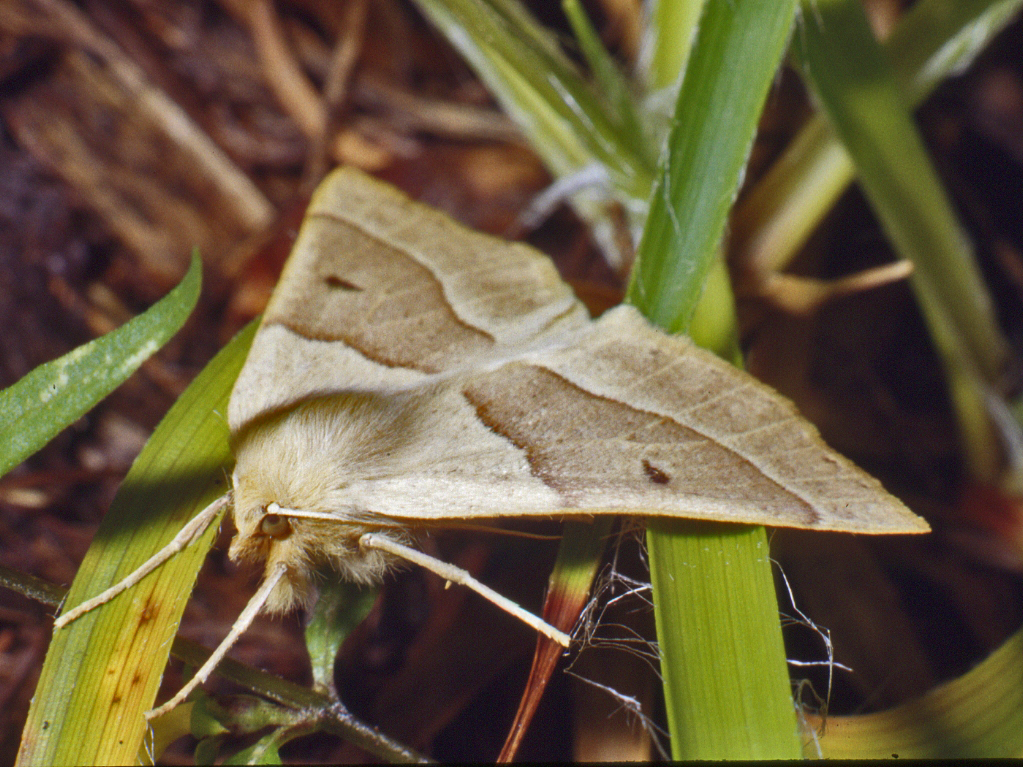
- Crocallis elinguaria

Scientific classification
- Domain: Eukaryota
- Kingdom: Animalia
- Phylum: Arthropoda
- Class: Insecta
- Order: Lepidoptera
- Family: Geometridae
- Tribe: Ennomini
- Genus: Crocallis; Treitschke, 1825

= Crocallis =

Genus of moths

Crocallis is a genus of moths in the family Geometridae erected by Georg Friedrich Treitschke in 1825.

== Species ==
- Crocallis albarracina Wehrli, 1940
- Crocallis auberti Oberthür, 1883
- Crocallis bacalladoi
- Crocallis boisduvaliaria (H. Lucas, 1849)
- Crocallis dardoinaria Donzel, 1840 – dusky scalloped oak
- Crocallis elinguaria (Linnaeus, 1758) – scalloped oak
- Crocallis friedrichi
- Crocallis inexpectata Warnecke, 1940
- Crocallis matillae
- Crocallis mirabica Brandt, 1941
- Crocallis pototskii Viidalepp, 1988
- Crocallis rjabovi Wehrli, 1936
- Crocallis tusciaria (Borkhausen, 1793)
