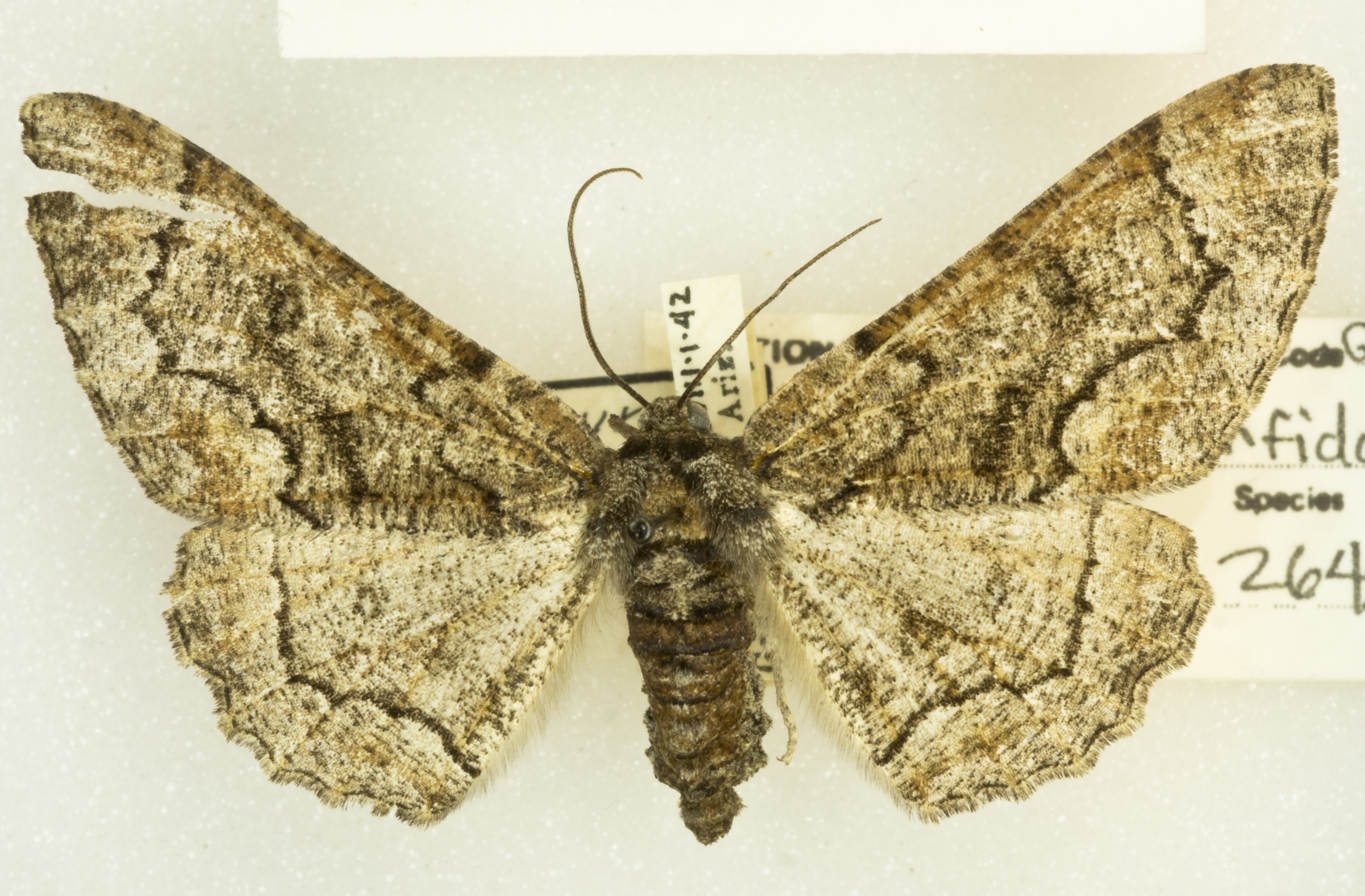

Scientific classification
- Kingdom: Animalia
- Phylum: Arthropoda
- Clade: Pancrustacea
- Class: Insecta
- Order: Lepidoptera
- Family: Geometridae
- Genus: Phaeoura
- Species: P. perfidaria

Binomial name
- Phaeoura perfidaria Barnes & McDunnough, 1917

Synonyms
- Nacophora pefidaria

= Phaeoura perfidaria =

Species of moth

Phaeoura perfidaria is a species of moth in the family Geometridae (geometrid moths). It was described by William Barnes and James Halliday McDunnough in 1917 and is found in North America, where it has been recorded from Arizona, California, Colorado and New Mexico.

The wingspan is 40–47 mm.

The MONA or Hodges number for Phaeoura perfidaria is 6768.
