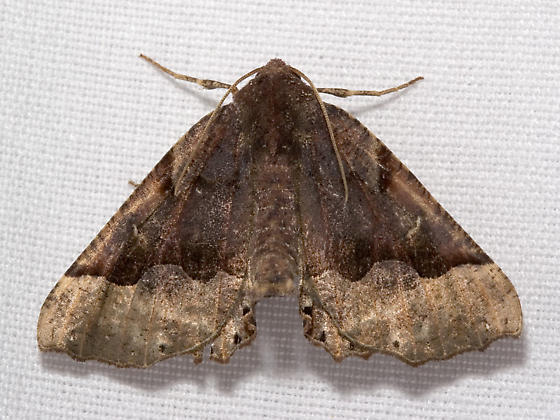
- Pero ancetaria

Scientific classification
- Kingdom: Animalia
- Phylum: Arthropoda
- Clade: Pancrustacea
- Class: Insecta
- Order: Lepidoptera
- Family: Geometridae
- Tribe: Azelinini
- Genus: Pero; Herrich-Schäffer, 1855

Synonyms
- Azelina Guenée, 1857; Azelinopsis Warren, 1896; Egabra Walker, 1858; Eusenea Walker, 1860; Marmarea Hulst, 1896; Meticulodes Guenée, 1857; Pergama Herrich-Schäffer, 1855; Stenodonta Warren, 1905; Stenaspilates Packard, 1876

= Pero (moth) =

Genus of moths

Pero is a genus of moths in the family Geometridae. It was erected by Gottlieb August Wilhelm Herrich-Schäffer in 1855.

== Species ==
In alphabetical order:

- Pero aeniasaria (Walker, 1860)
- Pero ancetaria (Hübner, 1806)
- Pero astapa (Druce, 1892)
- Pero behrensaria (Packard, 1871)
- Pero catalina Poole, 1987
- Pero flavisaria (Grossbeck, 1906)
- Pero gigantea (Grossbeck, 1910)
- Pero hoedularia (Guenée, 1857)
- Pero honestaria (Walker, 1860)
- Pero hubneraria (Guenée, 1857)
- Pero inviolata (Hulst, 1898)
- Pero macdunnoughi (Cassino & Swett, 1922)
- Pero meskaria (Packard, 1876)
- Pero mizon (Rindge, 1955)
- Pero modesta (Grossbeck, 1910)
- Pero modestus Grossbeck, 1910
- Pero morrisonaria (H. Edwards, 1881)
- Pero muzoides Herbulot, 2002
- Pero nerisaria (Walker, 1860)
- ?Pero obfuscata (Warren, 1894)
- Pero occidentalis (Hulst, 1896)
- Pero pima Poole, 1987
- Pero polygonaria (Herrich-Schäffer, [1855])
- Pero radiosaria (Hulst, 1886)
- Pero rectisectaria (Herrich-Schäffer, [1855])
- Pero spongiata (Guenée, 1857)
- Pero zalissaria (Walker, 1860)
