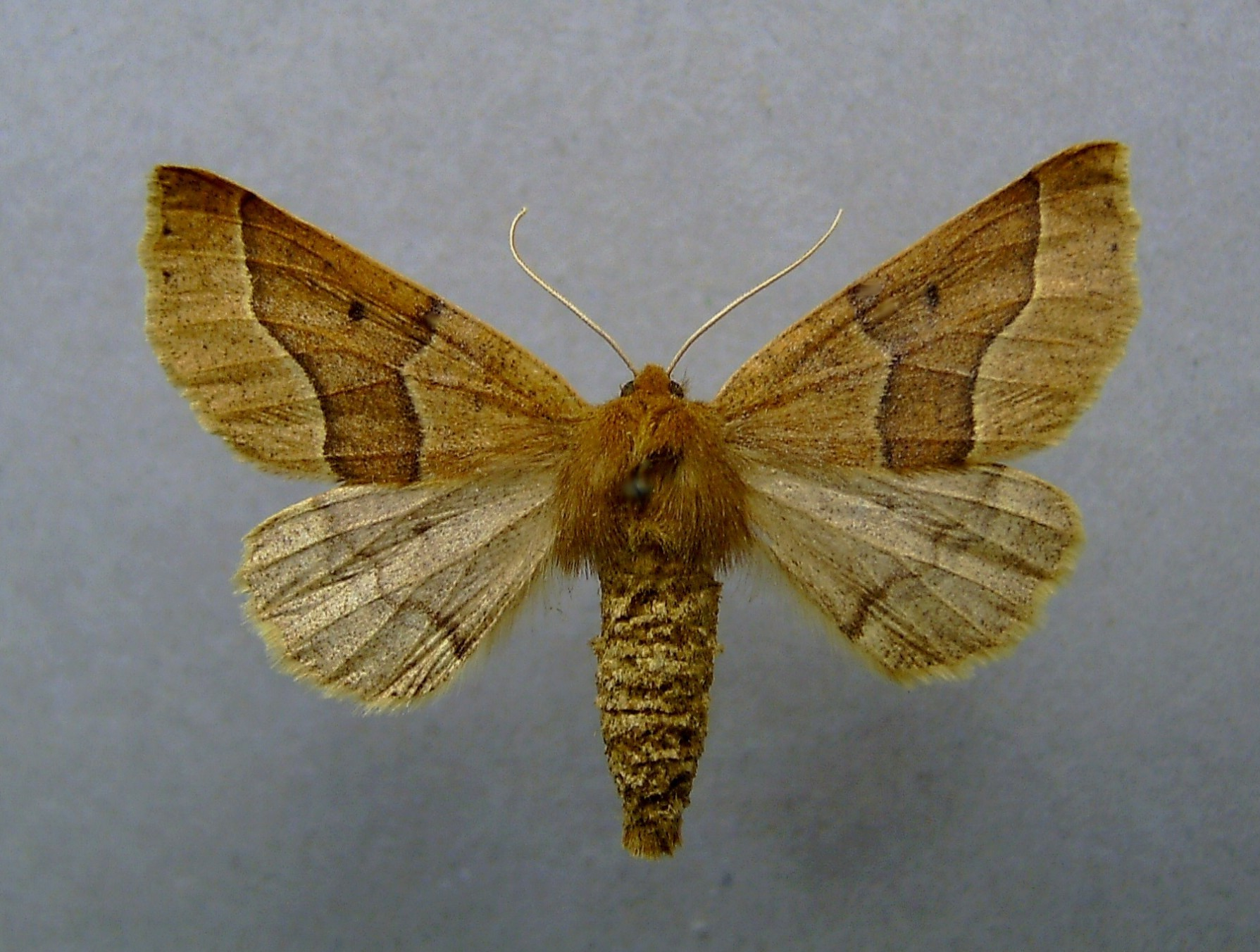

Scientific classification
- Domain: Eukaryota
- Kingdom: Animalia
- Phylum: Arthropoda
- Class: Insecta
- Order: Lepidoptera
- Family: Geometridae
- Genus: Crocallis
- Species: C. tusciaria

Binomial name
- Crocallis tusciaria (Borkhausen, 1793)

Synonyms
- Phalaena tusciaria Borkhausen 1793; Crocallis taurica Wehrli, 1934

= Crocallis tusciaria =

Species of moth

Crocallis tusciaria, the smoky scalloped oak, is a species of moth of the family Geometridae. It is found from Morocco through southern Europe and Asia Minor to the Caucasus, northern Iran and Turkmenistan. The eastern range extends to the southern Ural.

The wingspan is 31–40 mm. Adults are on wing from August to October in one generation per year.

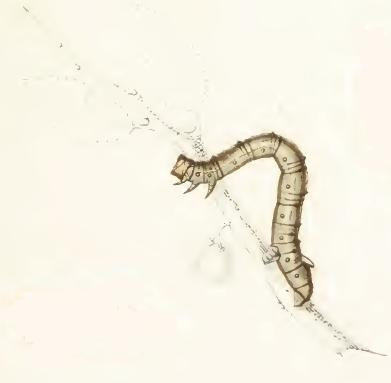
Larva

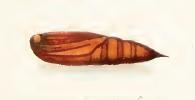
Pupa

The larvae feed on the leaves of various plants, including Prunus spinosa, Clematis vitalba, Crataegus, Frangula alnus and Berberis vulgaris. Larvae can be found from May to June. The species overwinters as an egg.

== Subspecies ==
- Crocallis tusciaria tusciaria
- Crocallis tusciaria taurica Wehrli, 1934
