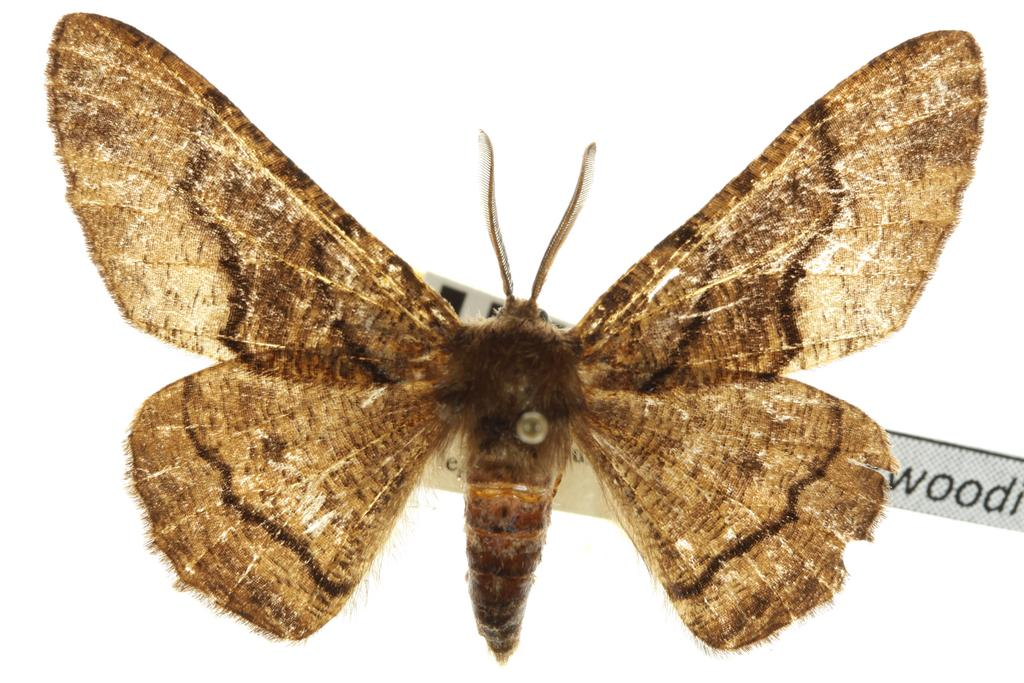

Scientific classification
- Kingdom: Animalia
- Phylum: Arthropoda
- Clade: Pancrustacea
- Class: Insecta
- Order: Lepidoptera
- Family: Geometridae
- Tribe: Nacophorini
- Genus: Phaeoura
- Species: P. kirkwoodi

Binomial name
- Phaeoura kirkwoodi Rindge, 1961

= Phaeoura kirkwoodi =

Species of moth

Phaeoura kirkwoodi is a species of geometrid moth in the family Geometridae. It is found in North America.
