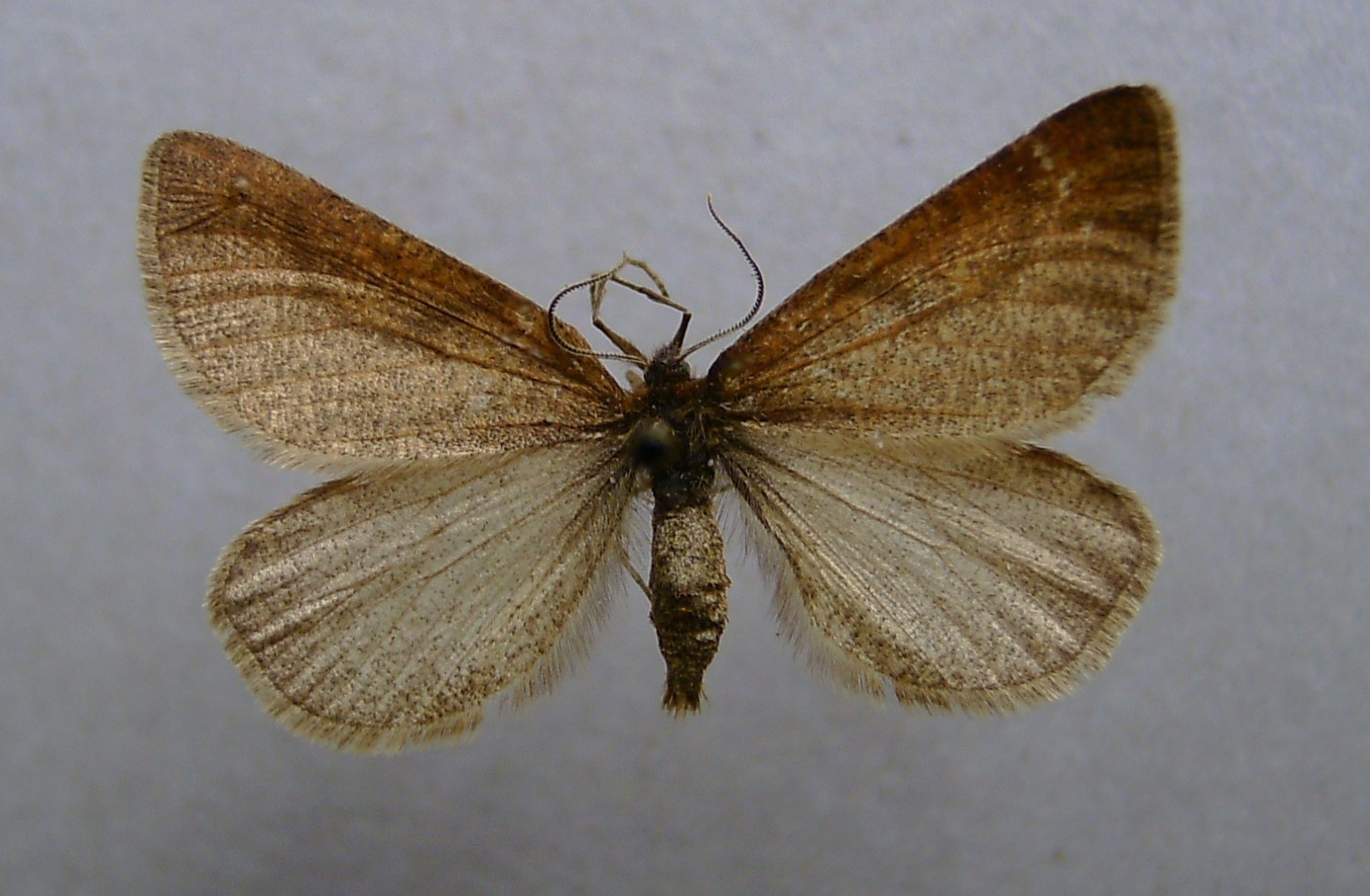

Scientific classification
- Kingdom: Animalia
- Phylum: Arthropoda
- Clade: Pancrustacea
- Class: Insecta
- Order: Lepidoptera
- Family: Geometridae
- Genus: Lignyoptera
- Species: L. fumidaria

Binomial name
- Lignyoptera fumidaria (Hübner, 1825)

Synonyms
- Geometra fumidaria Hubner, 1825; Lignyoptera fumidaria nausearia Krulikowski, 1906

= Lignyoptera fumidaria =

Species of moth

Lignyoptera fumidaria is a species of moth of the family Geometridae first described by Jacob Hübner in 1825. It is found in eastern Austria, Hungary, Bulgaria and eastern Russia.

The wingspan is 27–30 mm for males. Females have reduced wings. Adults are on wing from October to December.

In captivity the larvae have been recorded feeding on Achillea millerfolium, Galatella linosyris, Centaurea scabiosa, Salvia pratensis, Plantago and Inula species. The species overwinters as an egg.
