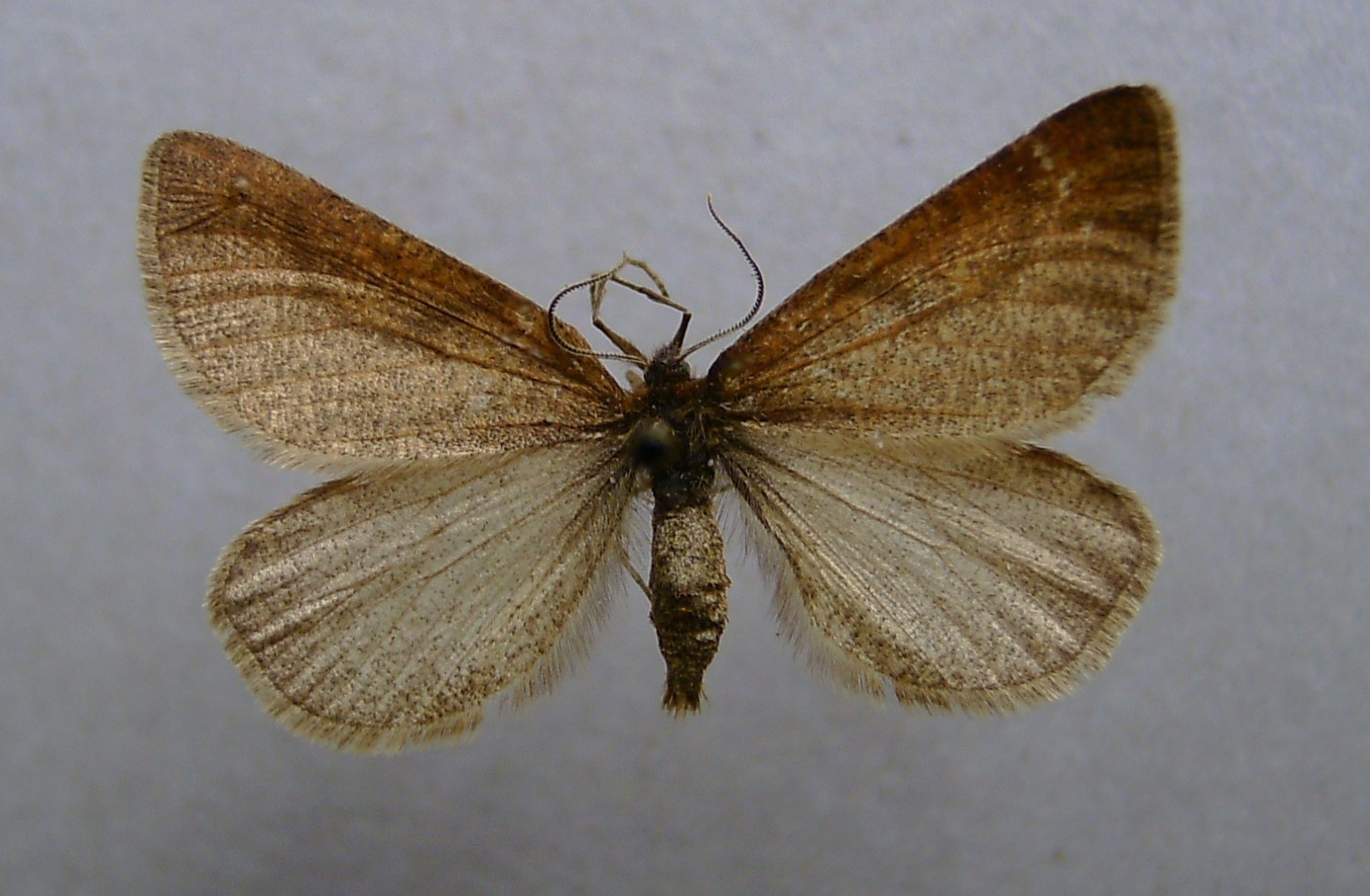

Scientific classification
- Domain: Eukaryota
- Kingdom: Animalia
- Phylum: Arthropoda
- Class: Insecta
- Order: Lepidoptera
- Family: Geometridae
- Subfamily: Ennominae
- Genus: Lignyoptera; Lederer, 1853

= Lignyoptera =

Genus of moths

Lignyoptera is a genus of moths in the family Geometridae described by Julius Lederer in 1853.

== Species ==
- Lignyoptera fumidaria (Hübner, 1825)
- Lignyoptera thaumastaria (Rebel, 1901), last seen in Montenegro in 1982, was rediscovered in Bosnia and Herzegovina in 2023.
