= Stenaspilatodes =

Scientific classification
- Kingdom: Animalia
- Phylum: Arthropoda
- Class: Insecta
- Order: Lepidoptera
- Family: Geometridae
- Tribe: Gnophini
- Genus: Stenaspilatodes; Franclemont & Poole, 1972
- Species: S. antidiscaria

Binomial name
- Stenaspilatodes antidiscaria (Walker, 1863)

Synonyms
- Stenaspilatodes lentaria (Hulst, 1886)

Genus of moths

Stenaspilatodes is a monotypic moth genus in the family Geometridae described by John G. Franclemont and Robert W. Poole in 1972. Its only species, Stenaspilatodes antidiscaria, described by Francis Walker in 1863, is found in the southeastern United States.
