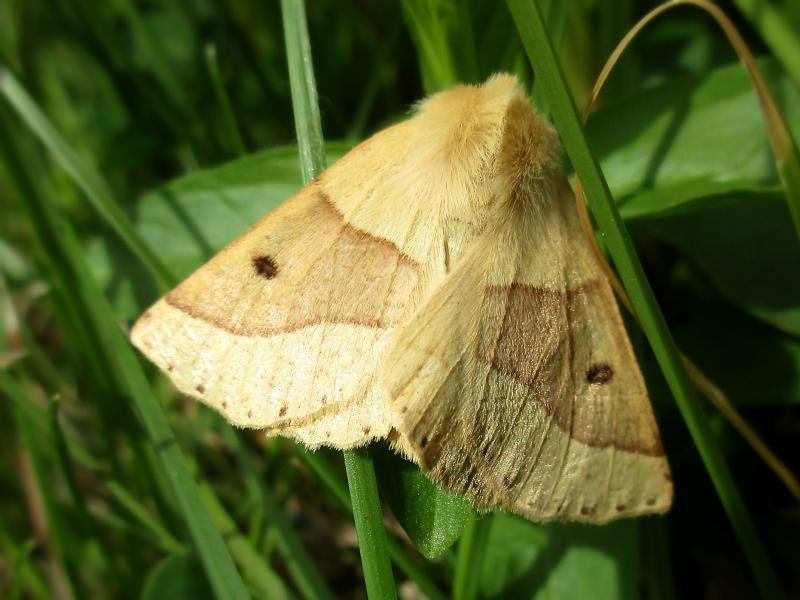
- Dorsal view
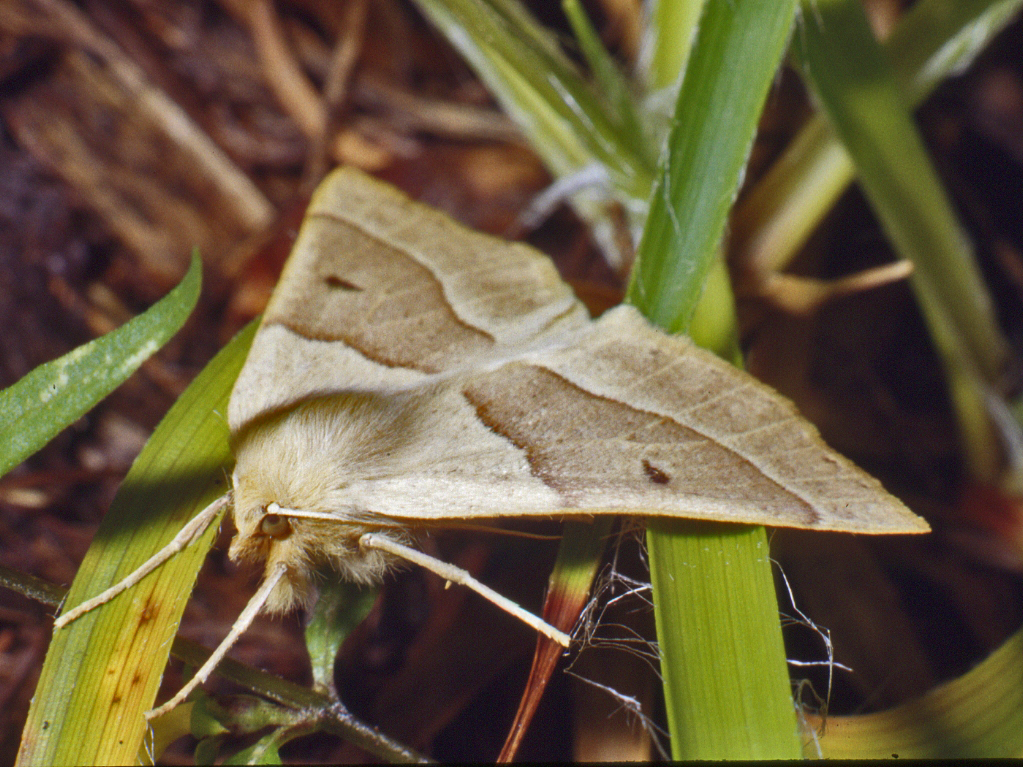
- Lateral view

Scientific classification
- Kingdom: Animalia
- Phylum: Arthropoda
- Class: Insecta
- Order: Lepidoptera
- Family: Geometridae
- Genus: Crocallis
- Species: C. elinguaria

Binomial name
- Crocallis elinguaria (Linnaeus, 1758)

= Scalloped oak =

Species of moth

The scalloped oak (Crocallis elinguaria) is a moth of the family Geometridae. The species was first described by Carl Linnaeus in his 1758 10th edition of Systema Naturae.

== Distribution ==
This common species can be found from Europe to eastern Siberia.

== Habitat ==
This species inhabits a wide range of habitats, including mixed and deciduous forests, bushes, heaths, scrub, hedgerows, bogs, parks and gardens.

== Description ==
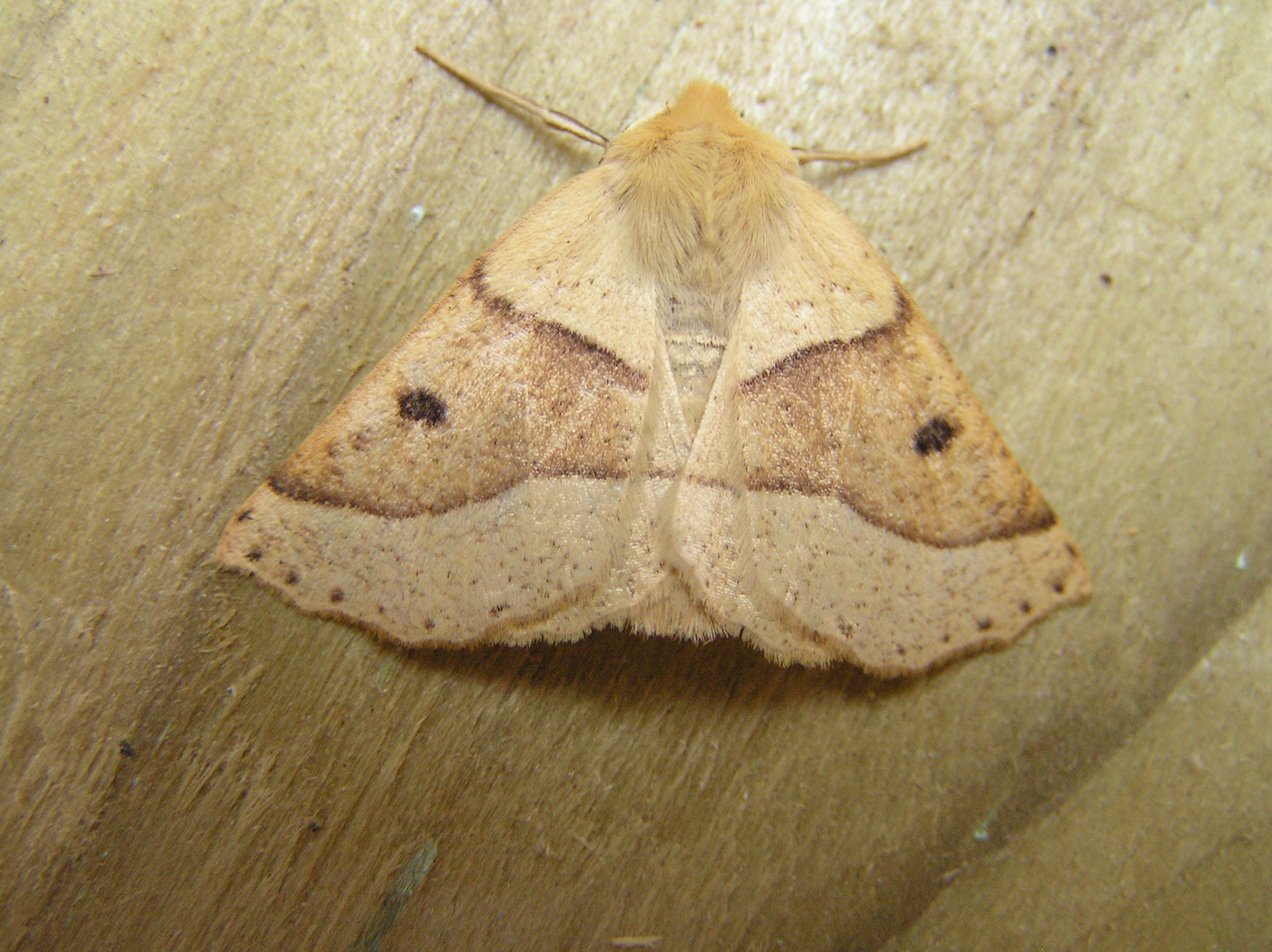

The wingspan is 32–46 mm. This is a distinctive species, usually with yellow-tan forewings with a broad orange-brown band and a pointed apex. Females are usually paler. There can be considerable variation, with the central band sometimes the same colour as the rest of the forewing, ranging from pale yellow to orange brown. Melanic forms are also known. There is always a blackish discal spot on the forewing in middle of band towards the costa. The thorax is hairy. The hindwings are plain whitish. Last instar caterpillars have a brownish or yellowish colouration. On the dorsum there is a dark brown line which is extended at the segment incisions. There are sometimes some dark spots or slashes on the sides. Characteristic are two small pointed warts on the eleventh segment. This species is rather similar to Crocallis albarracina. Prout describes some forma

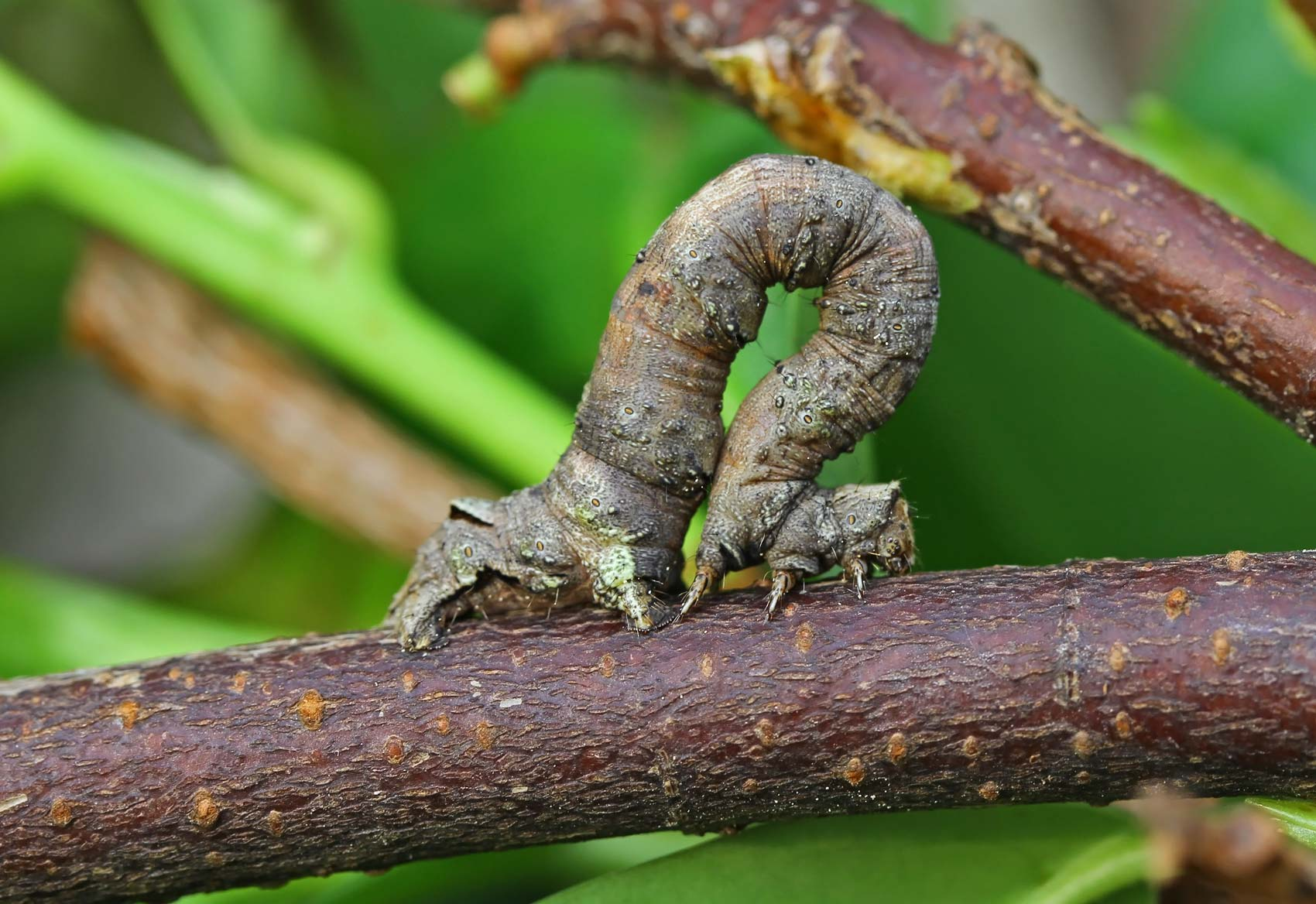
Larva

== Biology ==
It is an univoltine species. The adults fly at night from July to September and are attracted to light, sometimes in large numbers. The larva, grey and twig like, feeds on various trees and shrubs (see list below) and is omnivorous and cannibalistic, feeding also on smaller larvae. The species overwinters as an egg.

1. The flight season refers to the British Isles. This may vary in other parts of the range.

== Recorded food plants ==
Recorded host plants include:

- Alnus - alder
- Betula - birch
- Calluna - heather
- Corylus - common hazel
- Crataegus
- Lonicera - honeysuckle
- Populus - aspen (Populus tremula)
- Prunus - bird cherry (Prunus spinosa, Prunus domestica)
- Quercus
- Rhamnus - buckthorn
- Ribes - currant
- Rosa - rose
- Rubus - raspberry
- Salix - willow
- Sorbus - rowan
- Syringa - common lilac
- Tilia - lime
- Vaccinium

== Bibliography ==
- Chinery, Michael Collins Guide to the Insects of Britain and Western Europe 1986 (Reprinted 1991)
- Skinner, Bernard Colour Identification Guide to Moths of the British Isles 1984
