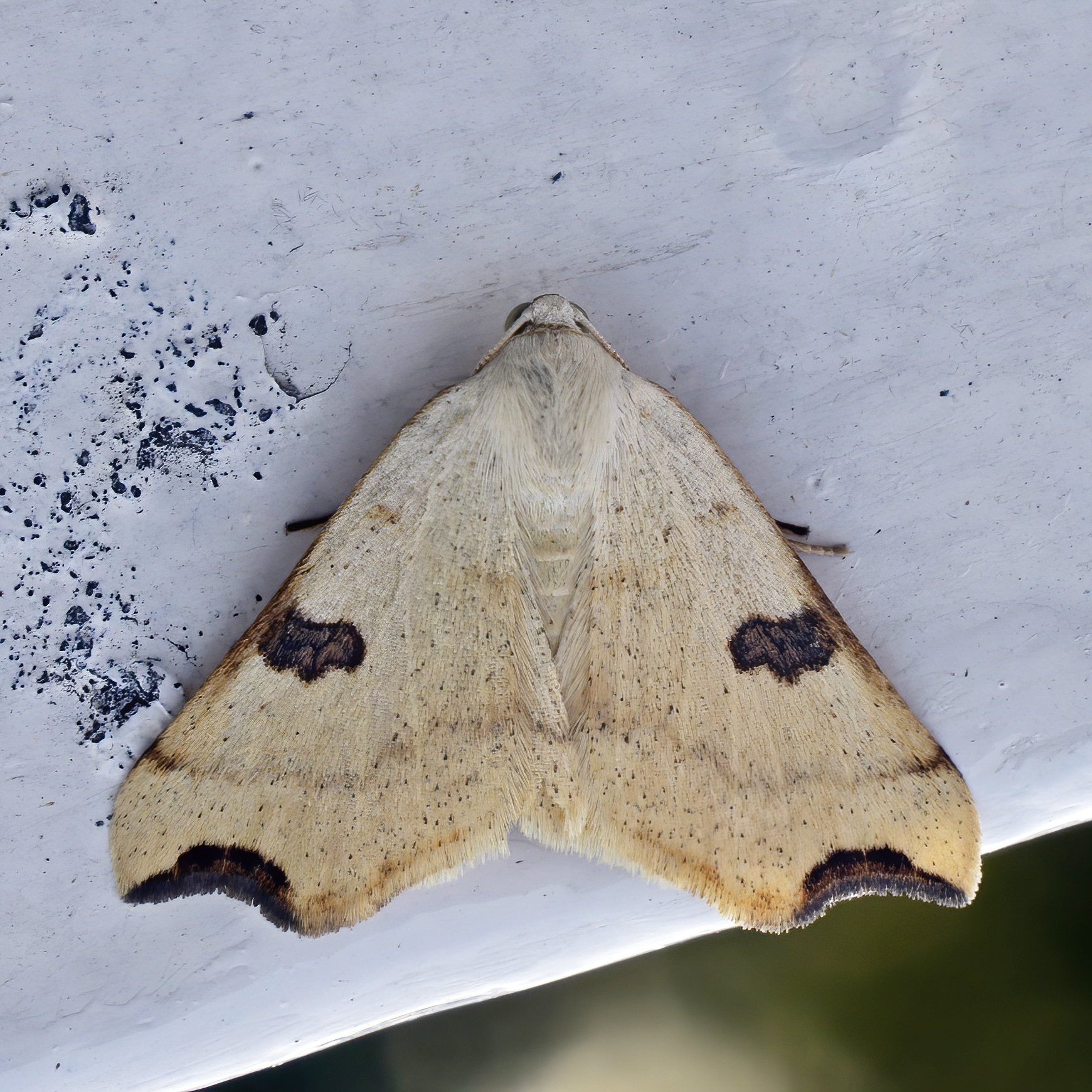
- E. cordiaria Danube delta, Romania

Scientific classification
- Kingdom: Animalia
- Phylum: Arthropoda
- Clade: Pancrustacea
- Class: Insecta
- Order: Lepidoptera
- Family: Geometridae
- Genus: Eilicrinia; Hübner, [1823]

= Eilicrinia =

Genus of moths

Eilicrinia is a genus of moths in the family Geometridae.

== Species ==
- Eilicrinia cordiaria (Hübner, 1790)
- Eilicrinia flava (Moore, 1888)
- Eilicrinia nuptalis (Bremer, 1864)
- Eilicrinia orias Wehrli, 1931
- Eilicrinia subcordiaria (Herrich-Schäffer, 1852)
- Eilicrinia trinotata (Metzner, 1845)
- Eilicrinia unimacularia Püngeler, 1914
- Eilicrinia wehrlii Djakonov, 1938
