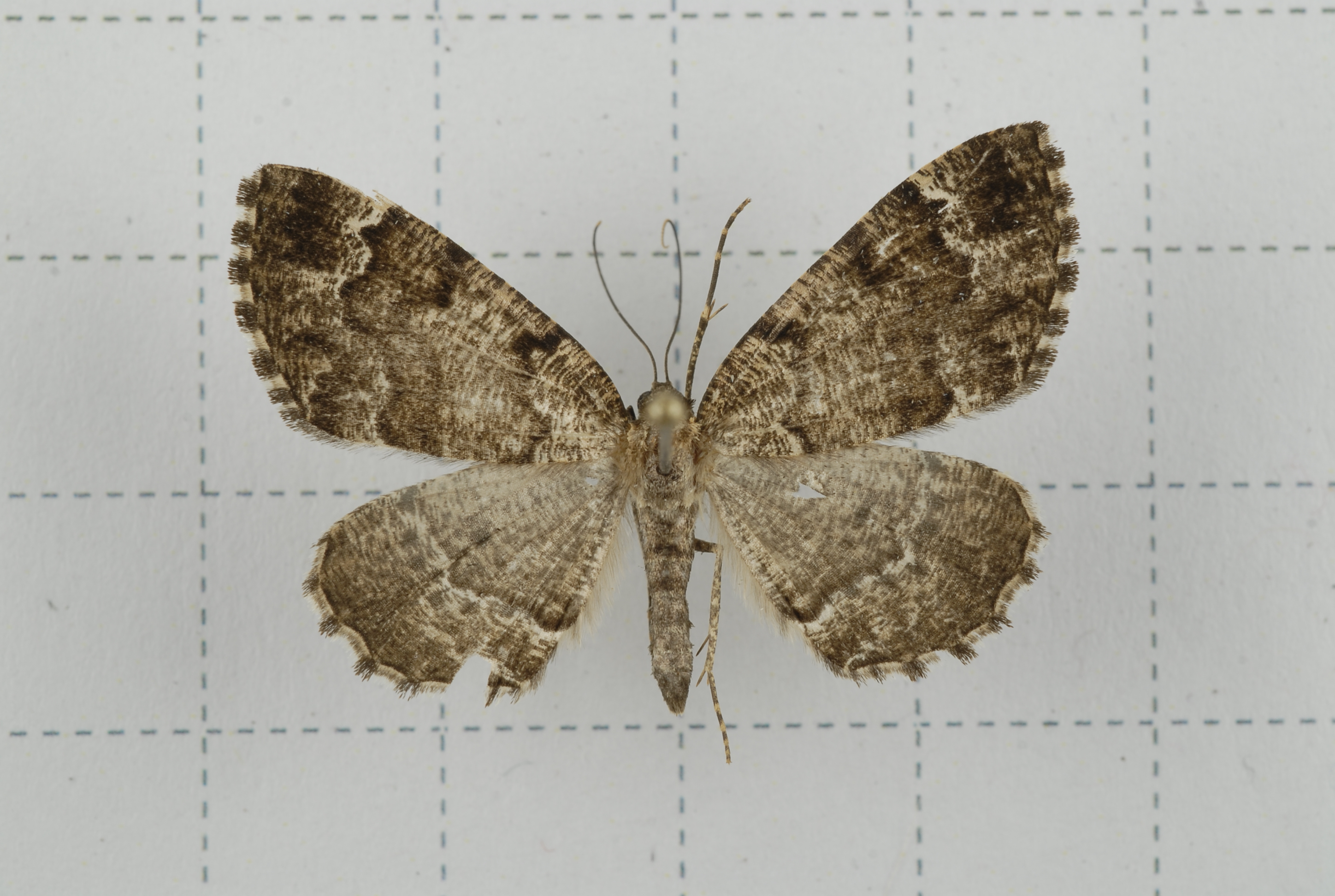

Scientific classification
- Kingdom: Animalia
- Phylum: Arthropoda
- Class: Insecta
- Order: Lepidoptera
- Family: Geometridae
- Genus: Scionomia; Warren, 1901

Synonyms
- Xandramella Matsumura, 1911

= Scionomia =

Genus of moths

Scionomia is a genus of moths in the family Geometridae found in Asia.

== Species ==
- Scionomia anomala (Butler, 1881)
- Scionomia lignicolor (Warren, 1893)
- Scionomia mendica (Butler, 1879)
- Scionomia parasinuosa (Inoue, 1982)
- Scionomia praeditaria (Leech, 1897)
- Scionomia sinuosa (Wileman, 1910)
- Scionomia solitaria Yazaki, 1992
