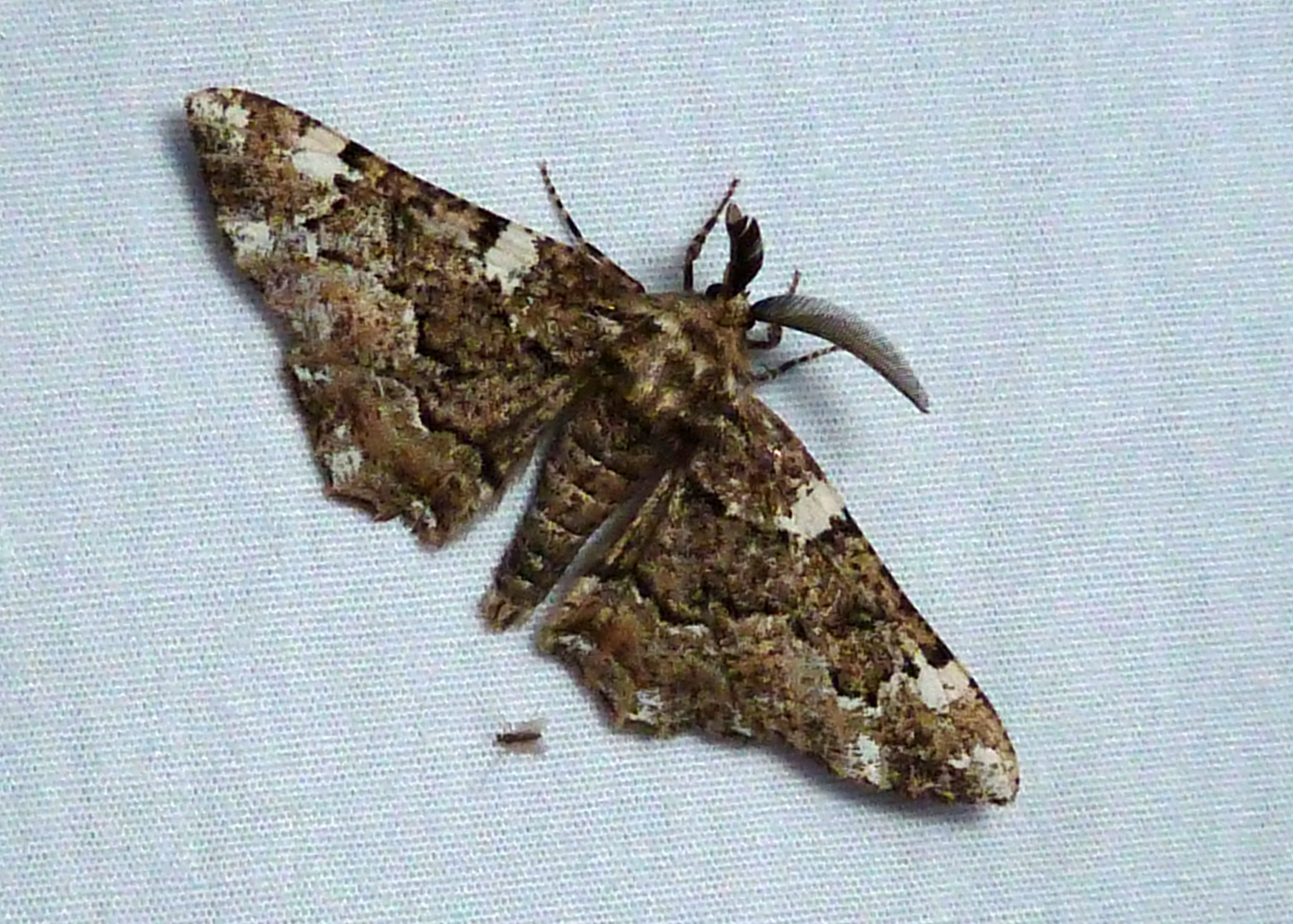

Scientific classification
- Domain: Eukaryota
- Kingdom: Animalia
- Phylum: Arthropoda
- Class: Insecta
- Order: Lepidoptera
- Family: Geometridae
- Genus: Phaeoura
- Species: P. quernaria

Binomial name
- Phaeoura quernaria (J. E. Smith, 1797)

Synonyms
- Phalaena quernaria J. E. Smith, 1797; Nacophora quernaria

= Phaeoura quernaria =

Species of moth

Phaeoura quernaria, the oak beauty, is a moth of the family Geometridae. The species was first described by James Edward Smith in 1797. It is found in eastern North America, occurring as far west as east-central Alberta. The habitat consists of aspen-cherry shrubland.

The wingspan is 37–56 mm. Adults are on wing from February to October in the southern part of the range, where two generations per year occur.

The larvae feed on various hardwood trees, including Betula papyrifera, Salix, Populus and Prunus species. They are grey to brown or greenish. Larvae can be found from June to October. The species overwinters in the pupal stage.
