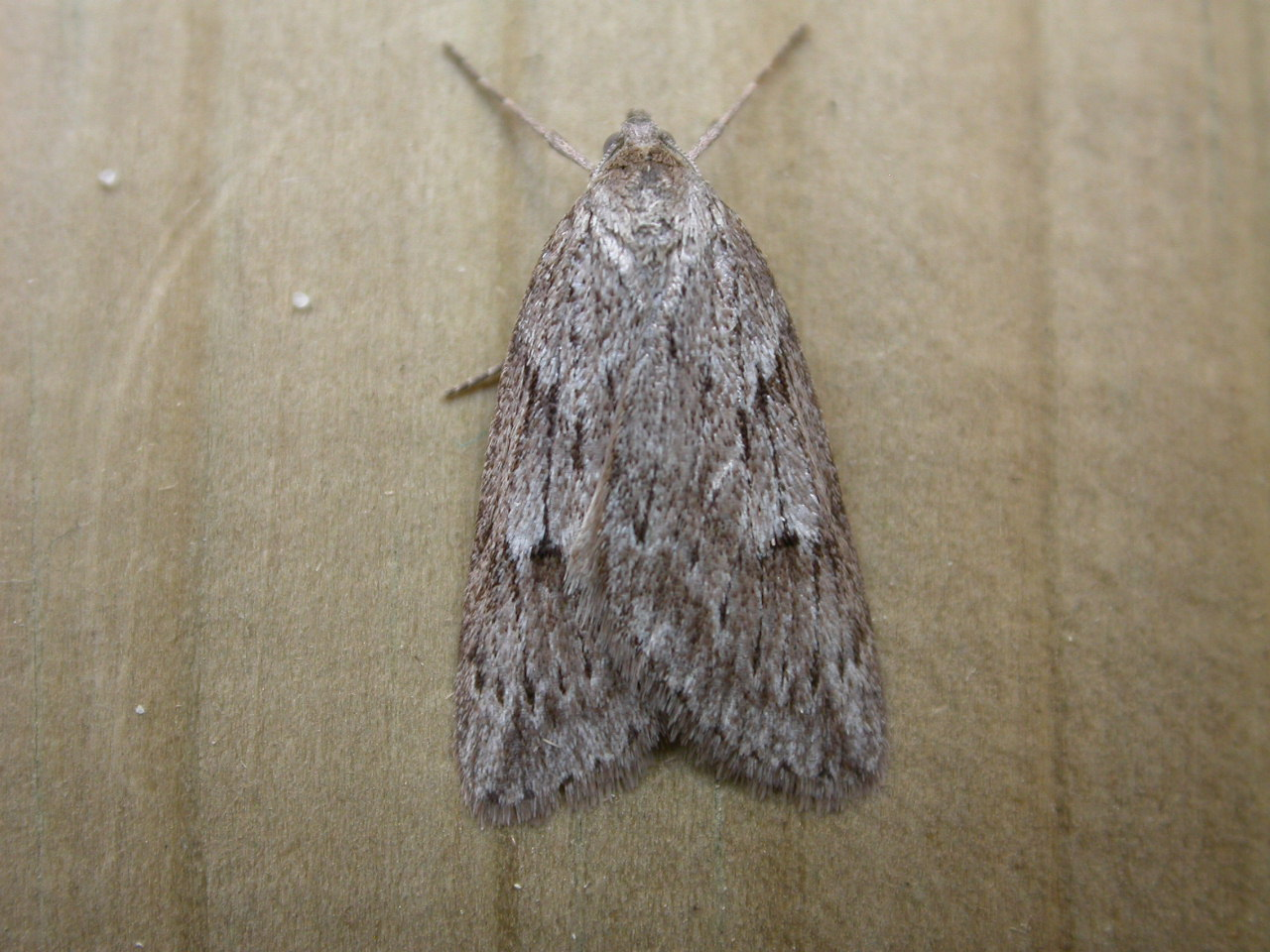

Scientific classification
- Kingdom: Animalia
- Phylum: Arthropoda
- Class: Insecta
- Order: Lepidoptera
- Family: Geometridae
- Subfamily: Ennominae
- Genus: Pachycnemia; Stephens, 1829

= Pachycnemia =

Genus of moths

Pachycnemia is a genus of moths in the family Geometridae erected by James Francis Stephens in 1829.

== Species ==
- Pachycnemia benesignata
- Pachycnemia hippocastanaria
- Pachycnemia tibiaria
