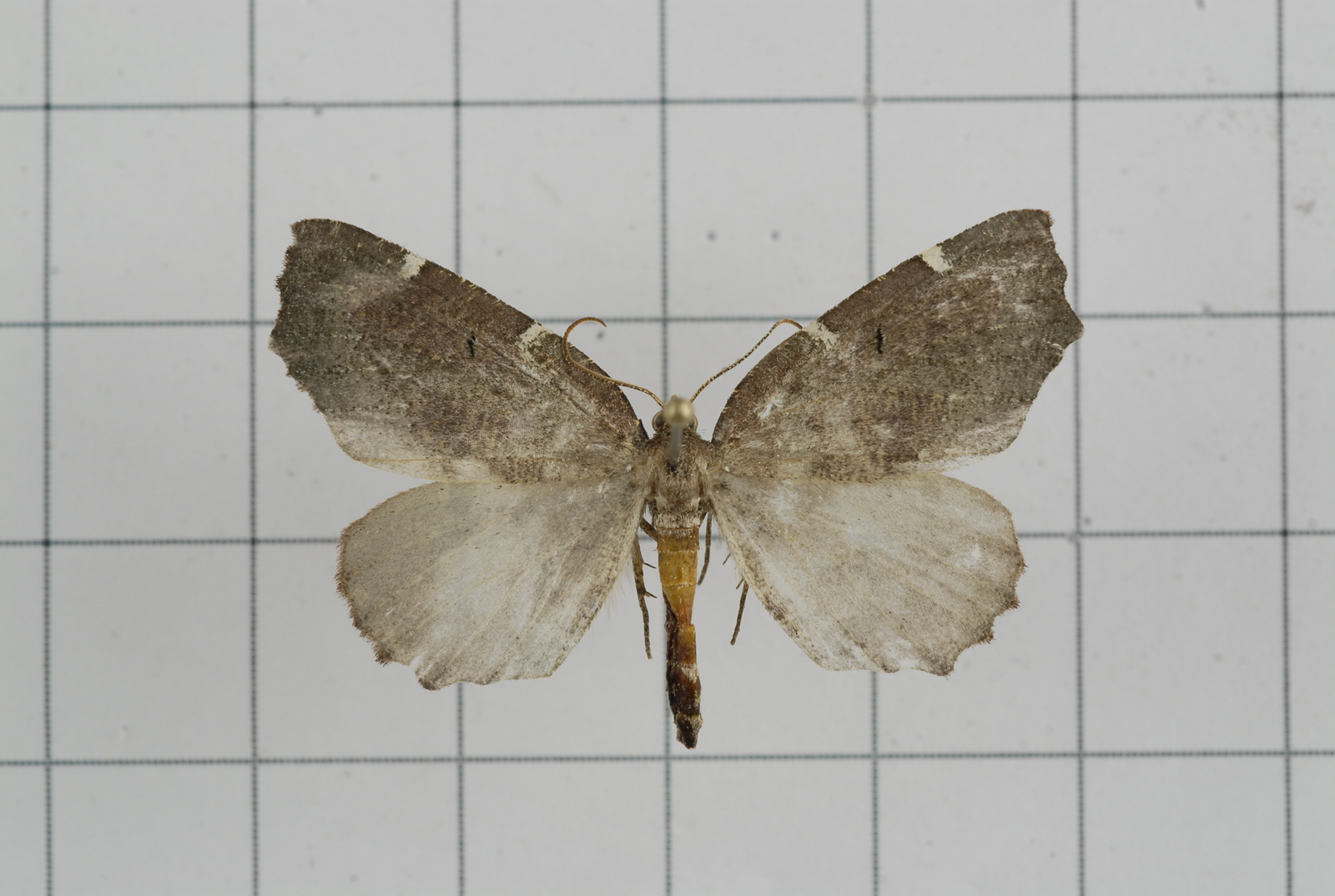
- Image of Seleniopsis

Scientific classification
- Kingdom: Animalia
- Phylum: Arthropoda
- Clade: Pancrustacea
- Class: Insecta
- Order: Lepidoptera
- Family: Geometridae
- Genus: Seleniopsis

= Seleniopsis =

Genus of moths

Seleniopsis is a genus of moths in the family Geometridae.
