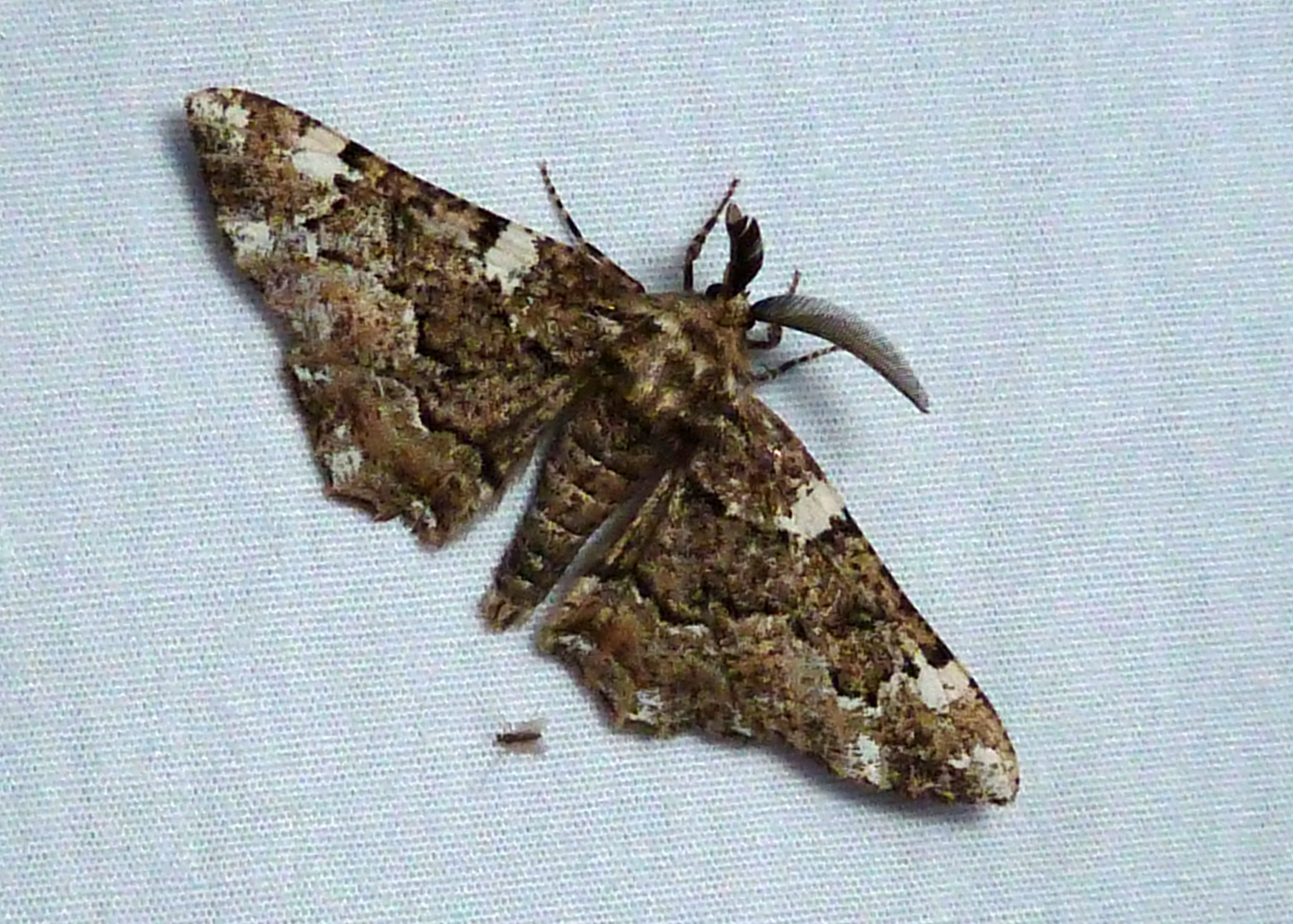
- Phaeoura quernaria

Scientific classification
- Domain: Eukaryota
- Kingdom: Animalia
- Phylum: Arthropoda
- Class: Insecta
- Order: Lepidoptera
- Family: Geometridae
- Tribe: Nacophorini
- Genus: Phaeoura; Hulst, 1896

Species
- see text

= Phaeoura =

Genus of moths

Phaeoura is a genus of moths in the family Geometridae.

Species include:

- Phaeoura cristifera
- Phaeoura kirkwoodi
- Phaeoura mexicanaria - pine looper
- Phaeoura perfidaria
- Phaeoura quernaria - oak beauty
