= Ectephrina =

Scientific classification
- Kingdom: Animalia
- Phylum: Arthropoda
- Class: Insecta
- Order: Lepidoptera
- Superfamily: Noctuoidea
- Family: Noctuidae
- Genus: Ectephrina; Wehrli, 1937

Genus of moths

Ectephrina is a genus of moths in the family Geometridae.

== Species ==
- Ectephrina semilutata (Lederer, 1853)
