= Devenilia =

Scientific classification
- Kingdom: Animalia
- Phylum: Arthropoda
- Class: Insecta
- Order: Lepidoptera
- Family: Geometridae
- Subfamily: Ennominae
- Genus: Devenilia; Wehrli, 1937

Genus of moths

Devenilia is a genus of moths in the family Geometridae.

== Species ==
- Devenilia corearia (Leech, 1891)
