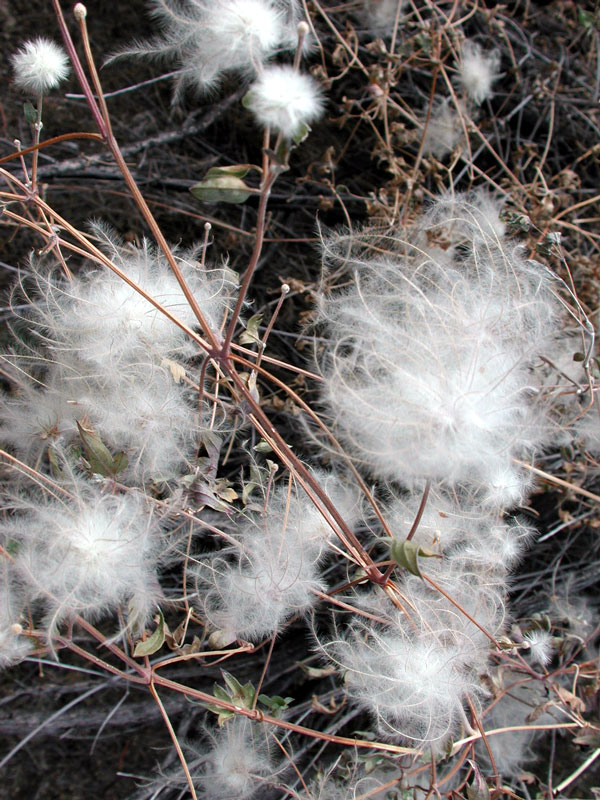

Conservation status
- Secure (NatureServe)

Scientific classification
- Kingdom: Plantae
- Clade: Tracheophytes
- Clade: Angiosperms
- Clade: Eudicots
- Order: Ranunculales
- Family: Ranunculaceae
- Genus: Clematis
- Species: C. drummondii

Binomial name
- Clematis drummondii Torr. & A.Gray

= Clematis drummondii =

Species of flowering plant in the buttercup family

Clematis drummondii is a species of flowering plant in the buttercup family, Ranunculaceae, that is native to the Southwestern United States (Arizona, New Mexico, and Texas) and northern Mexico. Common names include old man's beard, Texas virgin's bower, and barba de chivato. It is a white-flowered vine that can be found clambering among other wildflowers, on shrubs and on fence rows. The natural habitat of C. drummondii includes the Chihuahuan Desert and Sonoran Desert, as well as prairies and grasslands. The sap of this plant is caustic, although its foliage, stems, and roots can be used for dye if caution is used while handling and if breathing the fumes is avoided.
