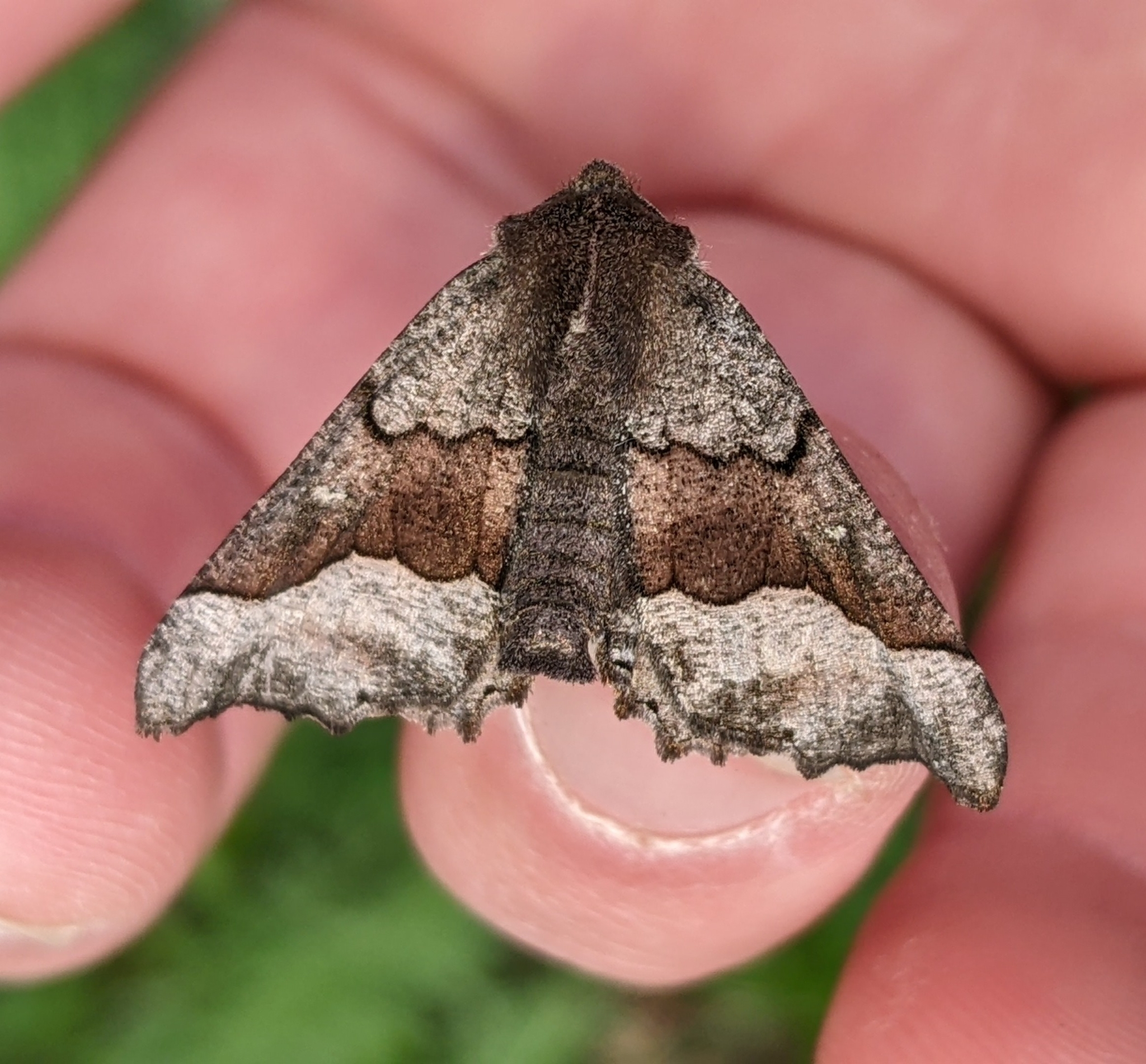

Scientific classification
- Kingdom: Animalia
- Phylum: Arthropoda
- Clade: Pancrustacea
- Class: Insecta
- Order: Lepidoptera
- Family: Geometridae
- Subfamily: Ennominae
- Tribe: Azelinini; Forbes, 1948

Genera
- Several, but see text

= Azelinini =

Tribe of moths

The Azelinini are a tribe of geometer moths in the subfamily Ennominae, with many species in the Southern Hemisphere, particularly in South America. Several species are found in North America as well. These stocky geometer moths seem to be closely related to other robust tribes, such as the Campaeini, Ennomini, Lithinini and Nacophorini – all of which might warrant to be subsumed in the Ennomini – the genus Odontopera, and perhaps the Caberini and Colotoini. The tribe was first described by William Trowbridge Merrifield Forbes in 1948.

== Description ==
They rest with their wings stretched out parallel to the surface, and the hindwings hidden under the forewings unlike most related Ennominae. Though they are among the larger Geometridae, they are nonetheless not very conspicuous; the outer third of the forewings is usually conspicuously lighter than the middle third, and at the apical end of the forewing cell there is usually a white or black spot, altogether very much reminiscent of the Ennomini's pattern.

At least some Azelinini lack the sensillae at the end of the adults' antennae found in most geometer moths. The foreleg tarsi are relatively short, as in many of their relatives. The hindwing veins Sc and R1 are extensively fused in some Azelinini, reminding of the Larentiini which are not very closely related. The characteristic comb of transverse setae on the underside of the males' abdominal segment A3, found in many Ennominae, is apparently absent in the Azelinini, as is the associated "scent-brush" on the hindleg tibiae.

The male genital's valvae usually have complex autapomorphic modifications (such as a hypertrophied ampulla and gnathos) in this tribe, but the valvula, like in their relatives, is not distally expanded. Unusually, they have both an elongated uncus and well-developed socii;, the sacculus is rarely hairy and the saccus' vinculum is generally neither extended nor recurved. Some Azelilini, perhaps all, completely lack the cornuti (spines) on the vesica of the aedeagus usually found in Lepidoptera.

Of the female genitalia, the ovipositor is narrow. A robust funnel-shaped antrum – the foremost part of the ostium bursae – is present and the interior of the corpus bursae is studded with small spines, while the ductus bursae is delicate and not sclerotized much.

Like the Nacophorini, their caterpillars have many setae on the (vestigial) prolegs of abdominal segment A6. And like the Ennomini and Nacophorini, their pupae have antennal tubercles. The chorion cell walls of their eggs are visibly reticulated only around the micropyle.

== Selected genera ==
As numerous ennomine genera have not yet been assigned to a tribe, the genus list is preliminary.

- Pero Herrich-Schäffer, 1855
- Stenaspilatodes Franclemont & Poole, 1972

Oratha, usually placed in the Nacophorini, might also belong here.
