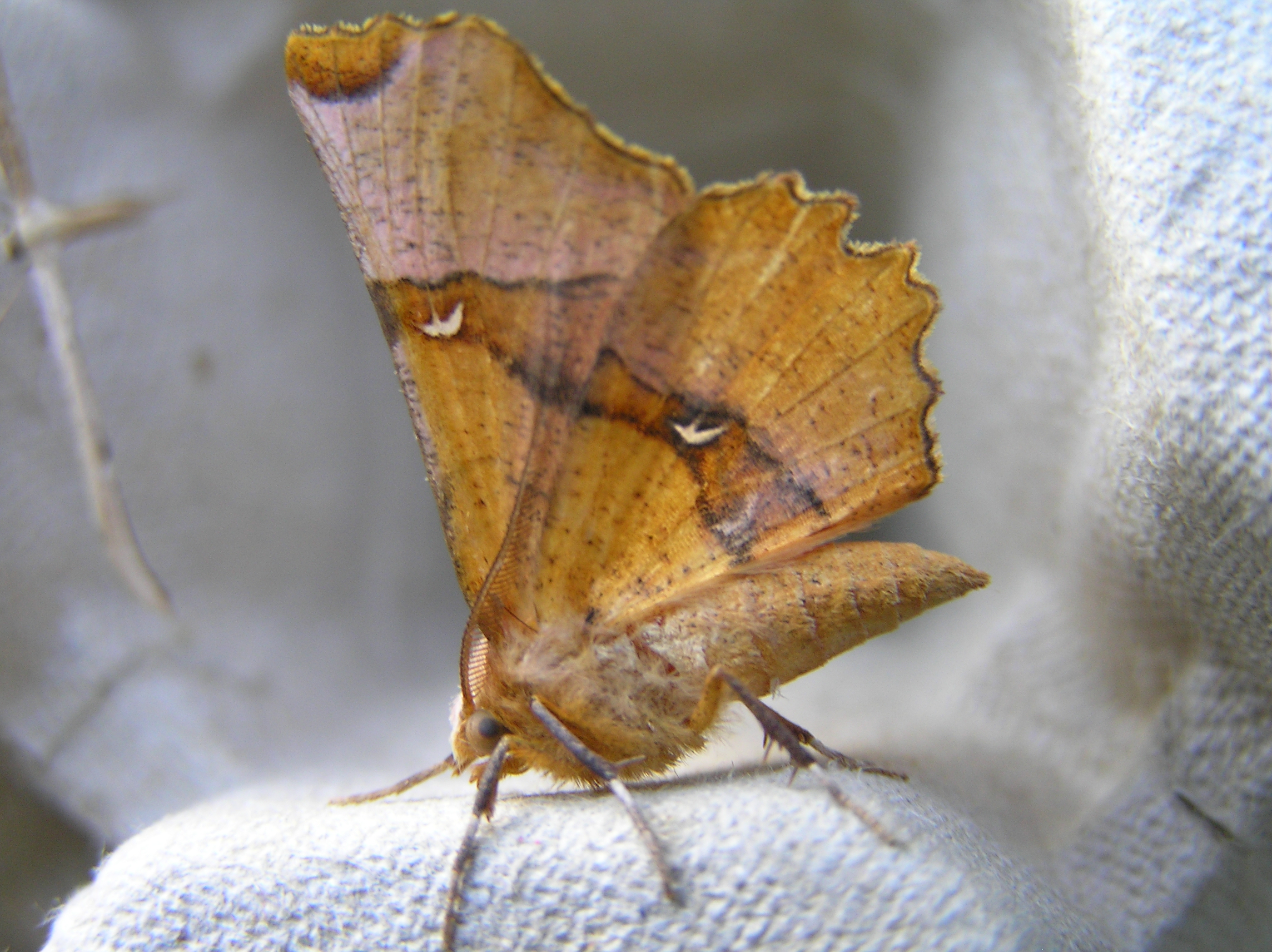

Scientific classification
- Kingdom: Animalia
- Phylum: Arthropoda
- Class: Insecta
- Order: Lepidoptera
- Family: Geometridae
- Genus: Selenia
- Species: S. lunularia

Binomial name
- Selenia lunularia (Hübner, 1788)

= Selenia lunularia =

Lunar thorn

Species of moth

Selenia lunularia, the lunar thorn, is a moth of the family Geometridae. It is found in Europe except Iberia and Greece; also in Asia Minor, Armenia, SiberiaIssyk-Kul.

The wingspan is 38–44 mm. The length of the forewings is 16–22 mm. Similar to Selenia dentaria but "Antemedian lines of forewing strongly curved, postmedian almost straight, oblique outwards, median area very much wider posteriorly than anteriorly, wholly or in part dark-shaded.- ab. sublunaria Steph. is much darker and more purple, almost exactly the colour of some tetralunaria - delunaria Hhn. the 2nd generation, is on an average rather smaller and with less irroration, but differs less from the 1st brood than in the other [related] species. The ground colour of the caterpillar is usually some shade of brown, ranging from greyish or greenish to reddish, variegated with darker or paler clouds, and with traces of pale lines on the back.Humps and protrusions on the fifth, eighth and ninth segments gives them the appearance of a small branch with buds and represents an excellent camouflage.

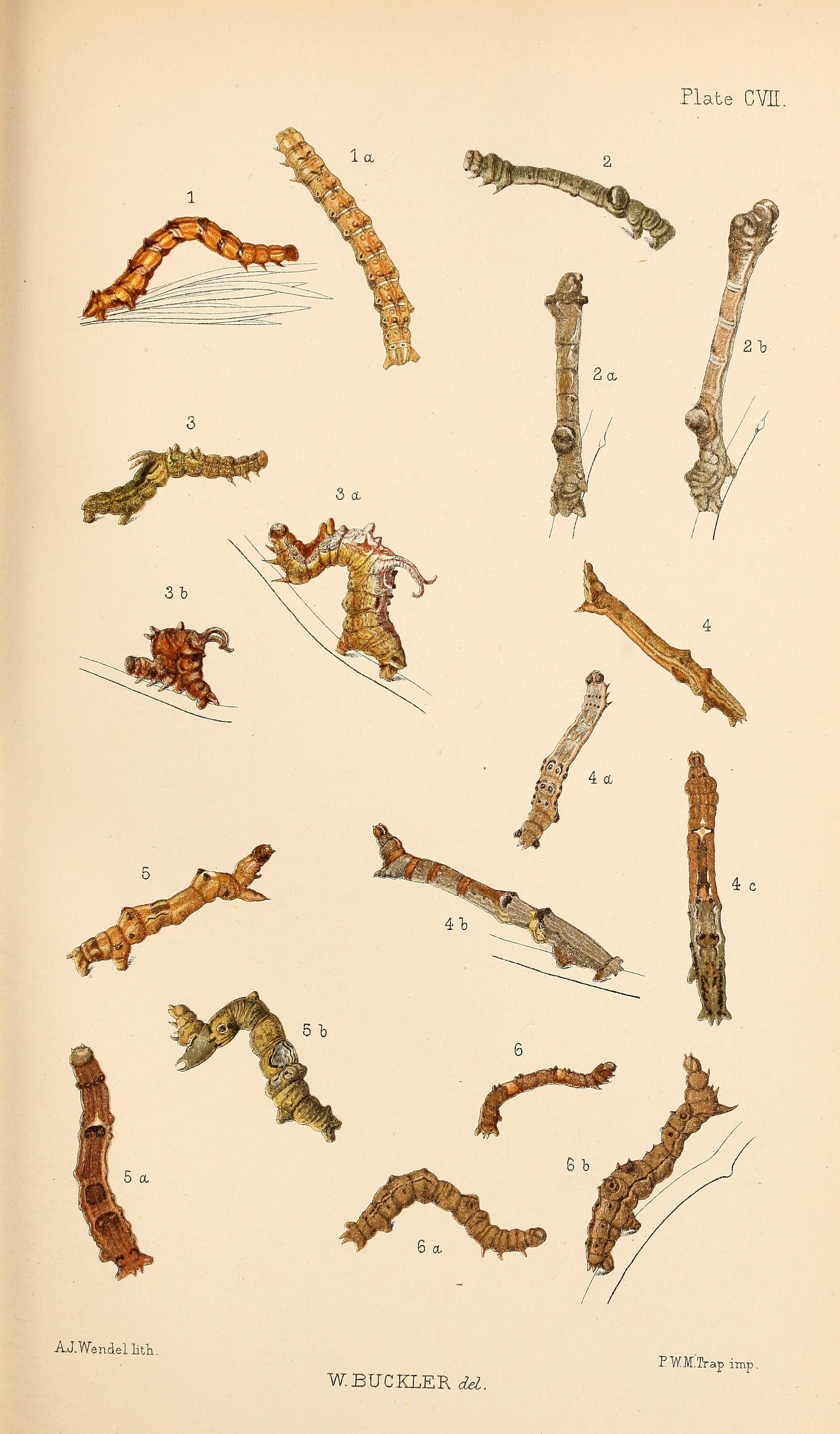
Fig 5, 5a, 5b Larva after final moult

The moth flies in two generation from mid-May to mid-August.

The caterpillars feed on various deciduous trees, such as birch and oak.

== Notes ==
1. The flight season refers to Belgium and The Netherlands. This may vary in other parts of the range.
