= Selenia =

Selenia may refer to:

- Selenia (company), an Italian electronics company merged into Alenia Aeronautica
- Selenia (moth), a genus of moths
- Selenia (plant), a genus of plants
- Selenia, a character from the film Arthur and the Invisibles
