= Reuben Haines III =

American Quaker farmer

- Born: February 8, 1786; Philadelphia, Pennsylvania, US
- Died: October 19, 1831 (aged 45); Philadelphia, Pennsylvania, US
- Resting place: Germantown Friends' Meeting House Cemetery
- Known for: animal science, agricultural science, meteorology, ornithology, firefighting
- Scientific career
- Fields: naturalist, ornithologist
- Workplaces: Academy of Natural Sciences of Philadelphia

Reuben Haines III (February 8, 1786 – October 19, 1831) was a Quaker farmer, brewer, abolitionist, scientist, ornithologist, meteorologist, firefighter, philanthropist, and educational reformer from Philadelphia, Pennsylvania.

Haines was a founder and first president of the Philadelphia Hose Company, the first organization in the United States devoted to fighting fires by pumping water through a leather hose. He was a founding member of the Pennsylvania Horticultural Society, served as the corresponding secretary of the Academy of Natural Sciences of Philadelphia for 17 years (1814–1831), and made significant early contributions to the museum collection. He was the first person to import Alderney cattle (a now extinct breed closely related to Guernsey cattle) into the United States.

Haines was the proprietor of the historic Wyck House in Germantown, Pennsylvania.

== Family ==
Haines was born into a wealthy Quaker family with an extensive social network. He was the son of Caspar Wistar Haines (1762–1801) and Hannah (Marshall) Haines (1765–1828); great-grandson of Caspar Wistar (1696–1752), the glass maker; and grandson of Reuben Haines (1727–1793), the brewer and land prospector. Timothy Matlack the brewer-politician was his uncle. Haines was the heir of a family homestead in Germantown that had been passed down since 1692 on his father’s side, now known as the Wyck House. It was founded by his ancestor, Hans Milan, an early settler of Germantown, who immigrated to the Pennsylvania colony from Holland or lower Rhineland.

Haines married Jane Bowne (1792–1843) in New York on May 12, 1812. They had nine children:

- Sarah Minturn Haines (b. March 30, 1812)
- Margaret Haines
- Elizabeth Bowne Haines (1817–1891)
- John Smith Haines (1820–1850)
- Hannah Haines (1822–1882)
- Sarah Haines, who died in childbirth
- Robert Bowne (1827–1895)
- Margaret "Meta" Haines (1830–1878)
- Jane Reuben Haines (1832–1911), both after her father's death, master of Wyck until 1911.

=== Residences ===
Haines spent a portion of his childhood at the Wyck House in Germantown, which in 1971 was designated as a National Historic Landmark. To escape the yellow fever epidemic that took the life of his grandparents and devastated Philadelphia in 1793, the Haines family relocated to their ancestral property in Germantown by 1794. Haines lived at Wyck from 1794 to 1797, during which time he helped his father construct a stone barn (1795/96) on the Wyck property, and the Germantown Brewery on the lot adjacent to Wyck, which would remain in business from 1795 to the 1840s.

Haines lived at boarding school from 1797 until his father's death in 1801, after which he moved back to Germantown. Several months later, he and his mother Hannah moved to Philadelphia, where they lived together in a house on New Bank St. until Reuben married in 1812. Haines and his new bride then moved into a new townhouse at 300 Chestnut St., which became an occasional venue for the famous "Wistar Parties", which were regular gatherings of intellectuals (most associated with the American Philosophical Society) organized by his cousin, the eminent physician Dr. Caspar Wistar.

From 1814 to 1820, Haines and his young family went to Wyck for the summer seasons, and then in 1820 relocated there permanently. A diary entry by Haines dated "6 mo. 1, 1820" (June 1) reads: "waggon & 2 carts to Philada. to bring R. H. Goods. R. Haines left Philada. & moved to Germantown."

=== Education and early adulthood ===
Haines attended boarding school in Burlington, New Jersey, from January 1797 to April 1798; after which, he moved in with his uncle, Richard Hartshorne, in Philadelphia. He attended Fourth St. Friends School from December 1798 to March 1799. Haines was enrolled in the inaugural class at Westtown School, a private Quaker boarding school in Chester County, Pennsylvania. This is presumably where Haines began his friendship with Thomas Say, the zoologist and explorer, who was his classmate, and where he was introduced to a wide array of scientific topics including astronomy and natural history. Haines spent only three years at Westtown before leaving prematurely after his father's death.

After his father's death, Haines entered into an apprenticeship in a dry goods store in Philadelphia, owned by his uncles Christopher Marshall and Abraham Garrigues, where he worked until 1809. During this time, Haines took classes at the University of Pennsylvania from Benjamin Smith Barton (ornithology and botany), Thomas Cooper (chemistry), and Benjamin Rush (medicine). In 1809, he decided that his "whole attention should be engrossed ... in the pursuit of knowledge [and] the society of genuine friends", and thereafter lived off his inherited wealth, which included real estate in Philadelphia and rural Pennsylvania, the Germantown Brewery, and interest-paying bonds and loans.

=== Philadelphia Hose Company ===
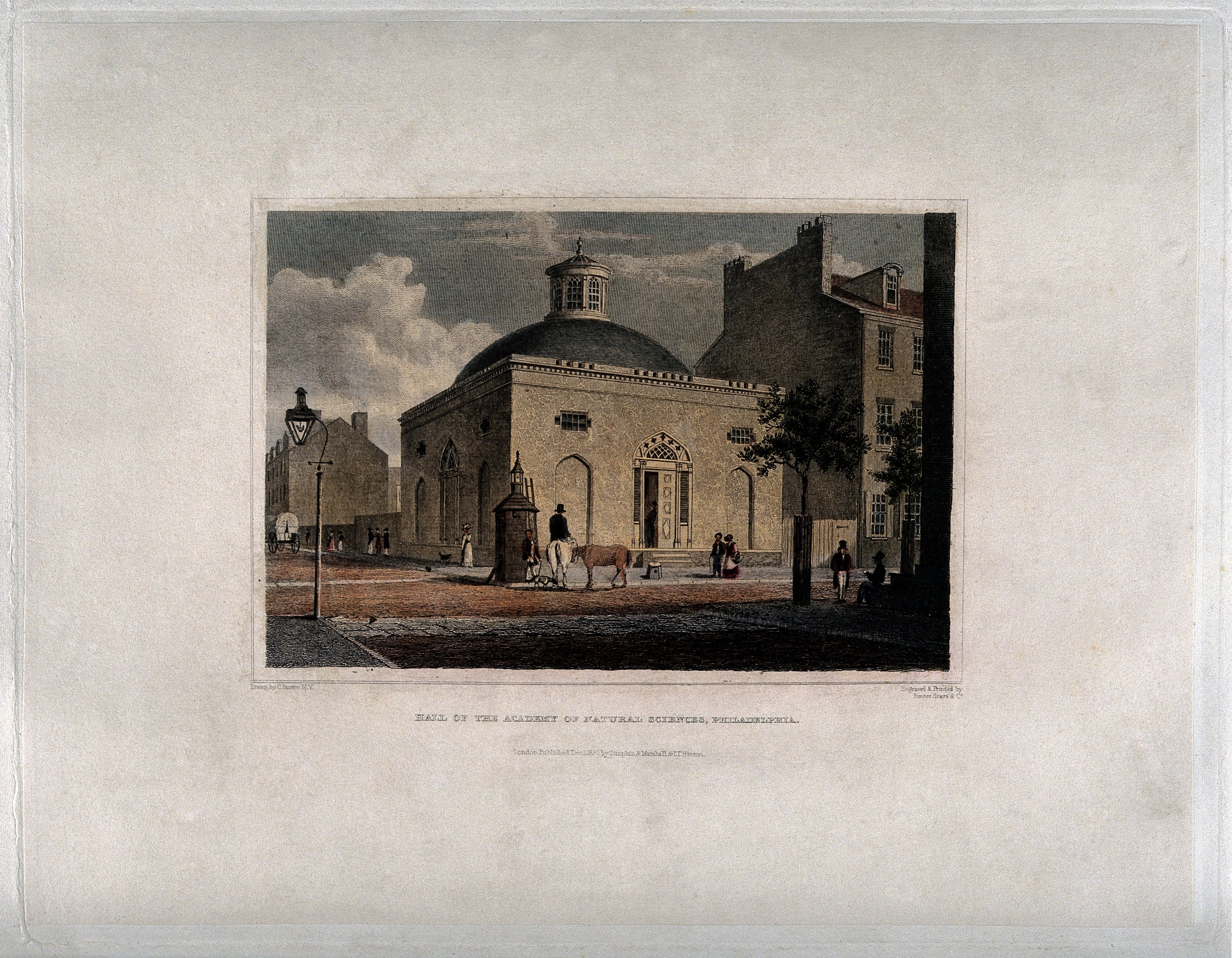
Academy of Natural Sciences of Philadelphia (ANSP) Museum, 12th and Sansom Sts., Philadelphia. Haines attended meetings at this (now demolished) building from 1826 until his death in 1831. The ANSP vacated the building in 1840.

Haines hosted the first meeting of the company at his home (No. 4 Bank St., Philadelphia) on December 15, 1803. At the time, he was working as a clerk in the store of his uncle, the merchant Abraham Garrigues (husband of his mother's sister).

=== Philanthropic activities ===
Haines invested his wealth in building projects in Philadelphia and elsewhere, including the Fairmount Water Works (constructed 1812-1815) and the Lancaster Turnpike.

=== Participation in Scientific Societies ===
Haines was elected to the Academy of Natural Sciences of Philadelphia on November 16, 1813. He became corresponding secretary in 1814, after the previous secretary, Camillus M. Mann, neglected his duties. In this role, and through his contacts in the Quaker community, Haines engaged with a large network of scientists in North America and abroad. In New York, his contacts included Samuel L. Mitchill and DeWitt Clinton, who soon organized a similar society called the New York Lyceum of Natural History, now known as the New York Academy of Sciences.

Although Haines did not publish his own work, he participated in peer review with other Academy members. He was on the committee that gave a favorable review to Thomas Nuttall's description of the golden selenia (Selenia aurea) and clasping jewelflower (Streptanthus maculatus), type species of the genus Streptanthus. Prior to his involvement at the Academy, he had served as volunteer librarian at the Friends' Library in 1809–1810.

Haines was one of three Academy members who nominated John James Audubon for membership in 1824; the others were Charles Alexandre Lesueur and Isaiah Lukens, the clockmaker. Audubon was rejected on suspicion of scientific misconduct. Five letters from Audubon to Haines are extant.

In 1829, Haines was elected a Corresponding Member of the Royal Academy of Sciences of Turin, Italy.

=== Herpetology / Ichthyology / Paleontology ===
Haines discovered one of the two syntypes of the Queen snake (Regina septemvittata), on the second floor of his home (Wyck House), which was described by Say in 1825.

Haines collected the type specimen of Catostomus vittatus, an American fish described by Charles Alexandre Lesueur in 1817. Lesueur wrote: "This remarkable little species was found in Wissahickon creek, near Philadelphia, by Reuben Haines".

The holotype of Baculites ovatus, described by Say in 1820 and later illustrated by Samuel G. Morton, was in Haines's collection. It was lost for more than 180 years after his death until 2017, when it was rediscovered at the Wyck House.

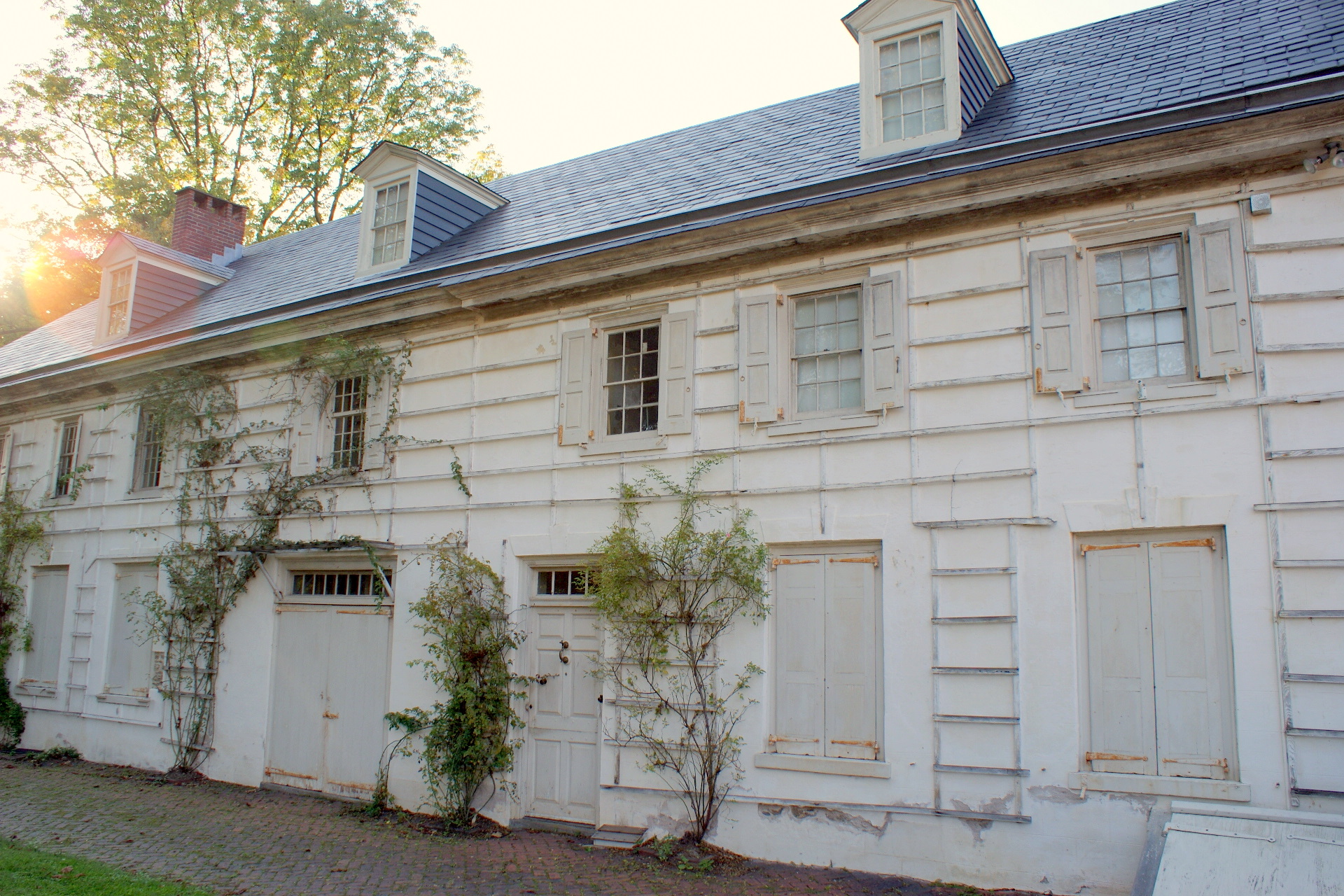
The home of Reuben Haines III: the historic Wyck House in Germantown, Philadelphia. Photo taken in 2009.

=== Ornithology ===
Haines studied ornithology under Benjamin Smith Barton and is the first known person to successfully breed Canada Geese (Branta canadensis) in captivity in Pennsylvania. Between 1818–1828, numerous influential ornithologists visited Wyck to see the geese including George Ord, Thomas Nuttall, Charles Alexandre Lesueur and John James Audubon. A note in his expense ledger dated April 9, 1824, reads [sic]: "Charles J. Wistar, Thos. Say & Charles Bonaparte (Prince of Canneno) son of [...] dined with me at Germantown after an ornithological excursion."

Haines was one of the few Philadelphians who befriended Nuttall, according to a "Biographical Notice of the late Mr. Nuttall" published in 1861:

"Naturally reserved, little fond of company, and absorbed by his studies, [Nuttall's] circle of acquaintance was very limited. Professor Barton, Messrs. Zaccheus Collins, Reuben Haines, Correa de Serra, a few other devotees of science, and three or four families of Philadelphia and Germantown, were the only persons whom he visited."

=== Abolition and Civil Rights ===
Haines was a supporter of the emancipation of enslaved African Americans in the United States, and the education of African American youth.

A notice published on May 14, 1819, in the Daily National Intelligencer and Washington Express, reads: "A free black man named Henry Hudson was lately kidnapped at Germantown, near Philadelphia, while at work alone on the farm of Reuben Haines, Esq.—Mr. Haines has offered a reward of one hundred dollars for the detection of the persons who committed this outrage." Haines subsequently posted a letter in the Alexandria Gazette on May 21, which ran daily through the end of September 1819, and which read: "[Hudson] is a very civil, inoffensive man, with rather a down look ... Any information respecting him will be thankfully received ... The above reward [$100] will be cheerfully paid on conviction of the perpetrators of this flagrant outrage upon the rights of a freeborn citizen of the United States. [signed] Reuben Haines."

A letter dated July 1, 1831, written by James Ronaldson and addressed to Haines, reads: "I am well acquainted with the deep interest each of you takes in, not only the promoting of emancipation of the Africans, but also, your anxiety that these people should advance in intellectual knowledge and social respectability."

=== Educational Reform ===
Haines was the first life-member of the American Institute of Instruction, where he also served as vice president. He was one of the founding directors of the Pennsylvania Institution for the Deaf and Dumb, established in 1821, now known as the Pennsylvania School for the Deaf.

From 1821-1824, Haines enrolled his daughter Sarah in a school based on the educational philosophy of Johann Pestalozzi, operated by Madame Fretageot.

Just prior to his death in 1831, Haines had hired Amos Bronson Alcott to teach at a new school in Germantown, and their two families shared a close bond of friendship.

=== Death ===
Haines died unexpectedly on the evening of October 19, 1831, evidently from an overdose of laudanum. He was buried in a family plot at the cemetery of the Germantown Friends' Meeting House, at the corner of Germantown Ave. and Coulter St., Philadelphia. A handwritten eulogy that was presumably read at his funeral survives among the family papers:

"When Reuben Haines joined [the Academy of Natural Sciences of Philadelphia], it was composed of a few members & was just struggling into existence. He brought to it indeed no peculiar stores of scientific knowledge & yet, to no one, except its munificent President [William Maclure], is the Academy more indebted for its present prosperous condition, than to our lamented friend."

== Publications ==
Haines, R. 1824. On the cultivation of peach trees and the drying of fruits. The American Farmer 6, 401–402.

Haines, R. 1828. On Alderney cattle and the extraordinary properties of their milk. Memoirs of the Pennsylvania Agricultural Society. J. S. Skinner, Philadelphia, PA.
