= Reuben Haines =

American brewer (1727–1793)

- Born: January 1, 1727; Burlington, New Jersey, Province of New Jersey, British America
- Died: October 23, 1793 (aged 66); Philadelphia, Pennsylvania, U.S.
- Known for: Master Brewer namesake of Haines Township, Centre County, Pennsylvania

Reuben Haines (January 1, 1727 – October 23, 1793) was an early American brewer, firefighter, and land prospector from Philadelphia, Pennsylvania.

Haines is the namesake of Haines Township, Centre County, Pennsylvania. In 1771, he funded the construction of a road (now roughly the location of U.S.Route 11, County Line Road, along with the eastern portion of Pennsylvania Route 304 in Union County, and western portion of Pennsylvania Route 45 in Union County and beyond) from Northumberland through the "Woodward Narrows", to the modern site of Spring Mill — the first road in what is now Centre County. The modern boundaries of Penn Township (formed 1844) and a portion of Gregg Township (formed 1826) were annexed from a larger Haines Township (now only 148.6 km^{2}) that was established before Centre County was officially declared in 1800.

Haines was a proprietor of the historic Wyck House in Germantown, Philadelphia, Pennsylvania.

Haines also founded the town of Northumberland, Pennsylvania in 1772.

== Biography ==
=== Family and marriage ===
Haines was the son of Josiah Haines and Martha Burr, both of Burlington County, New Jersey. After the death of Josiah, his mother married Timothy Matlack Sr. (1695–1752), with whom she had more children. One of these children was Timothy Matlack, the brewer and politician, who was Haines's younger half-brother. Haines was also the first cousin of the Quaker abolitionist John Woolman.

On April 4, 1760, Haines married Margaret Wistar (1729–1793), daughter of the wealthy glass-maker Caspar Wistar. They had five children:

- Catherine Haines (1761–1808), who married Richard Hartshorne
- Caspar Wistar Haines (1762–1803), who married Hannah Marshall and inherited the Wyck House estate. They were the parents of Reuben Haines III, scientist and farmer.
- Josiah Haines (1764–?), who married Susan Harriett Bull
- Reuben Haines Jr. (1765–1793)
- Martha Haines (1769–1781)

=== Firefighting ===
Haines and his stepfather Timothy Matlack Sr. were members of the Fellowship Fire Company, the second organized fire company in the British colonies.

=== Brewery ===
After his stepfather's death in 1752, Haines inherited his brewery, multiple properties, and a considerable amount of debt. Haines continued this business with the help of his sons, Caspar Haines and Reuben Haines Jr. From 1784 to 1793, "Reuben Haines and Sons" brewery was located at No. 145 Market Street in Philadelphia. A few months before his death, Haines led a parade of more than 75 brewers through the streets of Philadelphia, with banners reading "Home brew'd is best" and "Proper drink for Americans".

Haines's clients included many notable figures including Benjamin Franklin and George Washington.

He was a member of the Philadelphia Society for Promoting Agriculture.

=== Death ===
Haines and his wife Margaret died in Philadelphia during the yellow fever epidemic of 1793.
