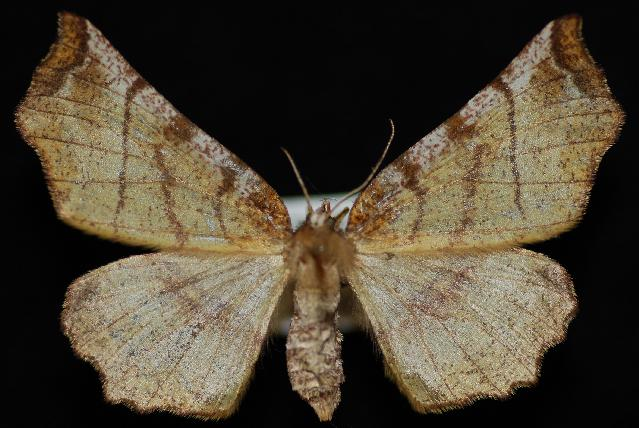

Scientific classification
- Kingdom: Animalia
- Phylum: Arthropoda
- Class: Insecta
- Order: Lepidoptera
- Family: Geometridae
- Genus: Selenia
- Species: S. alciphearia

Binomial name
- Selenia alciphearia Walker, 1860

= Selenia alciphearia =

Species of moth

Selenia alciphearia, known generally as the northern selenia or brown-tipped thorn, is a species of geometrid moth in the family Geometridae. It is found in North America.

The MONA or Hodges number for Selenia alciphearia is 6817.
