= Wyck House =

Historic house in Pennsylvania, United States

- U.S. National Register of Historic Places
- U.S. National Historic Landmark
- U.S. National Historic Landmark District – Contributing property
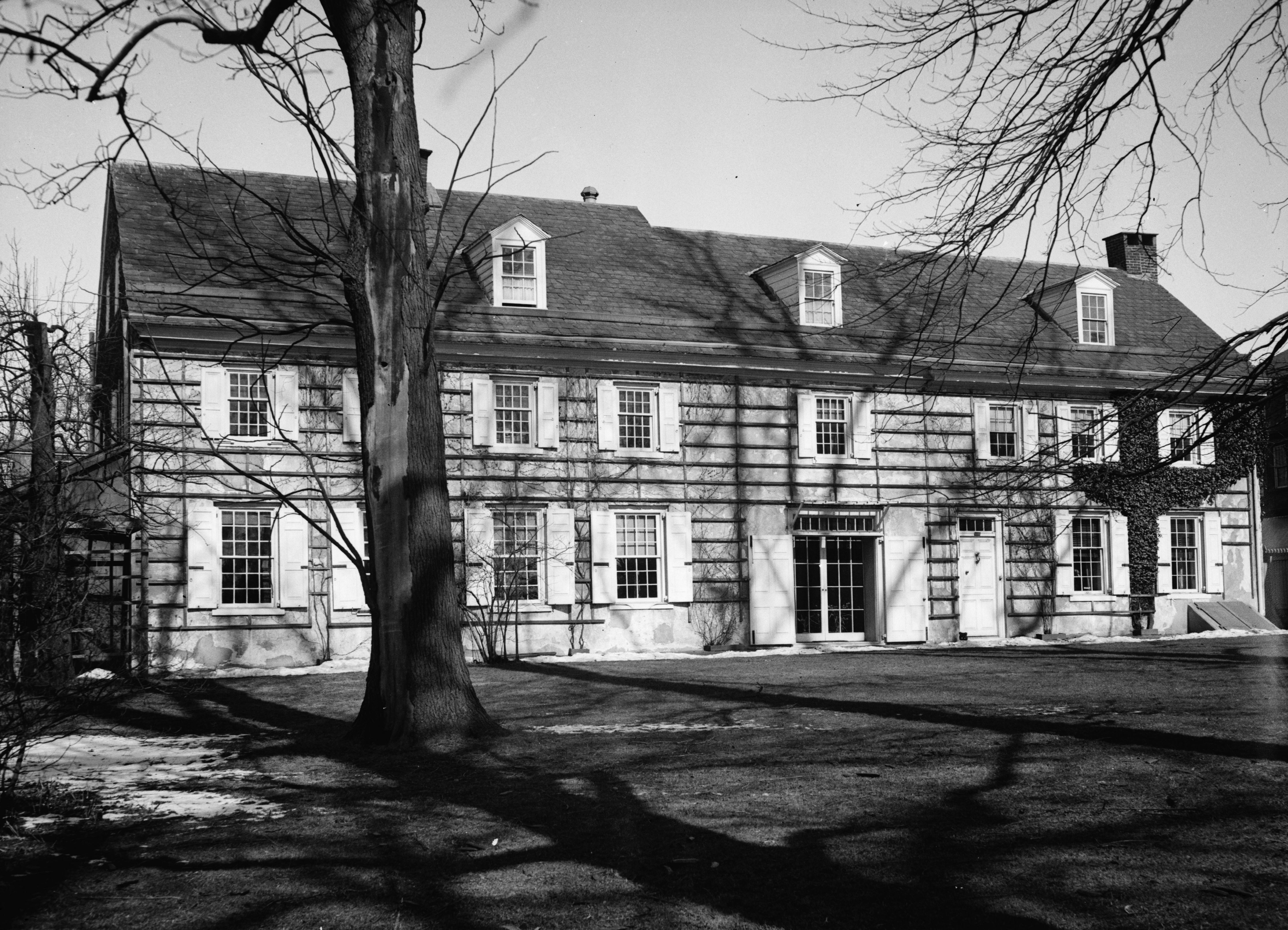

- Location within Philadelphia Location within Pennsylvania Location within the United States
- Location: 6026 Germantown Avenue; Germantown, Philadelphia, Pennsylvania, United States
- Coordinates: 40°1′18″N 75°10′43″W
- Area: 2.5 acres (1.0 ha)
- Architect: William Strickland
- Part of: Colonial Germantown Historic District (ID66000678)
- NRHP reference No.: 71000736

Significant dates
- Added to NRHP: October 26, 1971
- Designated NHL: December 14, 1990
- Designated NHLDCP: June 23, 1965

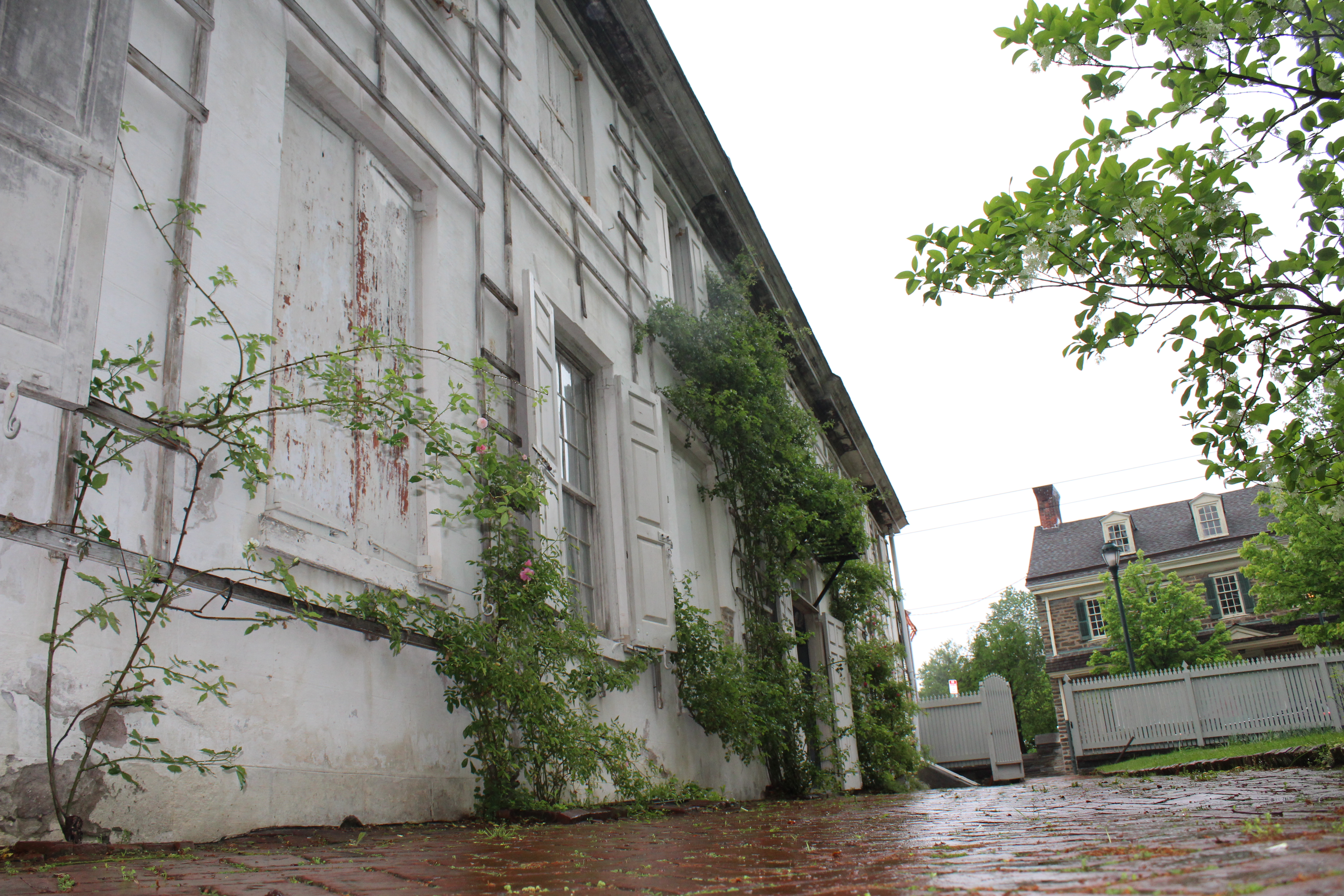
Digital photograph of the front face of the Wyck house, with its historic roses climbing the trellis, facing northeast toward Germantown Ave. The building in the background is the Green Tree Tavern (6023 Germantown Ave.), built in 1743.

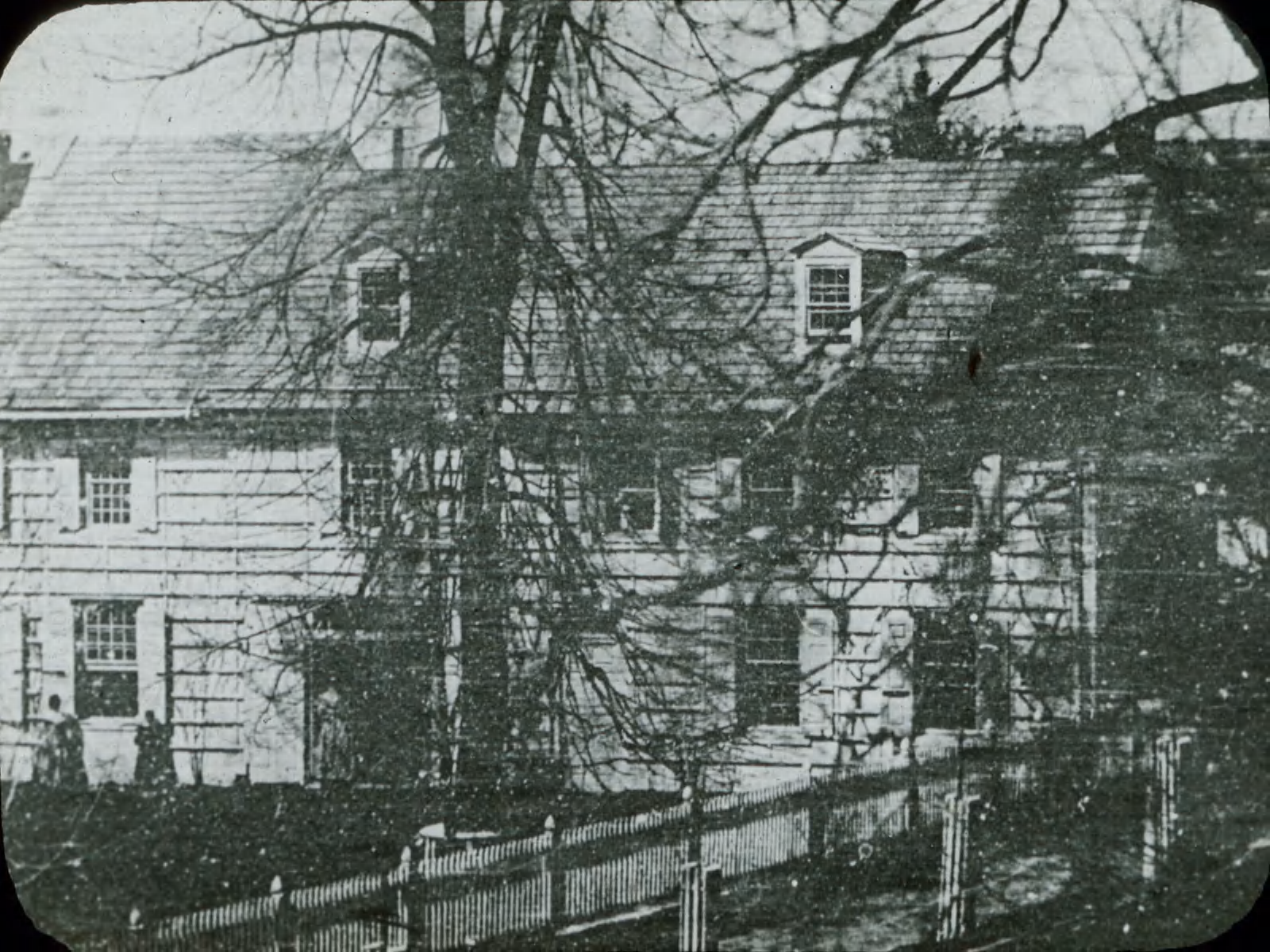
Wyck in March 1840, from daguerreotype made by Prof. Walter R. Johnson. Image transferred to Lantern Slide c.1913 by John G. Bullock (1854-1939). Original in collection of Library Company of Philadelphia.

The Wyck house, also known as the Haines house or Hans Millan house, is a historic mansion, museum, garden, and urban farm in the Germantown neighborhood of Philadelphia, Pennsylvania. It was recognized as a National Historic Landmark in 1971 for its well-preserved condition and its documentary records, which span nine generations of a single family.

During the American Revolution, the Wyck house was occupied by British forces and used as a field hospital ("a room for amputations and other hospital operations, requiring prompt care") after the Battle of Germantown, in October 1777. Wyck was the site of an early American brewery from 1794 to 1801, and later became a meeting place of influential American scientists and artists including Thomas Say, Charles Lucien Bonaparte, John James Audubon, Thomas Nuttall, William Cooper, William Maclure, Charles Alexandre Lesueur, Margaretta Morris, Elizabeth Carrington Morris, and George Ord. Wyck is the type locality of the Queen snake (Regina septemvittata), discovered on the second floor of the house by Reuben Haines III and described in 1825 by Thomas Say. It is also the type locality of the terrestrial gastropod Ventridens suppressus (Say 1829).

The house was renovated in 1824 by William Strickland, the famous Greek revivalist architect. The following year, Gilbert du Motier, Marquis de Lafayette returned to visit the sites of the Battle of Germantown, and was hosted in a reception at Wyck.

== History ==
Wyck's earliest owner was Hans Millan (also spelled Milan), a Quaker who came from Germany by 1689, and was a descendant of a Swiss Mennonite family. His daughter, Margaret, married a Dutch Quaker named Dirck Jansen, who prospered as a linen weaver in the first half of the 18th century. By the time of his death, he was listed as a gentleman and had Anglicized his name to Dirk Johnson. Their daughter, Catherine, married Caspar Wistar, a German who became a Quaker and amassed a sizable fortune as a button maker, glassmaker and investor in land.

In the next generation, Margaret Wistar (daughter of Catherine and Caspar) married Reuben Haines, a brewer and merchant of English descent from Burlington County, NJ. In 1771, Reuben funded the construction of a road (now Pennsylvania Route 45) from Sunbury through the "Woodward Narrows", to the modern site of Spring Mill — the first road in what is now Centre County. The modern boundaries of Penn Township (formed 1844) and a portion of Gregg Township (formed 1826) were annexed from a larger Haines Township (now only 148.6 km^{2}) that was established before Centre County was officially declared in 1800.

Their son Caspar Wistar Haines continued the family businesses and married Hannah Marshall, a member of another Quaker family. Wyck then passed to Reuben Haines III (1786–1831) and his wife Jane (Bowne) Haines (1792–1843). After their deaths, Wyck was passed to their youngest daughter, Jane Reuben Haines, who lived here until 1911, carefully preserving the house, furnishings and gardens.

Wyck served as a summer home until Reuben Haines III moved his family into it as their permanent residence. Shortly after this move, he hired his friend, William Strickland, to remodel the entire building. Reuben is also responsible for Wyck's name, as nobody with the last name Wyck ever married into the family. On one of his many travels, Reuben came across a landscape sketch of Wyck the Seat of Richard Haines esq. Believing that Richard Haines was a relative, Reuben brought the sketch back to his house, and started calling his own home Wyck. It was later revealed that Reuben's family had no connection to Richard Haines, but the name stuck.

In the eighth generation, Jane B. Haines founded the first school of horticulture for women, the Pennsylvania School of Horticulture for Women, which is now Temple Ambler, and one brother, Caspar, helped design the Mexican railway system; while another, Robert, invented a gauge for measuring steel in rolling mills.

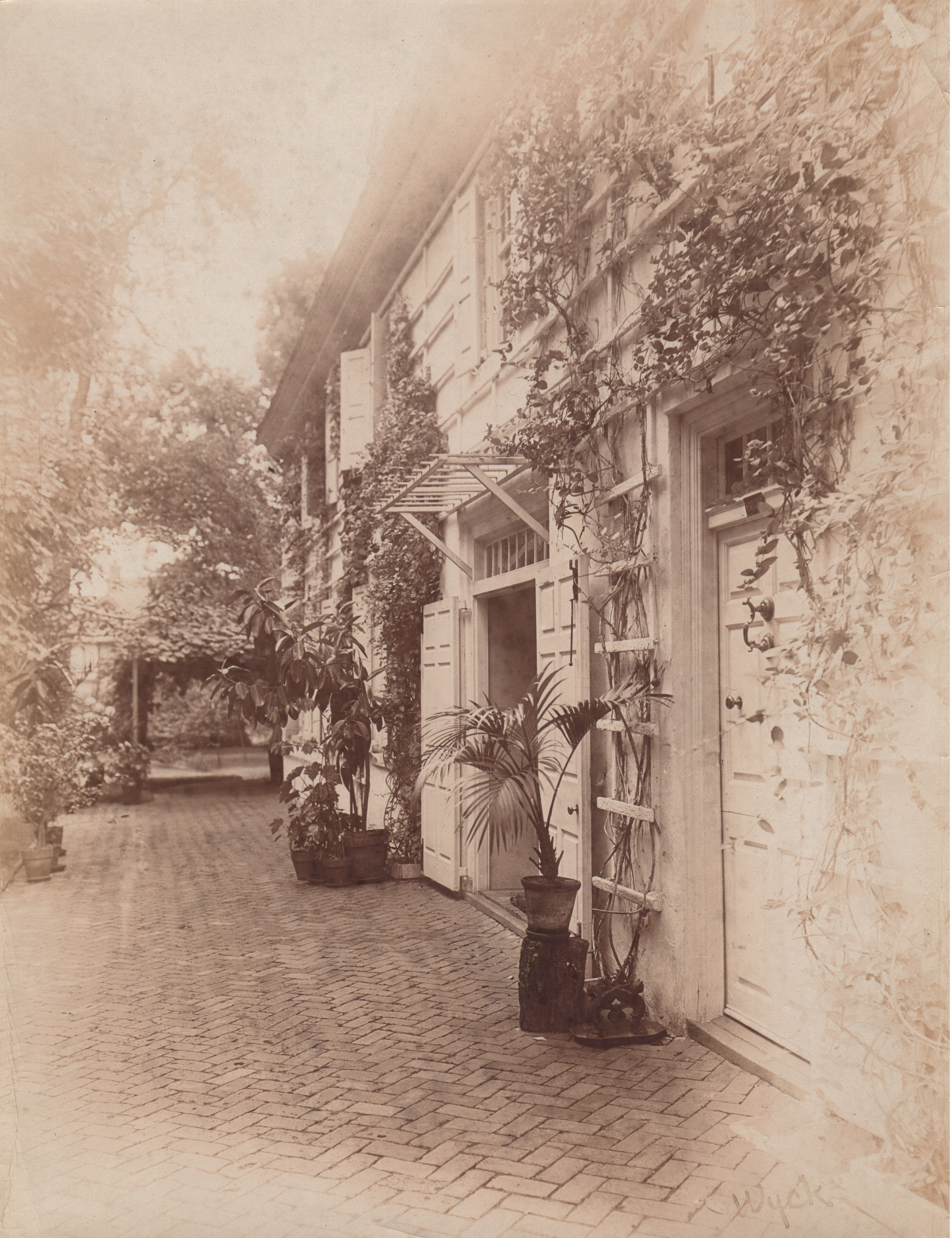
Roses on the front trellis of Wyck c. 1900, facing southwest.

The last owners, Robert B. Haines and his wife Mary (Troth) Haines, were fruit growers. Robert patented a device to press apples for a more natural tasting juice. In 1973, after Robert's death, Mary Haines initiated the transfer of Wyck and its private collections, and since 1978 the site has been run by the Wyck Association. Today, Wyck is maintained as a house museum.

== Architecture ==
Wyck is an architecturally innovative house with an old-fashioned skin. From the outside it appears colonial in plan and design with some fashionable accents such as the late 18th-century whitewashed stucco.

The house is actually an accumulation of 18th-century parts: the hall (c. 1700–1720), the front parlor (1736) and the library and dining room from (1771–1773, which replaced a c. 1690 log structure.)

The house has been little altered since 1824, when Philadelphia architect William Strickland dramatically rearranged its interior spaces to create an open plan, allowing light to flood each room and bringing the pleasures of the garden inside. Strickland also added a set of "folding doors", which swing on a 90-degree angle, allowing the owners to close off two rooms with only one door.

== See also ==
- List of the oldest buildings in Pennsylvania
- List of National Historic Landmarks in Philadelphia
- National Register of Historic Places listings in Northwest Philadelphia
