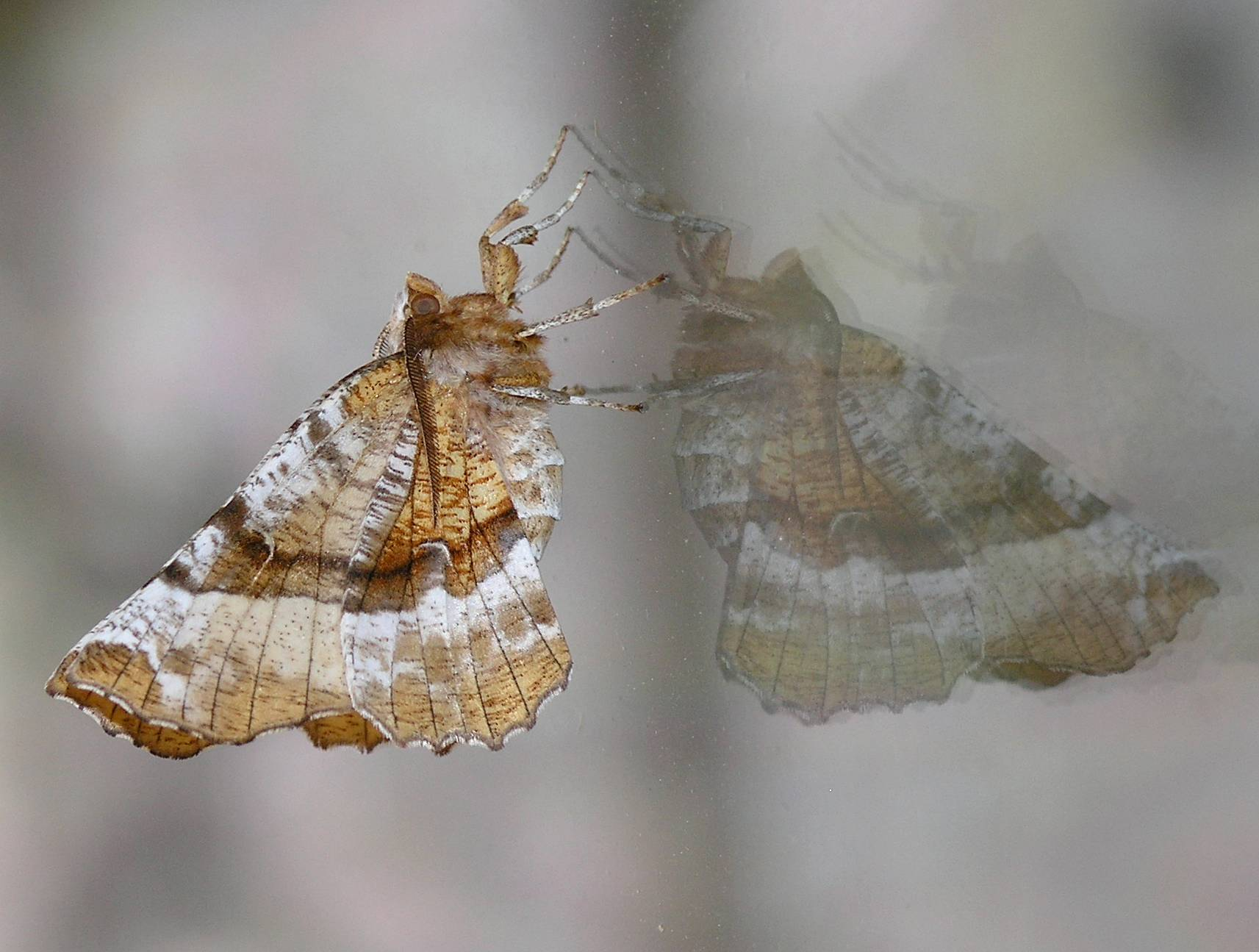

Scientific classification
- Kingdom: Animalia
- Phylum: Arthropoda
- Class: Insecta
- Order: Lepidoptera
- Family: Geometridae
- Genus: Selenia
- Species: S. kentaria

Binomial name
- Selenia kentaria (Grote & Robinson, 1867)

Synonyms
- Selenia glaucata Barnes & McDunnough, 1917 (summer form)

= Selenia kentaria =

Species of moth

Selenia kentaria, commonly known as Kent's thorn or Kent's geometer, is a moth of the family Geometridae. The species was first described by Augustus Radcliffe Grote and Coleman Townsend Robinson in 1867. It is found in eastern and central North America.

The wingspan is 32–52 mm. Adults are on wing from March to August.

The adults mimic wilted leaves, while the larvae resemble twigs.

The larvae feed on several hardwood trees, including Betula and Prunus.

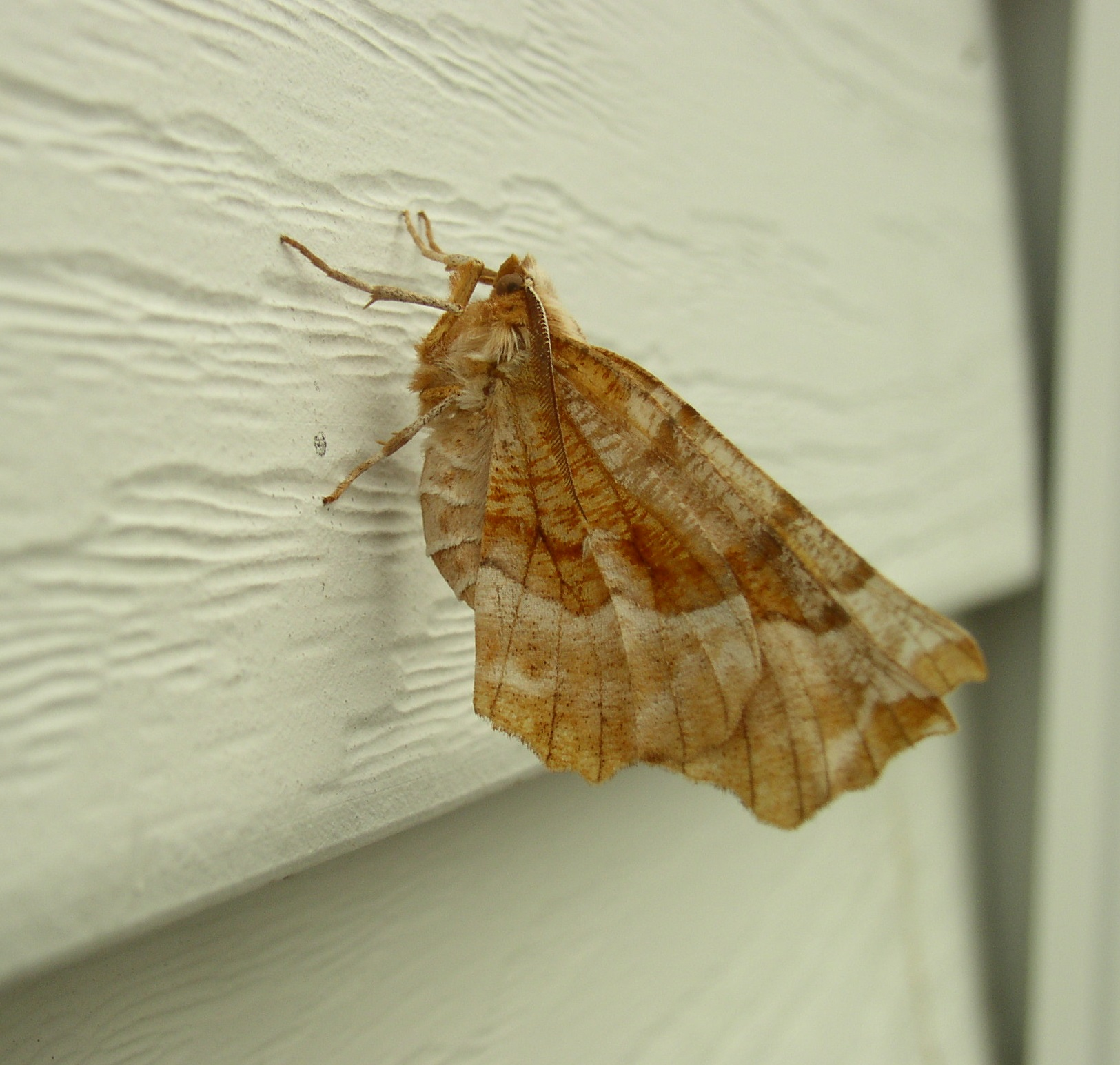
Male
