= Jane B. Haines =

Jane Haines (née Bowne; 1792 – April 26, 1843) was a Quaker educational reformer, horticulturalist, and rosarian from Flushing, Queens, New York.

After 1820, she lived at her husband's family homestead, the historic Wyck House in Germantown, Philadelphia, where she designed a rose garden that is now one of the oldest in the United States. The property that includes the rose garden was designated as a National Historic Landmark on December 14, 1990.

An active member of the Flushing Female Association, Haines donated money and time to establish racially-integrated schools for the poor in New York beginning in 1814.

She became sole proprietor of Wyck after her husband's death in 1831.

== Biography ==
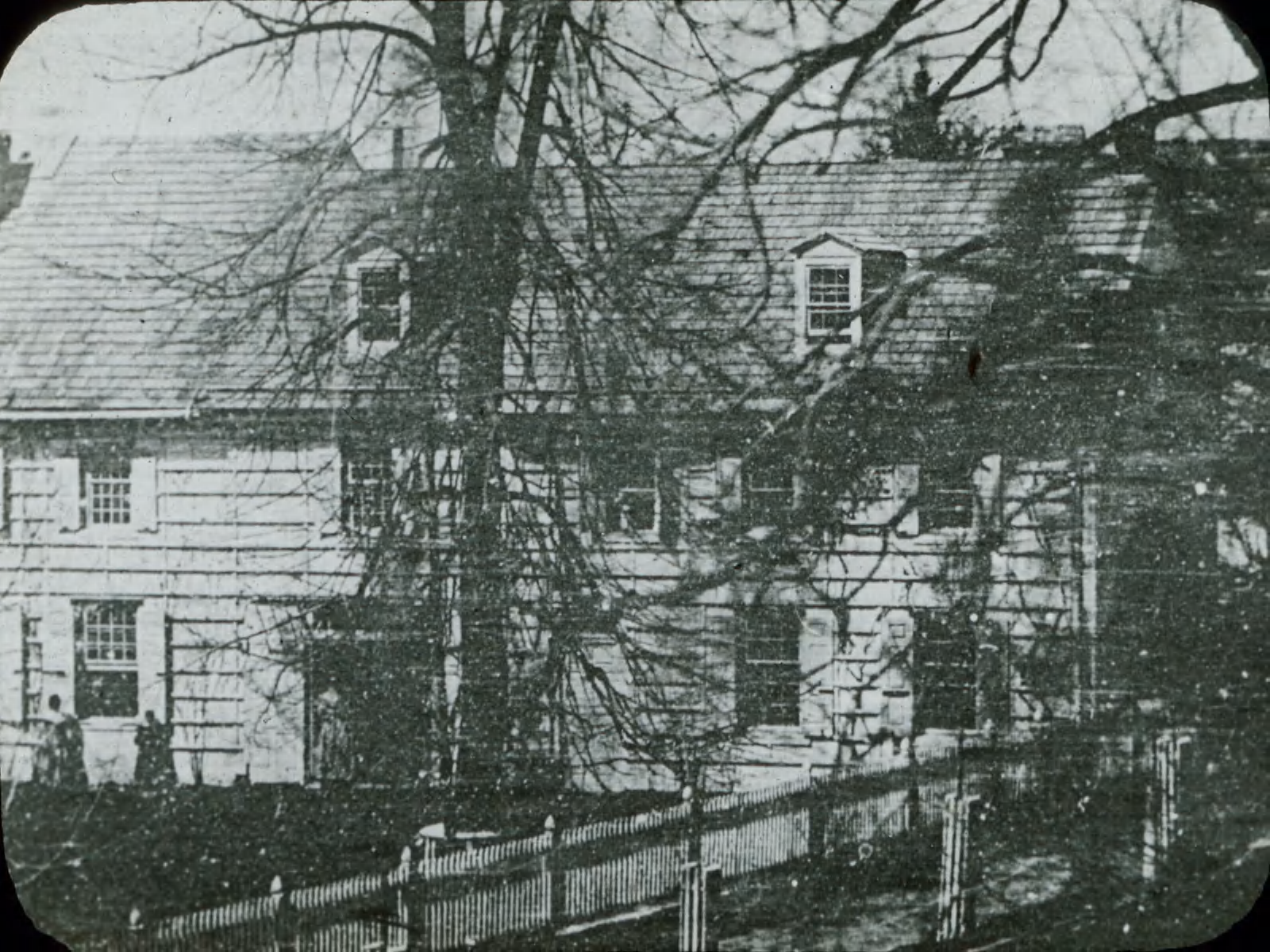
Jane Bowne Haines is presumably one of the women pictured (bottom left) in this daguerreotype taken at Wyck in March 1840 by Prof. Walter R. Johnson. Image transferred to Lantern Slide c.1913 by John G. Bullock (1854-1939). Original in collection of Library Company of Philadelphia.

=== Family ===
Haines was the daughter of Robert Bowne (1744–1818), founder of Bowne & Co., and his wife Elizabeth (Hartshorne) Bowne. She grew up at the historic John Bowne House in Flushing, Queens, New York, which was built by her ancestor John Bowne (1627–1695), the Quaker reformer. George Fox preached in the garden of the Bowne House in 1672.

She married Reuben Haines III (1786–1831), the Quaker scientist and social reformer, in New York on May 12, 1812. They would have nine children:

- Sarah Minturn Haines (b. March 30, 1812)
- Margaret Haines
- Elizabeth Bowne Haines (1817–1891)
- John Smith Haines (1820–1850)
- Hannah Haines (1822–1882)
- Sarah Haines, died in infancy
- Robert Bowne (1827–1895)
- Margaret "Meta" Haines (1830–1878)
- Jane Reuben Haines (1832–1911), inherited Wyck after her mother's death.

== Wyck Rose Garden ==
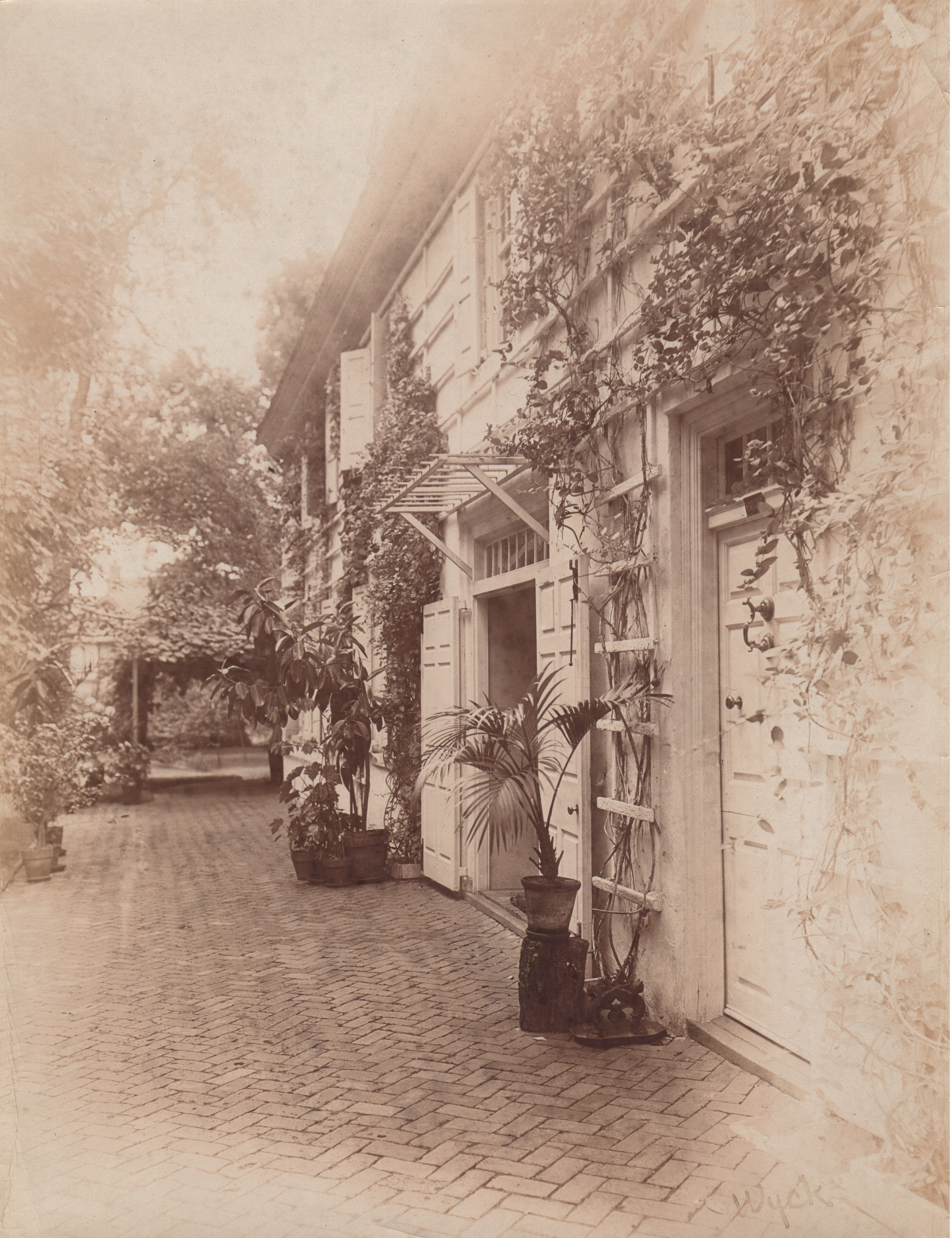
Antique roses growing on the trellis on the front of the Wyck House, c. 1900.

Haines designed the rose garden at Wyck in 1821, on the site of an 18th-century kitchen garden maintained by her mother-in-law Hannah (Marshall) Haines (1765–1828).

Her daughter, Jane R. Haines, reminisced about the origins of the garden in a letter dated March 3, 1908:

"I believe that my old garden was laid out by my mother, Mrs. Jane Bowne Haines, as I have a rough sketch with notes in her hand. I presume it was about 1821 or '22, as that was the time that my parents removed to Wyck permanently, having previously only resided here in summer. I remember when the asparagus bed, surrounded by currant bushes, still occupied the plot by the street where the hedge now is. At that time the paths were still covered with tan from Eagle's old tannery."

The Wyck rose garden was surveyed in 1976 by the late rosarian Leonie Bell, who identified dozens of varieties of antique roses at the site. Two notable finds were the “Elegant Gallica”, previously thought to be extinct in cultivation, and the “Lafayette”, which Bell speculated was named in honor of the Marquis de Lafayette to commemorate his 1825 visit to Wyck.
