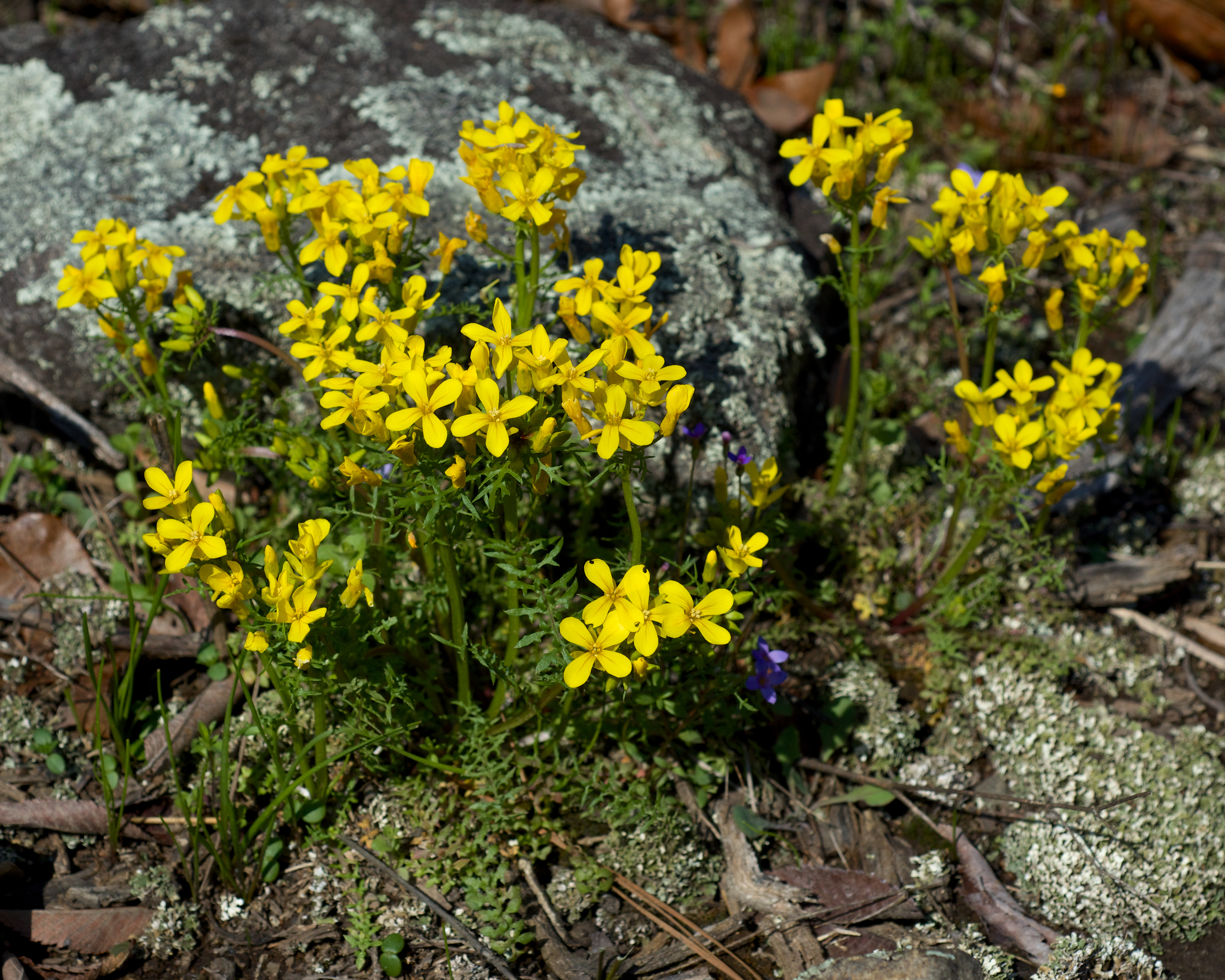

Scientific classification
- Kingdom: Plantae
- Clade: Tracheophytes
- Clade: Angiosperms
- Clade: Eudicots
- Clade: Rosids
- Order: Brassicales
- Family: Brassicaceae
- Genus: Selenia
- Species: S. aurea

Binomial name
- Selenia aurea Nutt.

= Selenia aurea =

Species of flowering plant

Selenia aurea, the golden selenia, is a flowering plant in the mustard family (Brassicaceae). It is endemic to the southern United States where it grows in sunny prairies, barrens, and glades of Arkansas, Kansas, Missouri, and Oklahoma. It flowers between March and May.

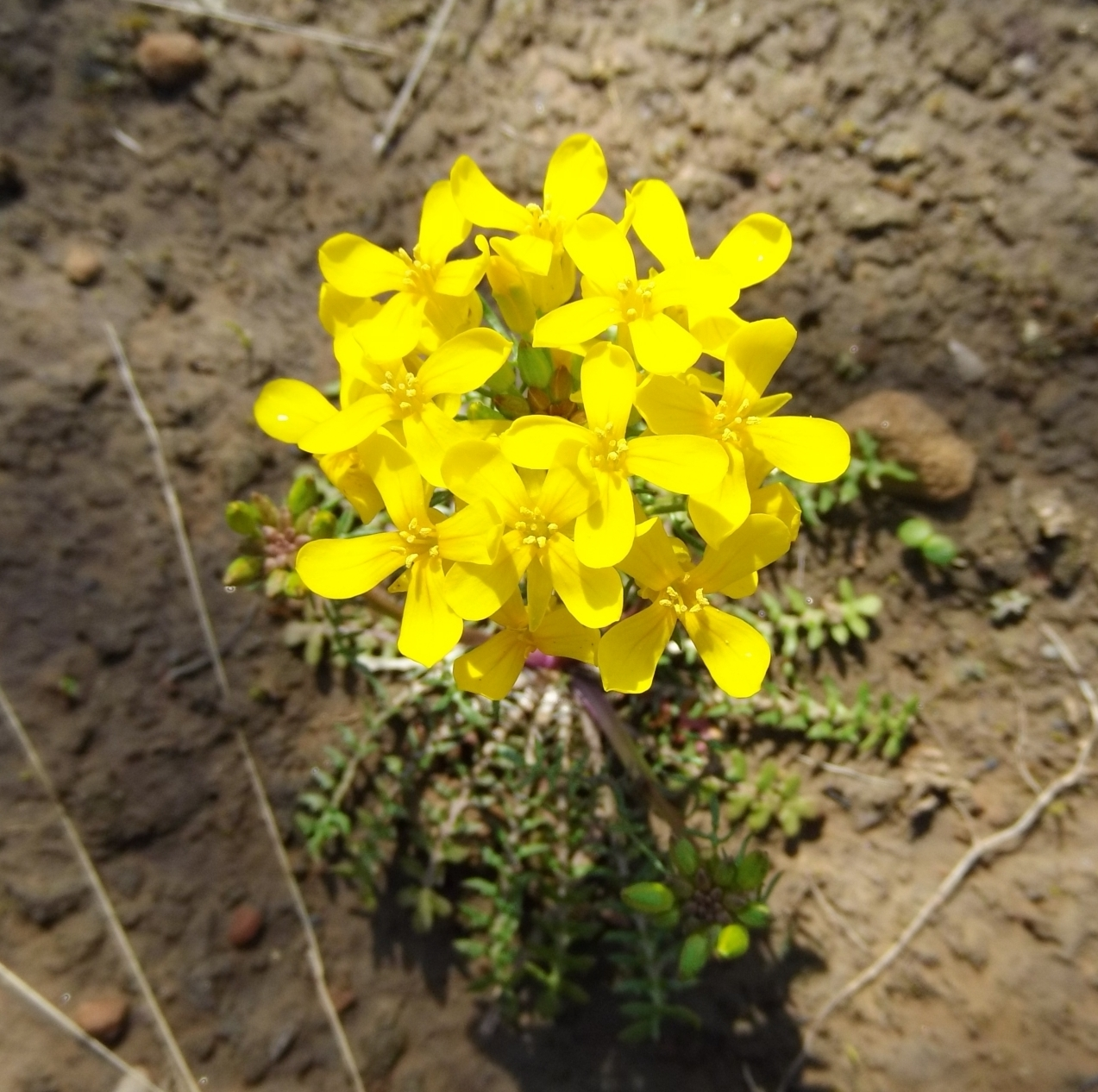
In Osage County, Oklahoma
