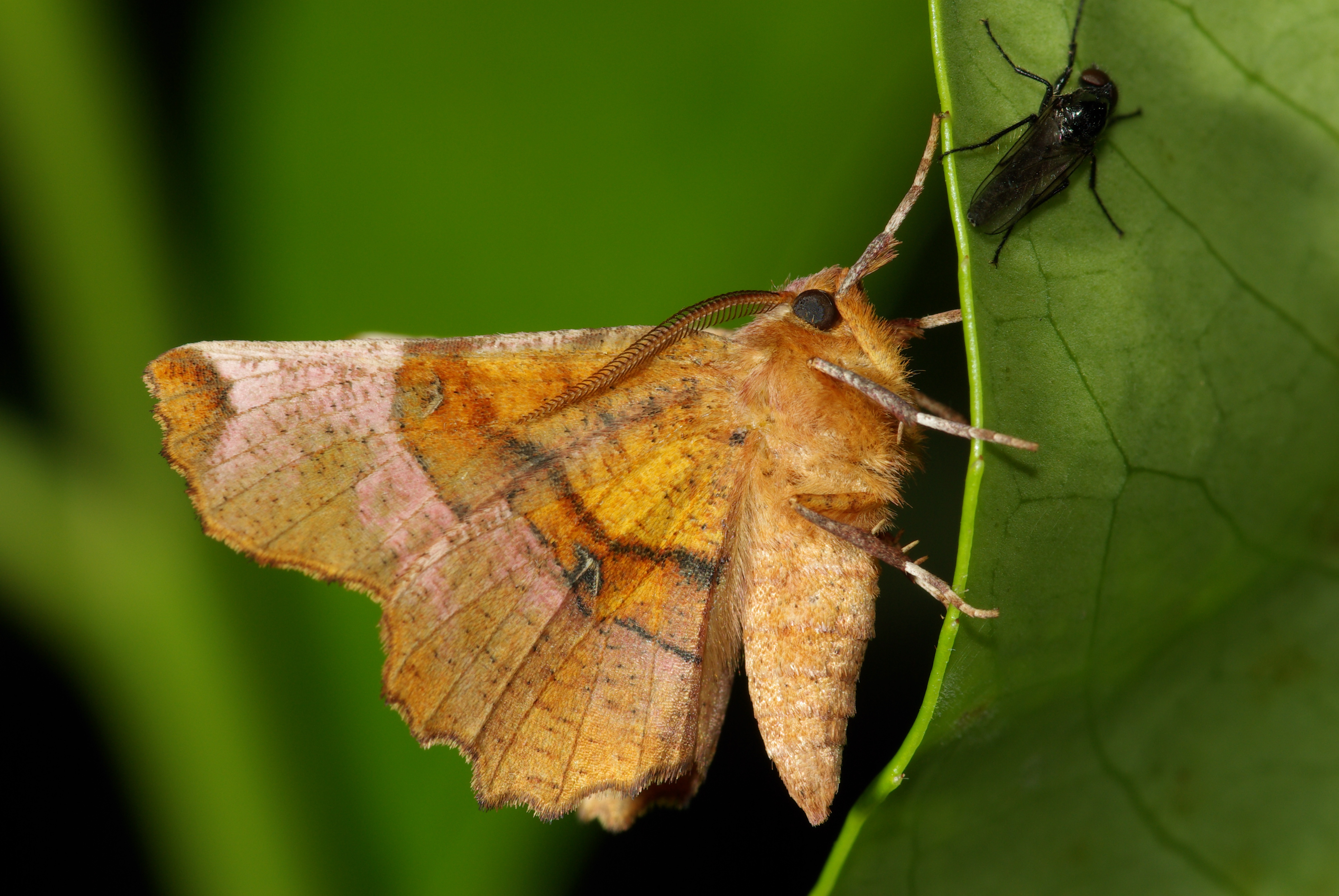
- Selenia lunularia

Scientific classification
- Domain: Eukaryota
- Kingdom: Animalia
- Phylum: Arthropoda
- Class: Insecta
- Order: Lepidoptera
- Family: Geometridae
- Tribe: Ennomini
- Genus: Selenia; Hübner, 1823

= Selenia (moth) =

Genus of moths

Selenia is a genus of moths in the family Geometridae erected by Jacob Hübner in 1823. In 1999, there were about twenty-four species in the genus.

== Species ==
- Selenia alciphearia Walker, 1860 - brown-tipped thorn, northern selenia
- Selenia cacocore Dyar, 1918
- Selenia dentaria (Fabricius, 1775) - early thorn
- Selenia eucore Dyar, 1918
- Selenia gynaecon Dyar, 1918
- Selenia kentaria (Grote & Robinson, 1867) - Kent's geometer
- Selenia lunularia (Hübner, 1788) - lunar thorn
- Selenia sordida (Leech, 1897)
- Selenia tetralunaria (Hufnagel, 1767) - purple thorn
