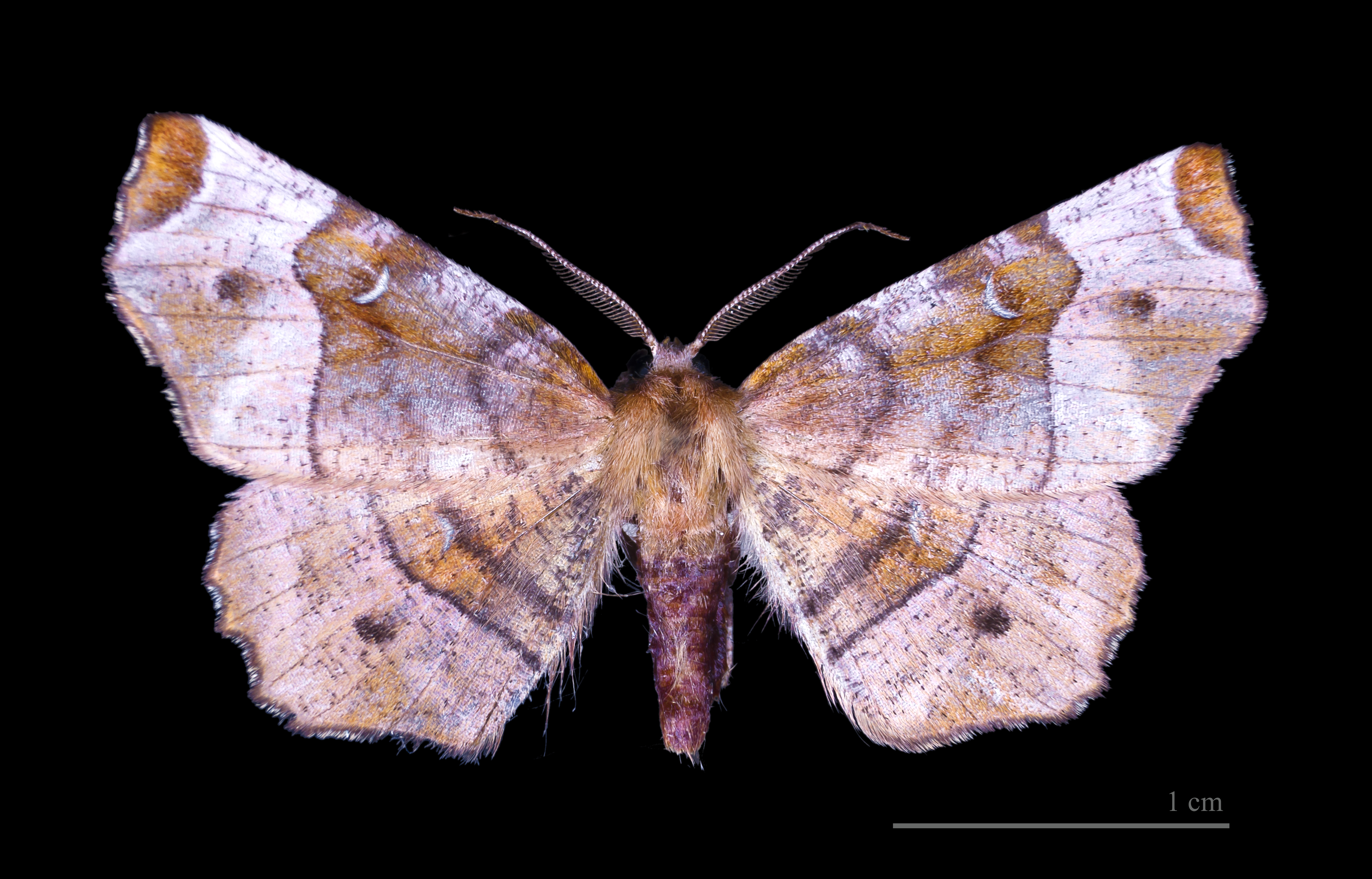

Scientific classification
- Domain: Eukaryota
- Kingdom: Animalia
- Phylum: Arthropoda
- Class: Insecta
- Order: Lepidoptera
- Family: Geometridae
- Genus: Selenia
- Species: S. tetralunaria

Binomial name
- Selenia tetralunaria (Hufnagel, 1767)

= Purple thorn =

Species of moth

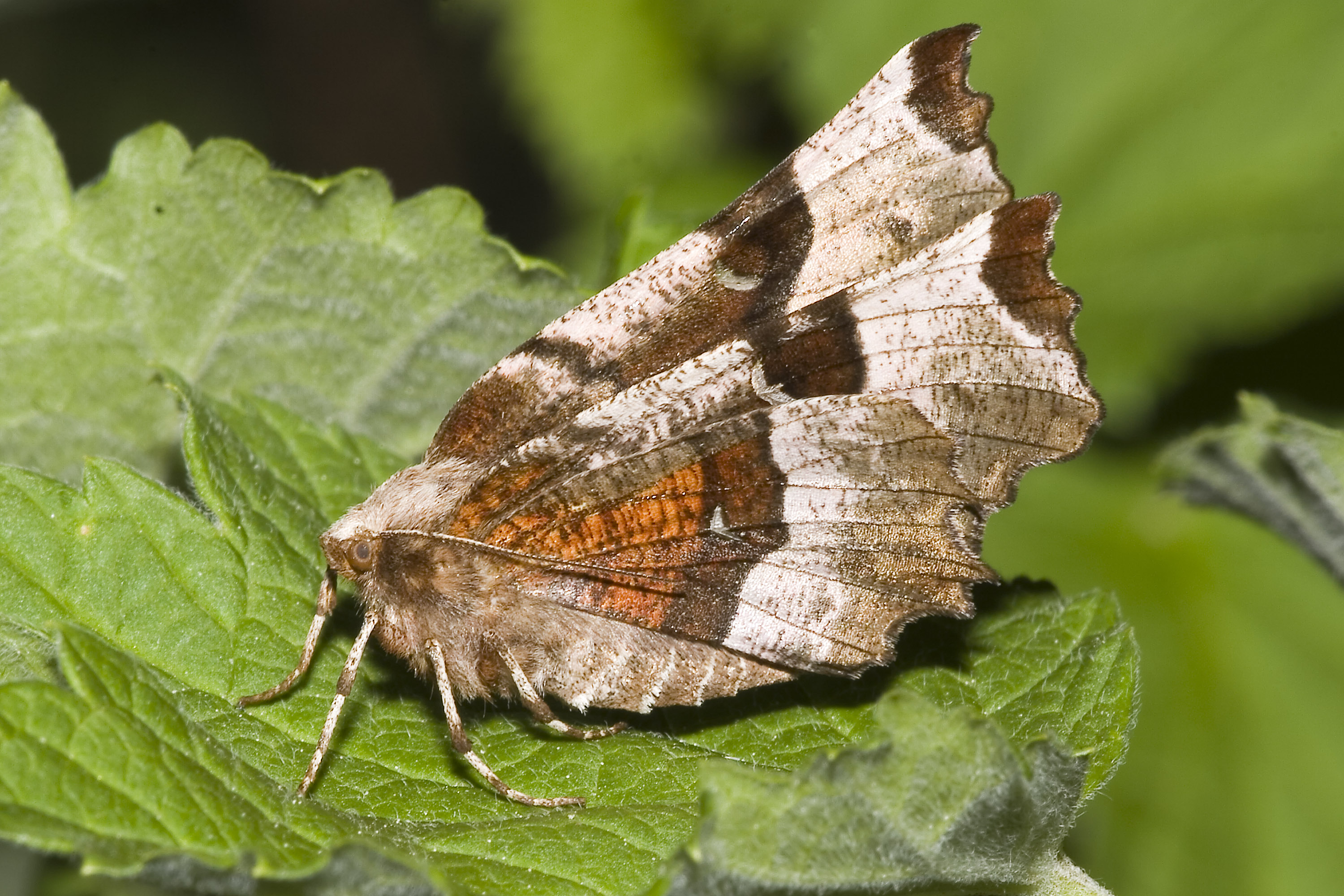

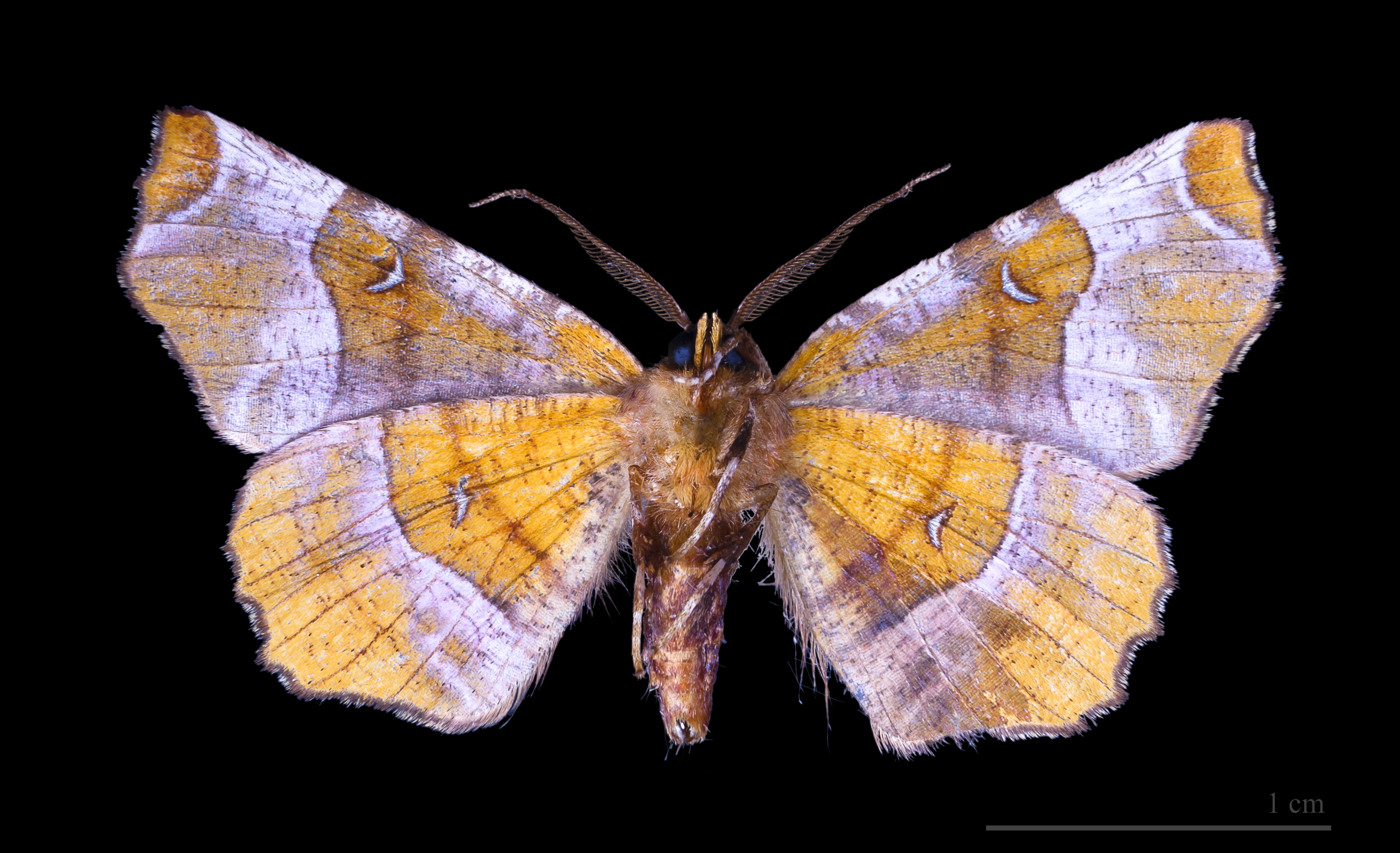
Male underside

The purple thorn (Selenia tetralunaria) is a moth of the family Geometridae. The species was first described by Johann Siegfried Hufnagel in 1767. It is a species of both Northern Europe and Central Europe. It has a scattered distribution in Britain but is absent from Ireland.

This species is dark purplish brown, paler towards the termen, with a dark spot at the apex of the forewing. Both wings are marked with a comma-shaped white mark. The margins of the wings are angular, giving the species a distinctive shape. Two broods are produced each year and they differ considerably in size and colour. Adults of the spring brood, which fly in April and May, have a wingspan of 46–52 mm. Moths of the summer brood, flying in July and August, are smaller (wingspan 44–46 mm) and darker. The caterpillar is reddish brown, mottled with darker brown, and with pale greyish.

The species flies at night and is attracted to light.

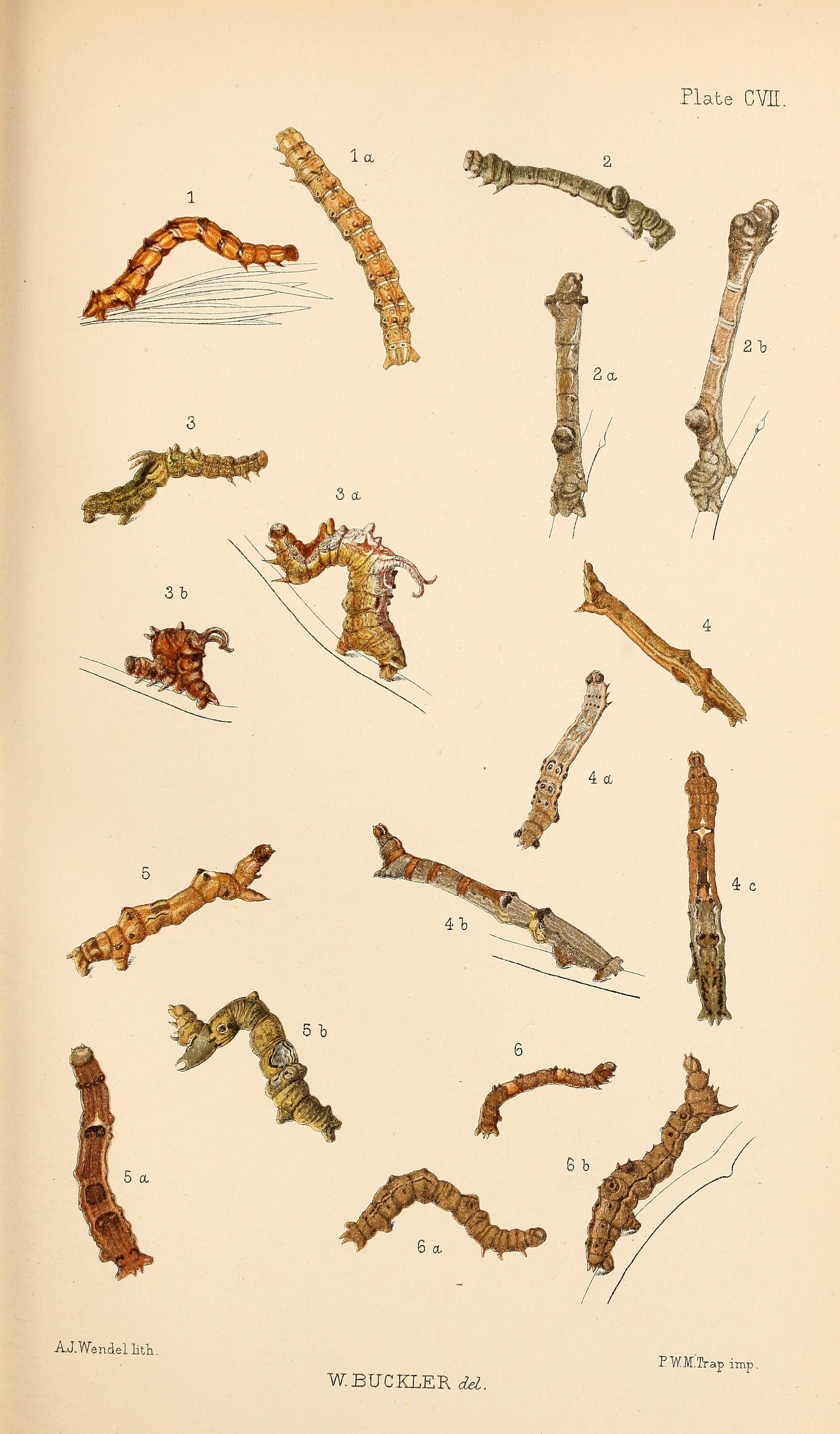
Fig 6 6a, 6b Larvae in various stages

The caterpillar feeds on a variety of trees and shrubs (see list below). The species overwinters as a pupa.

== Notes ==
1. The flight season refers to the British Isles. This may vary in other parts of the range.

== Recorded food plants ==
- Alnus – alder
- Betula – birch
- Fraxinus – European ash
- Malus – apple
- Populus – black poplar
- Prunus
- Pyrus – pear
- Quercus – oak
- Rosa – rose
