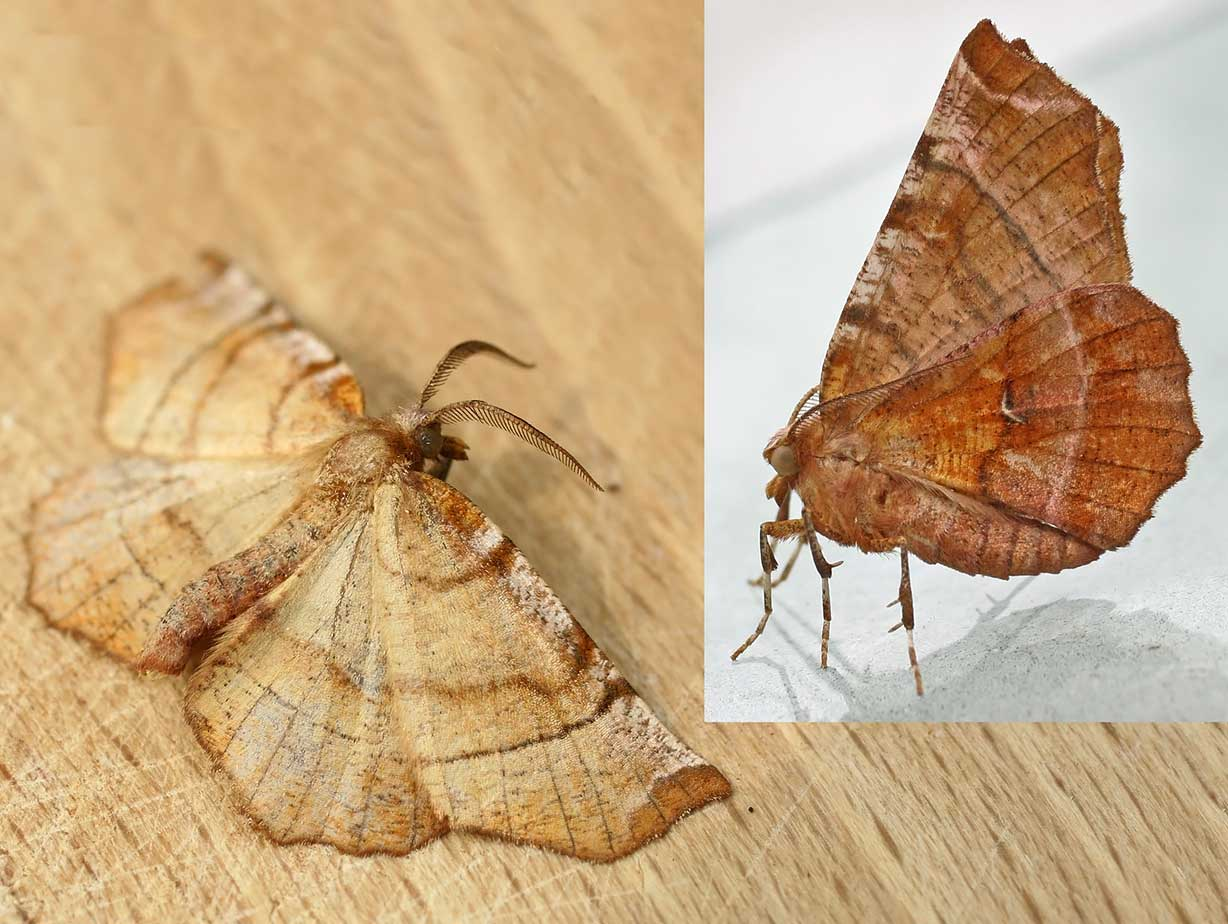

Scientific classification
- Kingdom: Animalia
- Phylum: Arthropoda
- Clade: Pancrustacea
- Class: Insecta
- Order: Lepidoptera
- Family: Geometridae
- Genus: Selenia
- Species: S. dentaria

Binomial name
- Selenia dentaria (Fabricius, 1775)

= Selenia dentaria =

Species of moth

Selenia dentaria, the early thorn, is a moth of the family Geometridae. It is found in Northern Europe, and across the Palearctic to the Caucasus, Transcaucasia, North Siberia, Russian Far East, Amur and Mongolia.

== Description ==
The wingspan is 28–40 mm. The wings are scalloped and there are 3 crosslines on the forewings. There is a dark stain at the apex of the forewing. Adults are extremely variable in colour. Distinguished by the less deep excision between the radials of the hindwing, less rich colouring, enlarged costal spots at the origin of the lines, a median area not differentiated in colour from the distal area, transparent discal marks not well developed. The spring form is large, strongly irrorated with fuscous, sometimes more olivaceous.the median and postmedian lines darkened into a band. -ab. illunaria Esp. is the summer generation, much smaller and much lees irrorated. Sometimes pale, sometimes warmer brown. - ab. minima Strand is a dwarfed form, sometimes sharply marked, frequent in Arctic Norway.

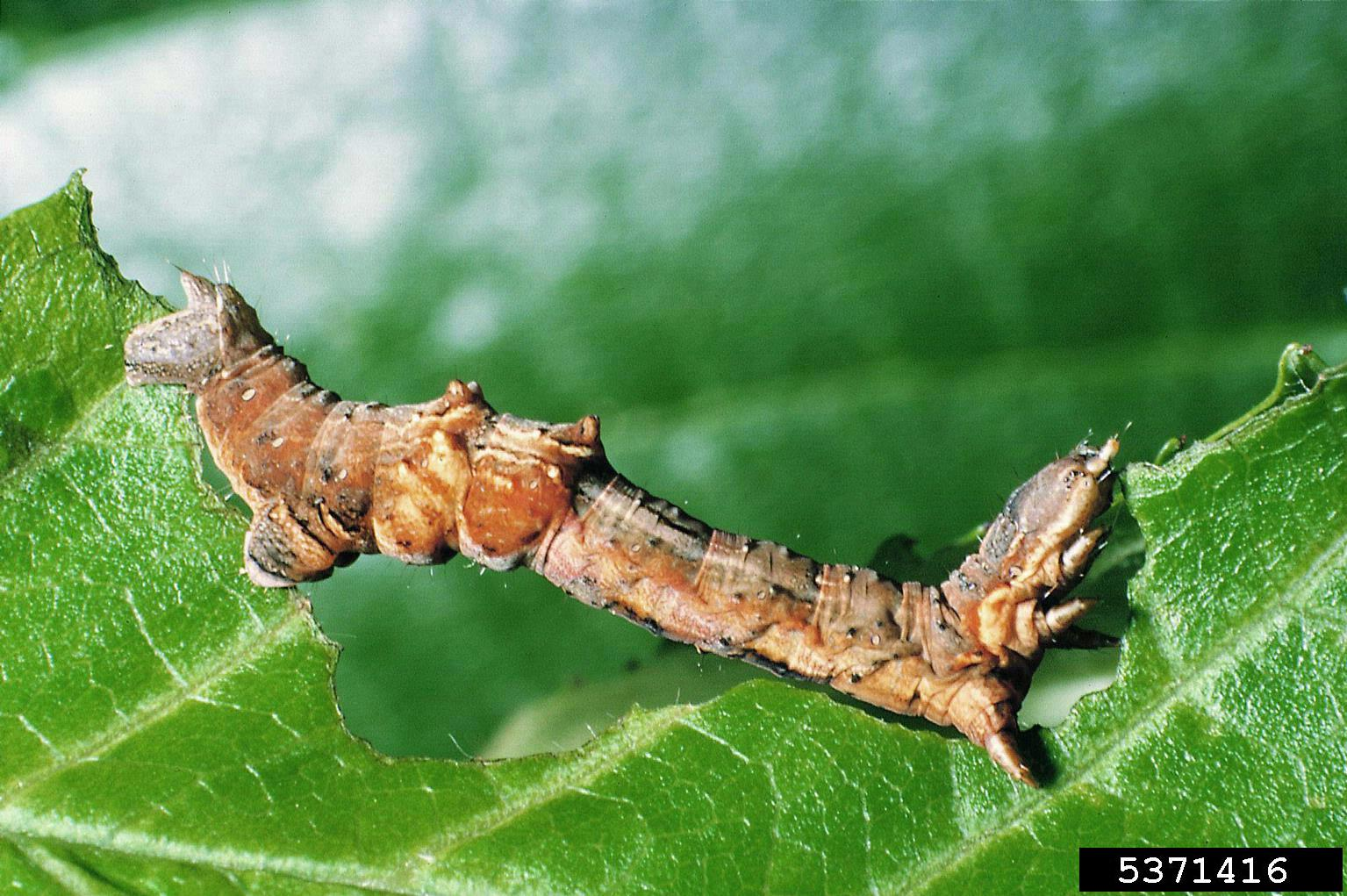
Caterpillar

The larva is orange-brown or reddish brown, sometimes inclining to purplish; mepo- and metathorax enlarged laterally, 4th—5th abdominal swollen, with small dorsal humps; anterior segments marked with bright orange.

== Biology ==
The moth flies in two generation from April to August.

The larvae feed on various deciduous trees, such as birch and alder.

== Notes ==
1. The flight season refers to Belgium and The Netherlands. This may vary in other parts of the range.
