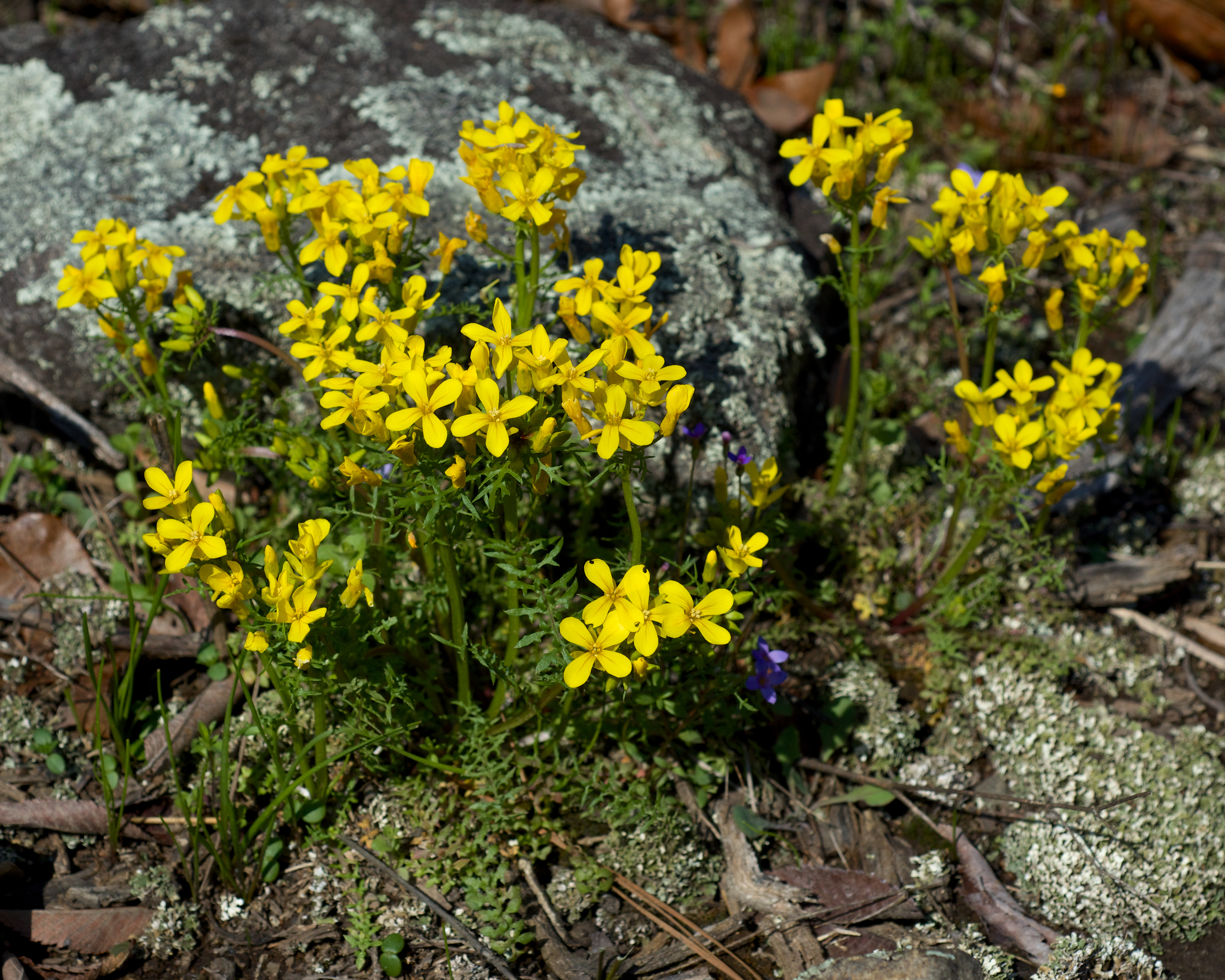
- Selenia aurea

Scientific classification
- Kingdom: Plantae
- Clade: Tracheophytes
- Clade: Angiosperms
- Clade: Eudicots
- Clade: Rosids
- Order: Brassicales
- Family: Brassicaceae
- Tribe: Cardamineae
- Genus: Selenia; Nutt.

= Selenia (plant) =

Genus of flowering plants

Selenia is a genus of flowering plants in the family Brassicaceae. It includes four species native to the central and south-central United States and northeastern Mexico.

== Species ==
Four species are accepted.

- Selenia aurea Nutt. – Arkansas, Kansas, Missouri, and Oklahoma
- Selenia dissecta Torr. & A.Gray – northeastern Mexico, New Mexico, and Texas
- Selenia grandis R.F.Martin – Texas
- Selenia jonesii Cory – Texas
