= A. aenigma =

A. aenigma may refer to:

- Abacetus aenigma, an Asian ground beetle
- Acrodontis aenigma, a Taiwanese moth
- Asymphorodes aenigma, a French Polynesian moth
