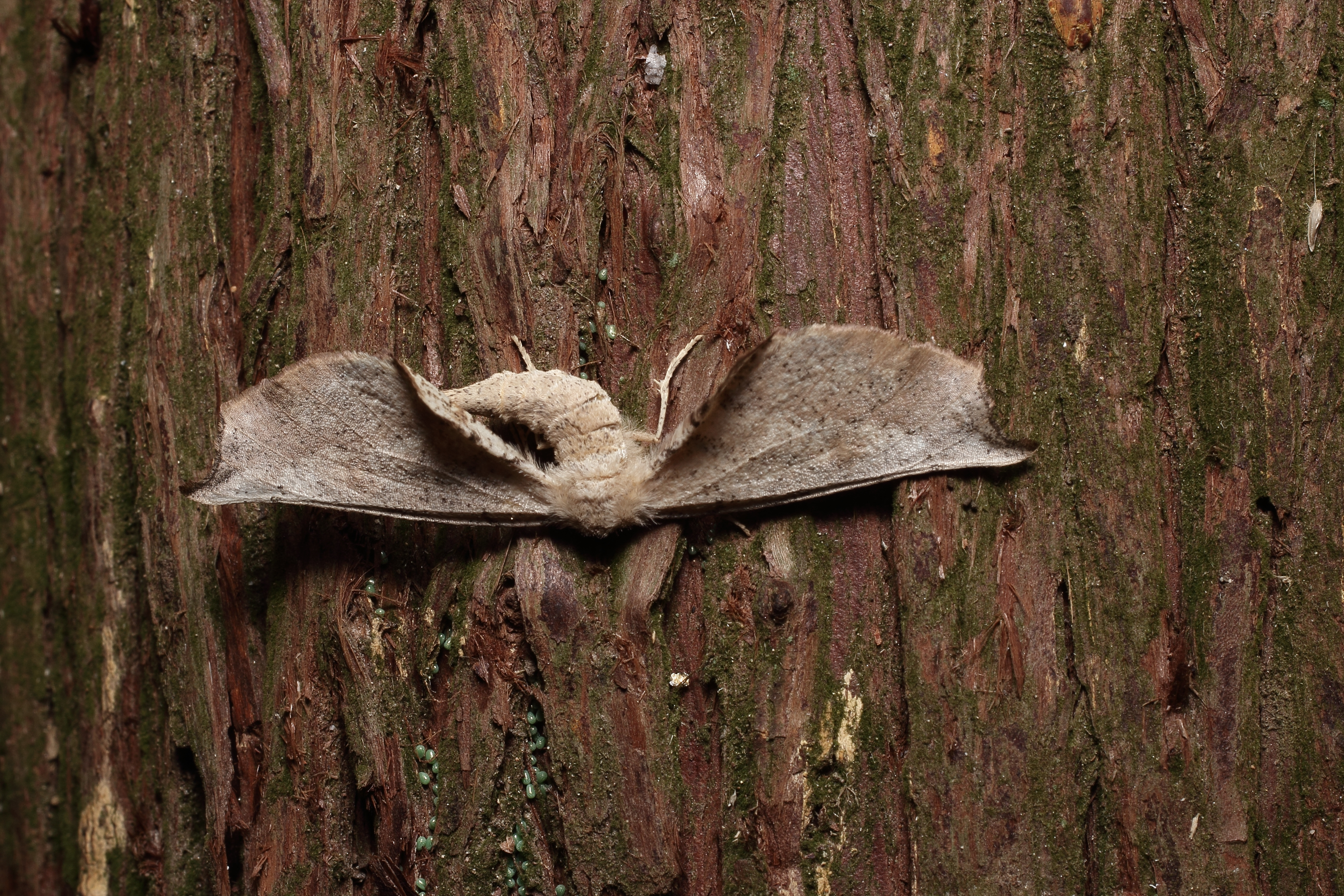
- Acrodontis kotshubeji

Scientific classification
- Kingdom: Animalia
- Phylum: Arthropoda
- Class: Insecta
- Order: Lepidoptera
- Family: Geometridae
- Tribe: Ourapterygini
- Genus: Acrodontis; Wehrli, 1931

= Acrodontis =

Genus of geometer moths

Acrodontis is a genus of moths in the family Geometridae.

== Species ==
- Acrodontis aenigma (Prout, 1914)
- Acrodontis fumosa (Prout, 1930)
- Acrodontis hunana Wehrli, 1936
- Acrodontis insularis Holloway, 1993
- Acrodontis kotschubeji Sheljuzhko, 1944
- Acrodontis tanchame Kobayashi, 1995
- Acrodontis tsinlingensis Beyer, 1958
- Acrodontis yazakii Kobayashi, 1995
