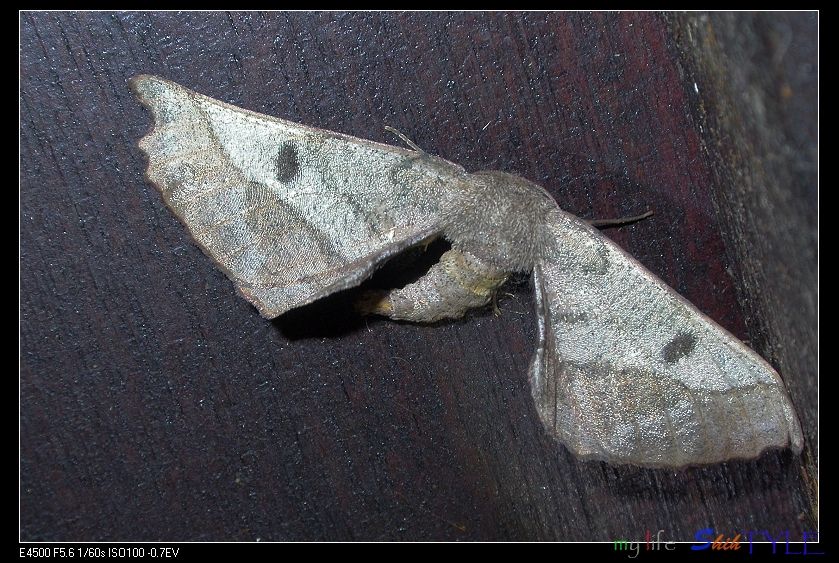

Scientific classification
- Kingdom: Animalia
- Phylum: Arthropoda
- Clade: Pancrustacea
- Class: Insecta
- Order: Lepidoptera
- Family: Geometridae
- Genus: Acrodontis
- Species: A. aenigma

Binomial name
- Acrodontis aenigma (Prout, 1914)

Synonyms
- Ennomos aenigma Prout, 1914

= Acrodontis aenigma =

Species of moth

Acrodontis aenigma is a species of moth in the family Geometridae. It is found in Taiwan.
