= Abacetus aenigma =

Scientific classification
- Kingdom: Animalia
- Phylum: Arthropoda
- Clade: Pancrustacea
- Class: Insecta
- Order: Coleoptera
- Suborder: Adephaga
- Family: Carabidae
- Genus: Abacetus
- Species: A. aenigma

Binomial name
- Abacetus aenigma Chaudoir, 1869

Species of beetle

Abacetus aenigma is a species of ground beetle in the subfamily Pterostichinae. It was described by Maximilien Chaudoir in 1869. The species is found in the Cambodia, Vietnam, Laos, and China.
