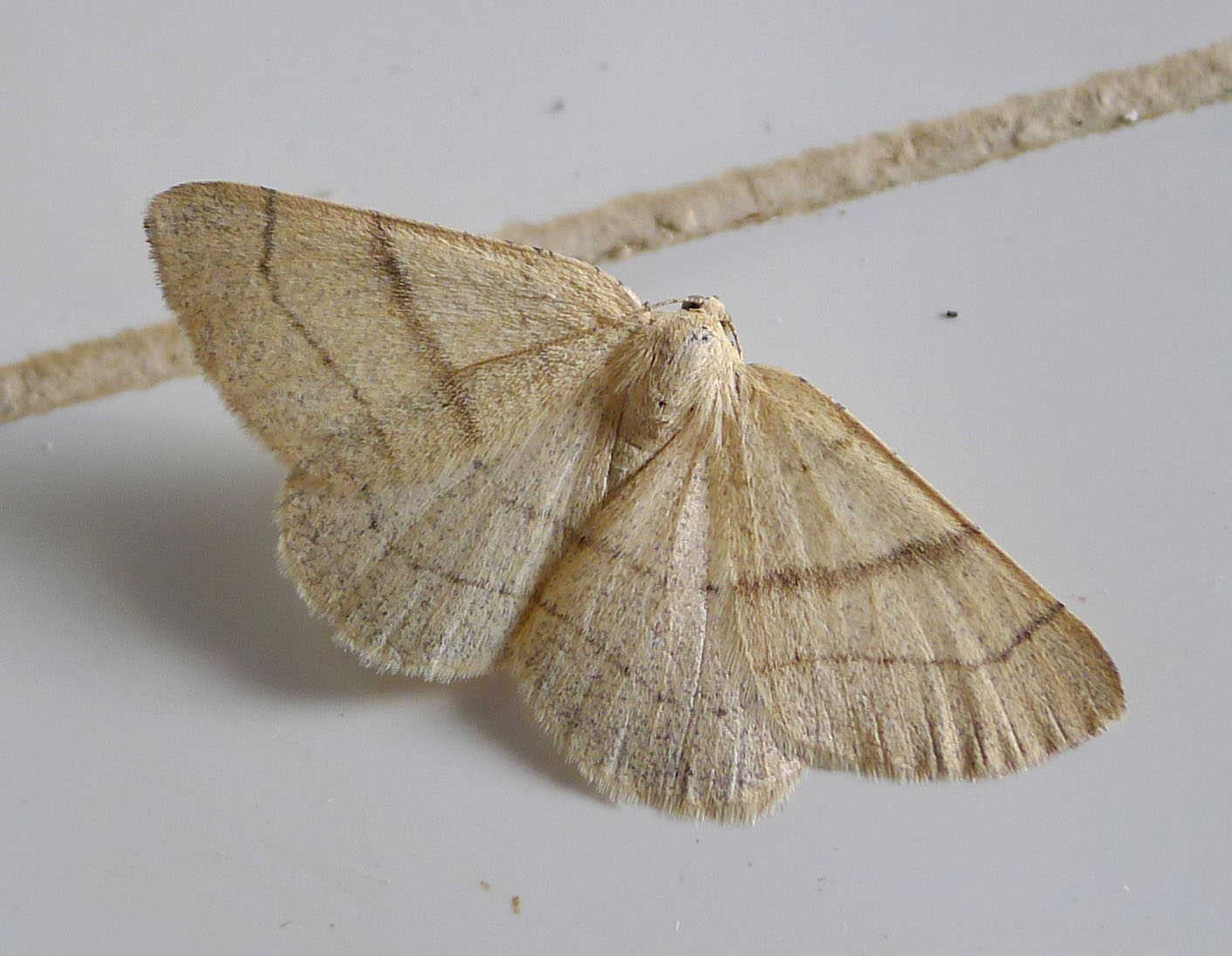
- Adactylotis gesticularia

Scientific classification
- Kingdom: Animalia
- Phylum: Arthropoda
- Clade: Pancrustacea
- Class: Insecta
- Order: Lepidoptera
- Family: Geometridae
- Tribe: Boarmiini
- Genus: Adactylotis; Hübner, 1823

= Adactylotis =

Genus of geometer moths

Adactylotis is a genus of moths in the family Geometridae.

== Species ==
- Adactylotis contaminaria (Hübner, 1813)
- Adactylotis gesticularia (Hübner, 1817)
