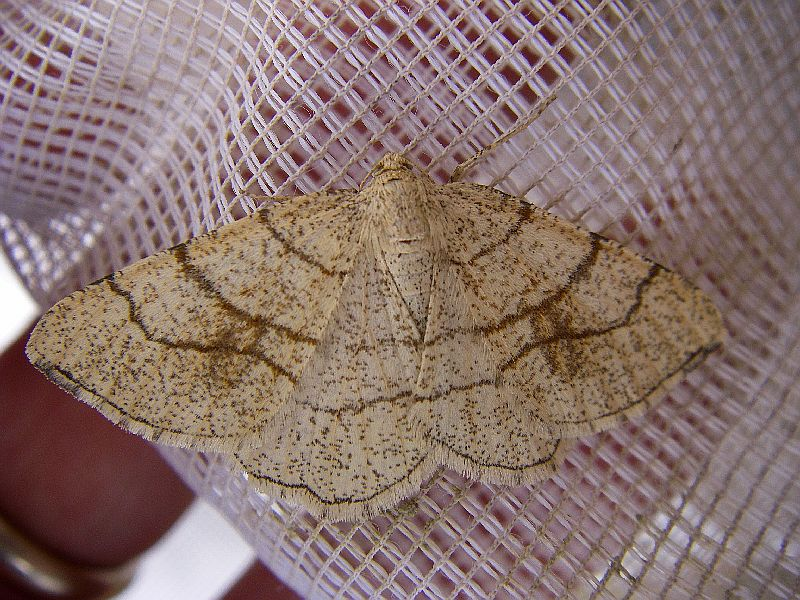

Scientific classification
- Domain: Eukaryota
- Kingdom: Animalia
- Phylum: Arthropoda
- Class: Insecta
- Order: Lepidoptera
- Family: Geometridae
- Genus: Adactylotis
- Species: A. contaminaria

Binomial name
- Adactylotis contaminaria (Hübner, 1813)

Synonyms
- Geometra contaminaria Hübner, 1813

= Adactylotis contaminaria =

Species of moth

Adactylotis contaminaria, the brindled three-lined moth, is a species of moth in the family Geometridae. It is found in Belgium, France, Spain, Switzerland and Italy.

The wingspan is 38–44 mm. Adults are on wing from April to May and again from September to October in two generations per year.

The larvae feed on Quercus species.
