= List of geometrid genera: M =

The very large moth family Geometridae contains genera beginning with A, B, C, D, E, F, G, H, I, J, K, L, M, N, O, P, Q, R, S, T, U, V, W, X, Y and Z.

Those beginning with M include:

- Macaria
- Macqueenia
- Macrohastina
- Macrolyrcea
- Macropitthea
- Macrotes
- Macroxystra
- Maeandrogonaria
- Maesia
- Magida
- Maidana
- Malacodea
- Malacuncina
- Malenydris
- Malgassorhoe
- Malgassothisa
- Malleco
- Mallomus
- Manonida
- Marcala
- Marcodava
- Mariaba
- Marmarea
- Marmopteryx
- Marobia
- Martindoelloia
- Marumona
- Matanga
- Mauna
- Maxates
- Medasina
- Megabiston
- Megadrepana
- Megaloba
- Megalochlora
- Megalotica
- Megalycinia
- Megametopon
- Megaspilates
- Megatheca
- Megazancla
- Meganupiru
- Meichihuo
- Melanchroia
- Melandia
- Melanodes
- Melanolophia
- Melanoptilon
- Melanoscia
- Melanotesia
- Melanthia
- Melemaea
- Melinodes
- Melinoessa
- Melitulias
- Mellilla
- Melochlora
- Mennis
- Menophra
- Mergana
- Mericisca
- Merida
- Meris
- Merocausta
- Merochlora
- Mesaster
- Mesastrape
- Mesedra
- Mesobomba
- Mesocoela
- Mesocolpia
- Mesohypoleuca
- Mesoleuca
- Mesomima
- Mesoptila
- Mesothea
- Mesothisa
- Mesotrophe
- Mesotype
- Mesurodes
- Metabraxas
- Metacrocallis
- Metallaxis
- Metallochlora
- Metallolophia
- Metallospora
- Metallothea
- Metanema
- Metapercnia
- Metarranthis
- Metasiopsis
- Metaterpna
- Meteima
- Methydata
- Meticulodes
- Metoxydia
- Metriocera
- Meyrickia
- Miantochora
- Miantonota
- Micrabraxas
- Microbaena
- Microbiston
- Microcalcarifera
- Microcalicha
- Microclysia
- Microdes
- Microdontopera
- Microglossotrophia
- Microgonia
- Microligia
- Microloxia
- Microlyces
- Microlygris
- Micromia
- Micronidia
- Micronissa
- Microplutodes
- Microsema
- Microtome
- Microxena
- Microxydia
- Micrulia
- Mictodoca
- Mictoschema
- Middletonia
- Milionia
- Milocera
- Mimaletis
- Mimandria
- Mimaplasta
- Mimocharis
- Mimochroa
- Mimoclystia
- Mimogonodes
- Mimomanes
- Mimomiza
- Mimomma
- Mimophyle
- Mimoprora
- Mimosema
- Minoa
- Minyolophia
- Mirifica
- Mixeophanes
- Mixocera
- Mixochlora
- Mixochroa
- Mixolophia
- Mixopsis
- Mnesampela
- Mnesigea
- Mnesiloba
- Mnesipenthe
- Mnesithetis
- Mnesterodes
- Mniocera
- Mochlotona
- Molybdogompha
- Moneta
- Monocerotesa
- Monochyria
- Monoctenia
- Monoctophora
- Monostoecha
- Monotaxia
- Monroa
- Morina
- Mucronodes
- Mujiaoshakua
- Mychonia
- Myinodes
- Myrice
- Myrioblephara
- Myrmecophantes
- Myrteta
- Mystichlora
