= Malleco =

Malleco may refer to

Things in Chile

- Malleco Province
- Malleco River
- Malleco Viaduct

Other

- Malleco (moth), a moth genus
