= Moneta (disambiguation) =

Moneta is a Roman goddess who was the personification of riches and wealth.

Moneta may also refer to:

== Places ==
- Moneta, California, United States
- Moneta, Iowa, United States
- Moneta, Virginia, United States

== Species ==
- Moneta (moth), a genus of moth in the family Geometridae
- Moneta (spider), a genus of spider in the family Theridiidae
- Cypraea moneta, a marine gastropod

== Other ==
- Moneta (name)
