= Matanga =

Matanga (Mātaṅga Sanskrit: मातंग) may refer to:

- Hilary Matanga (born 1984), Zimbabwean cricketer
- Kasyapa Matanga (fl. 67 CE), Indian Buddhist monk
- Matanga (moth), a genus of family Geometridae
- Matanga Muni, author of the Brihaddeshi, an early treatise on classical Indian music
- Matanga, Madagascar
- Matanga Hill, Karnataka, India
- Matangi, Tantric goddess

== See also ==
- Matang (disambiguation)
- Matangi (disambiguation)
