= Roman Catholic Archdiocese of Mérida =

Roman Catholic Archdiocese of Mérida may refer to:

- Roman Catholic Archdiocese of Mérida–Badajoz, Spain
- Roman Catholic Archdiocese of Mérida in Venezuela

== See also ==
- Mérida (disambiguation)
