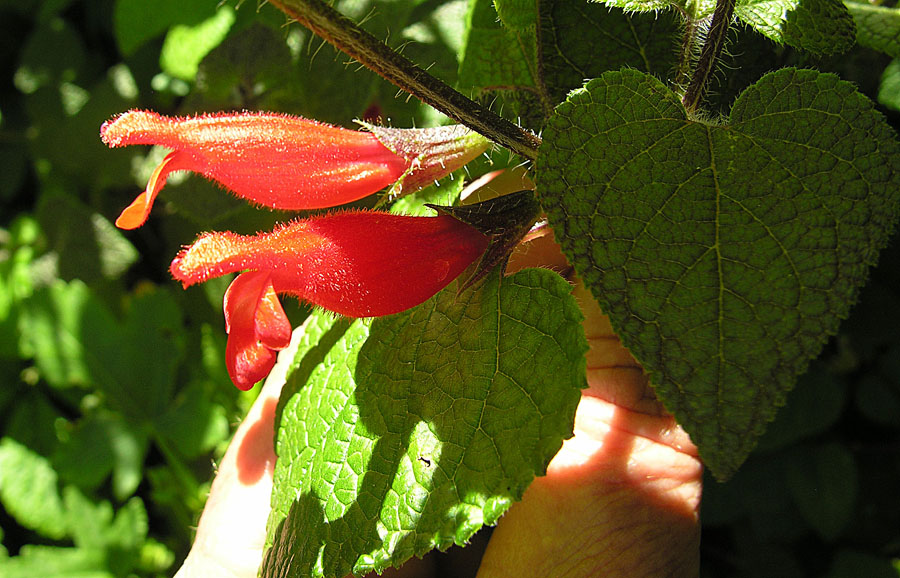

Scientific classification
- Kingdom: Plantae
- Clade: Embryophytes
- Clade: Tracheophytes
- Clade: Spermatophytes
- Clade: Angiosperms
- Clade: Eudicots
- Clade: Asterids
- Order: Lamiales
- Family: Lamiaceae
- Genus: Salvia
- Species: S. disjuncta

Binomial name
- Salvia disjuncta Fernald

= Salvia disjuncta =

Species of shrub

Salvia disjuncta, the southern Mexican sage, is a herbaceous perennial shrub native to the southern Mexican states of Oaxaca and Chiapas along with Guatemala. It is found between 7,500 and 11,000 ft elevation in warm moist mountain habitat. It was collected by botanists from Strybing Arboretum in the 1980s and became available to nurseries in the 1990s.

There are two forms of the plant: one with pale tan or green stems and mid-green leaves, and the other with raisin-colored stems and mature leaves that are purple-green. Both reach 3–4 feet (0.91–1.22 m) high and wide, with thin stems covered with fine hairs that stand out when moist with dew. The 1 in signal-red flowers grow in widely spaced whorls with deltoid shaped leaves.
