= Pile (heraldry) =

Heraldic charge in the shape of a downward-pointing wedge

Example of a standard pile, issuant from the chief, blazoned: Argent, a pile gules

In heraldry, a pile is a charge usually counted as one of the ordinaries (figures bounded by straight lines and occupying a definite portion of the shield). It consists of a wedge emerging from the upper edge of the shield and converging to a point near the base. If it touches the base, it is blazoned throughout.

== Variant positions and varying numbers ==
Though the pile issues from the top of the shield by default, it may be specified as issuing from any other part of the edge or as extending from edge to edge of the shield. Although it is not supposed to issue singly from the base, this rule is frequently ignored.

When a shield has more than one pile, and they are angled so that they touch at the base, they are described as piles in point. A few heraldry authorities from the Middle Ages such as Sir Thomas Holme and Nicholas Upton believed that whenever piles issued from the chief, they should automatically meet in point, but this view eventually fell out of favour and it has become common practice that unless otherwise specified, they should be drawn perpendicularly. However, it is still possible to see examples of the previous school of thought.

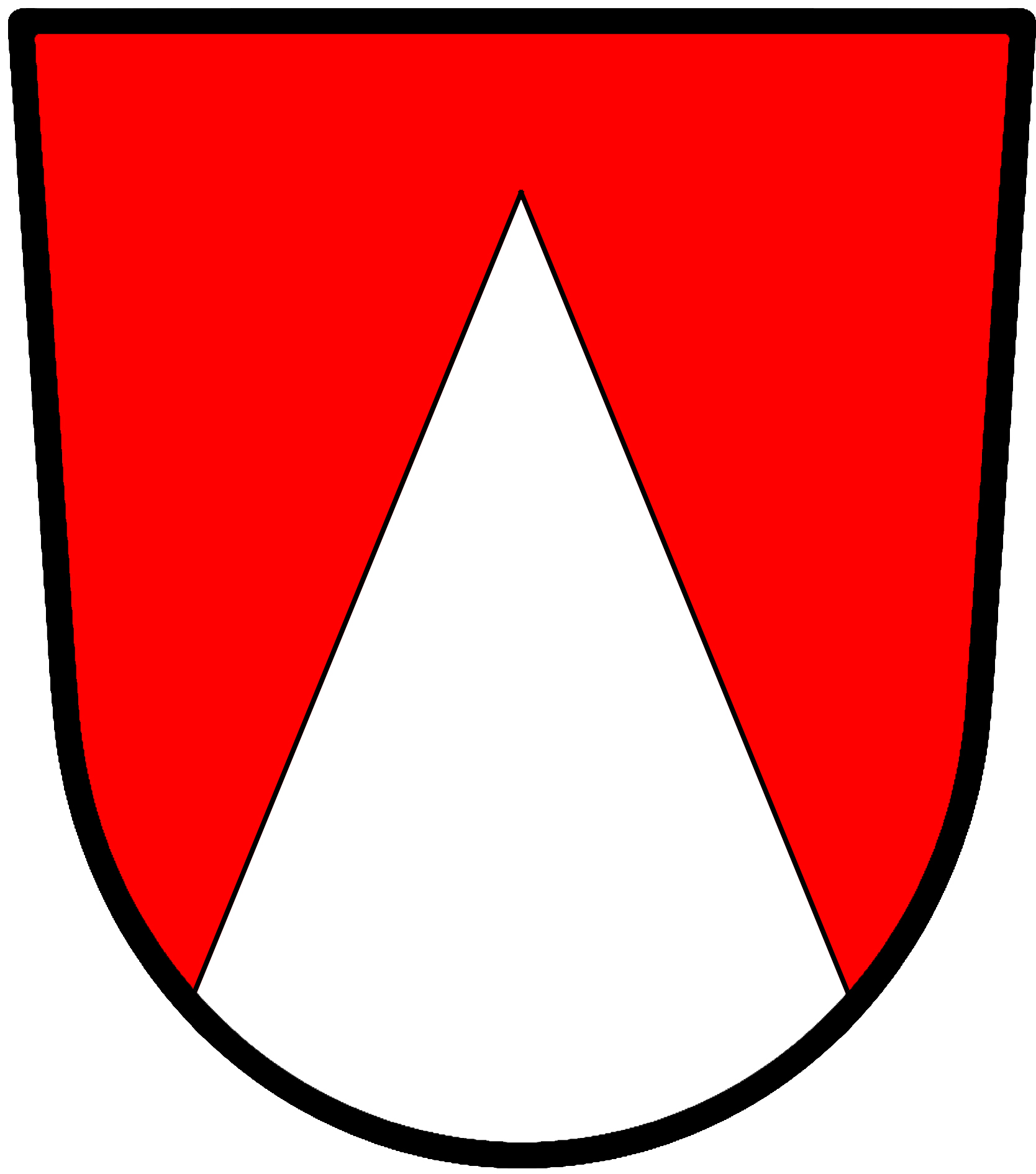
a pile reversed (or inverted or issuant from the base). If not drawn high enough, it can be confused with a division of the field per chevron. See the arms of the Asper Foundation, Canada.

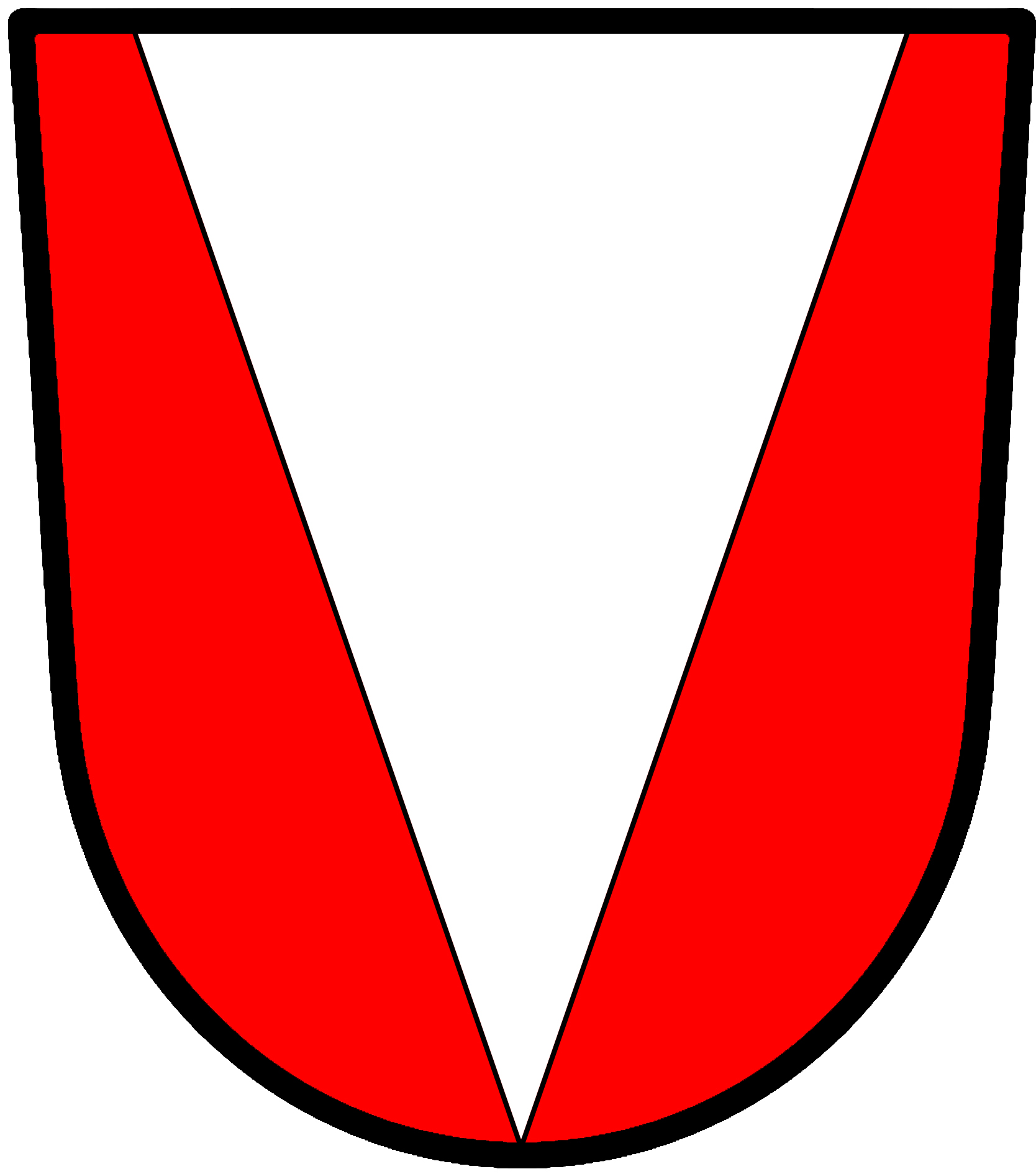
a pile throughout (or entire), reaching from one edge of the shield to the other. See arms of Tidd family, Canada.

Municipal arms of Bassecourt (Switzerland): Or, three piles issuing from dexter sable. A pile can also issue from the sinister.

Arms of Kagg family (Sweden): Azure, a pile issuing from the base in bend sinister Or.

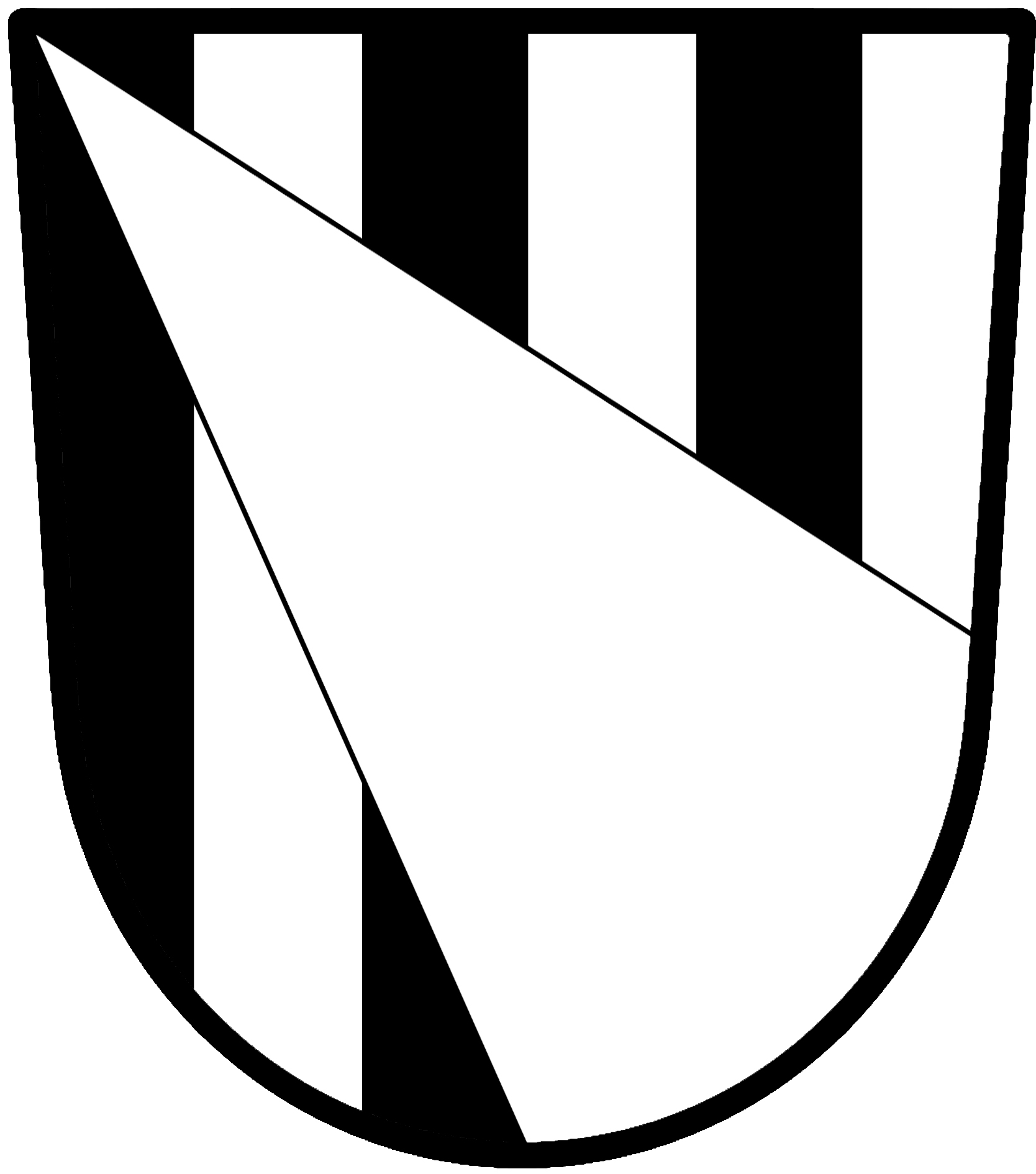
Arms of Dorosz (Canada): Paly sable and argent, a pile throughout issuant from the sinister base argent.

John of Scotland, Earl of Huntingdon: Or, three piles in point (or conjoined in base) gules. If not so specified, the piles run parallel. (In early armory, whether or not the piles converged depended on the shape of the shield or flag.)

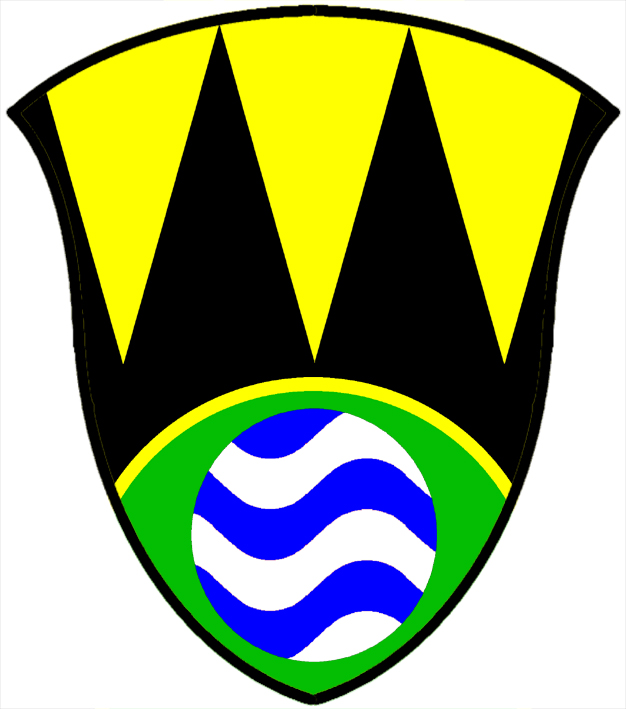
High Peak Borough Council (England): Sable; three piles or; on a base enarched vert, fimbriated or, a fountain.

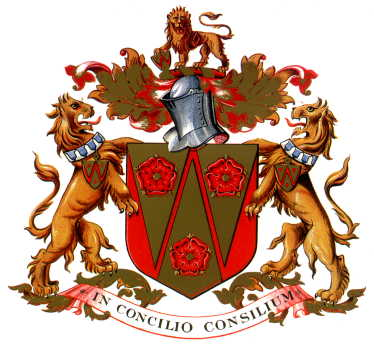
Lancashire County Council (England): Gules, three piles, two issuant from the chief and one in base, or, each charged with a rose of the field, barbed and seeded proper.

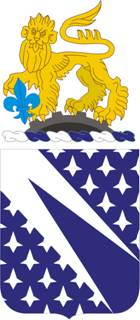
89th Cavalry Regiment, USA: Azure, semé of caltrops Argent, on a bend of the second an elongated inverted pile of the first. (The word elongated is not necessary.)

The arms of Jacques d'Étampes (1590–1668), Marshal of France, feature two piles in point issued from the base, or in chevron

== Variant forms ==
Like any ordinary, a pile may have other charges on it, may have its edges ornamented by any of the lines of variation, and may have any tincture or pattern.

Cubitt, Baron Ashcombe: Chequy gules and Or, on a pile argent a lion's head sable.

Suomenniemi district (Finland): Argent, on a pile issuant from sinister azure, a cuckoo Or.

Töysä district (Finland): Azure, a pile invected reversed, from which emerges a cross with 'arched' arms.

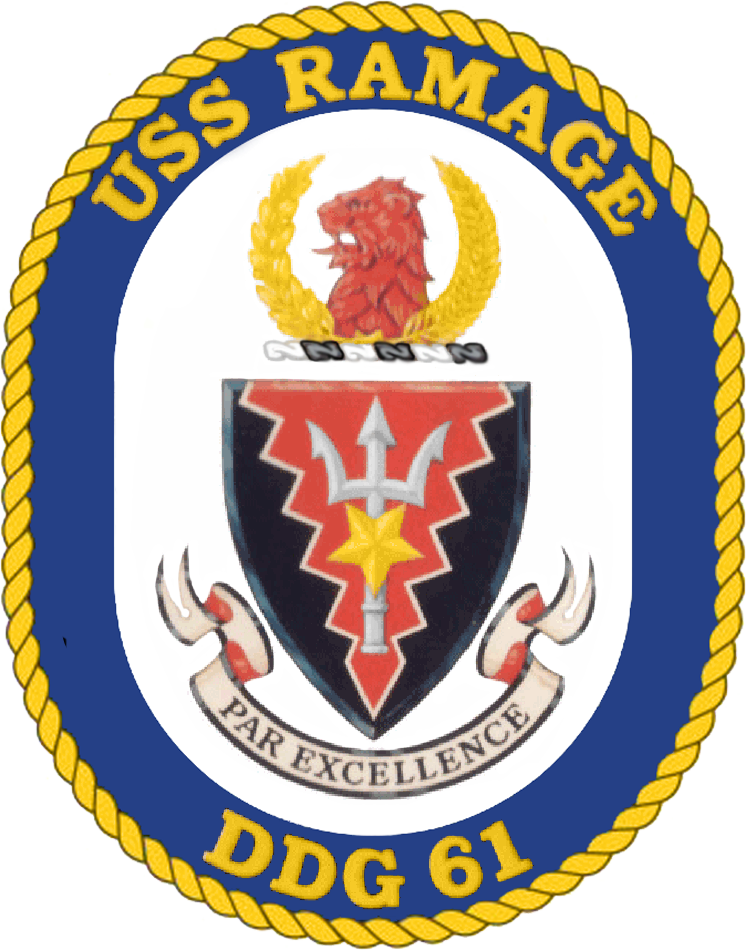
USS Ramage: Azure, on a pile indented Gules fimbriated Argent, a trident head of the like surmounted by a mullet of five points one point to base Or.

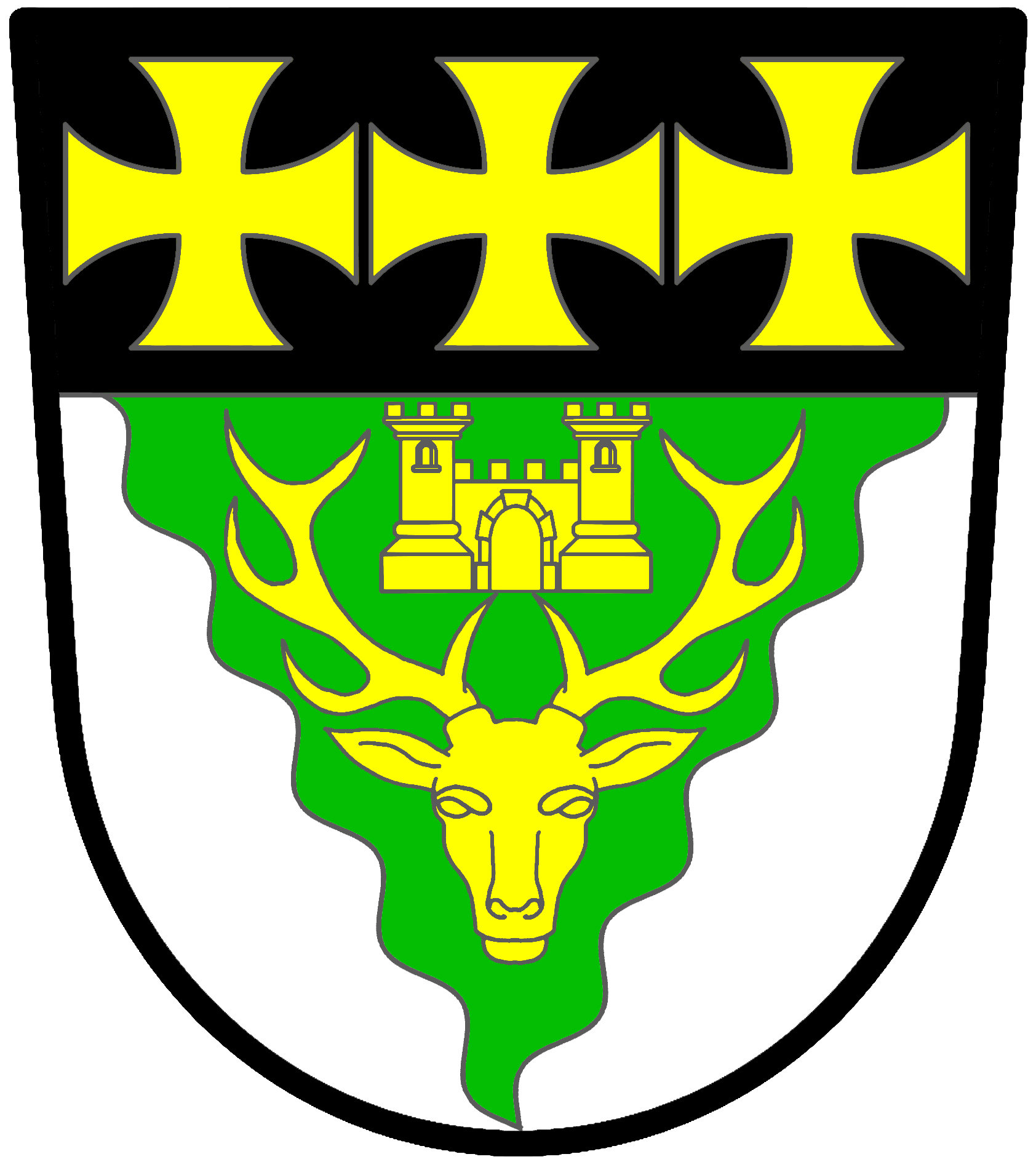
Lydney Rural District Council (abolished 1974): Argent, on a pile wavy throughout vert, a stag's head caboshed, between the attires a port between two towers, or; on a chief sable three crosses formy or.

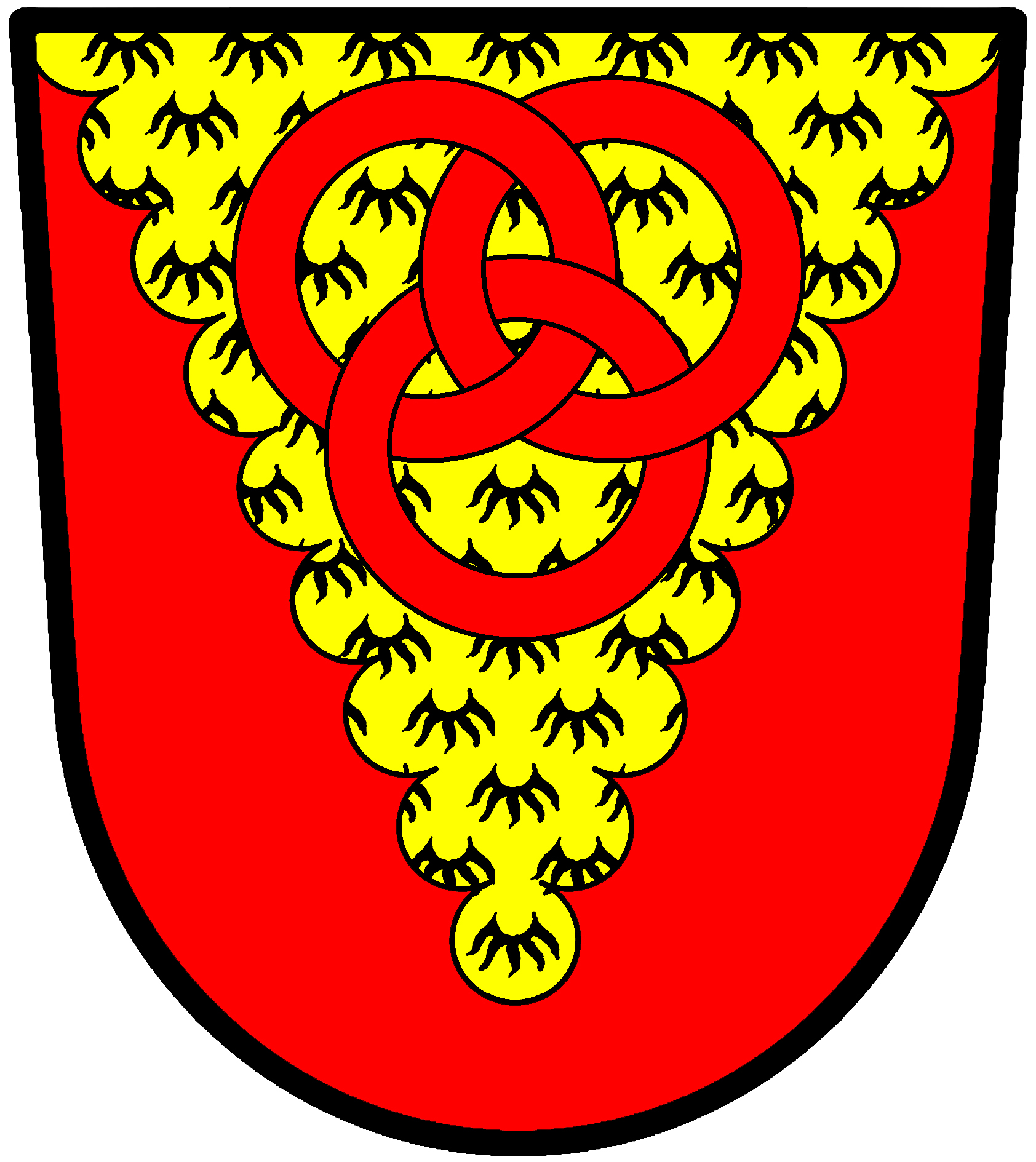
Mander (England): Gules, on a pile invected erminois three annulets interlaced two and one of the field.

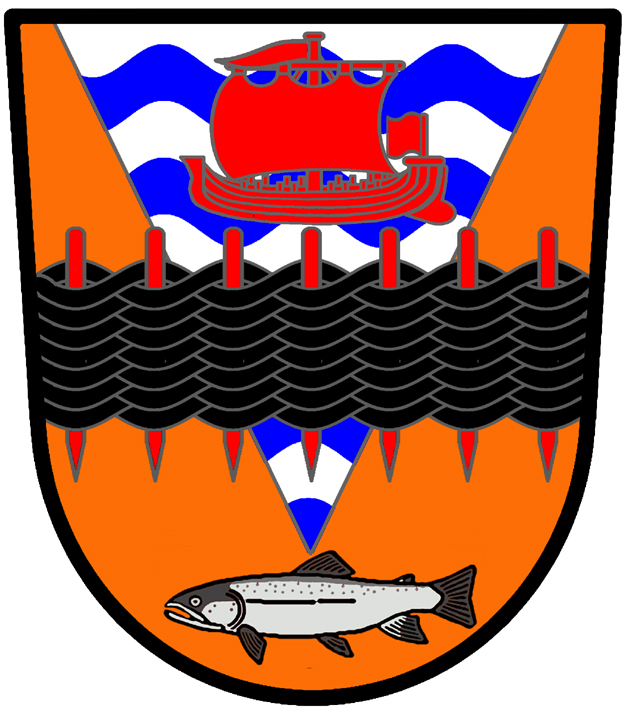
Rhyl Town Council (Wales): Tenny, a pile barruly wavy argent and azure, over all a fish weir sable, staked gules, in fess between a lymphad sail set, pennon and flags flying, gules, and in base a salmon naiant proper.

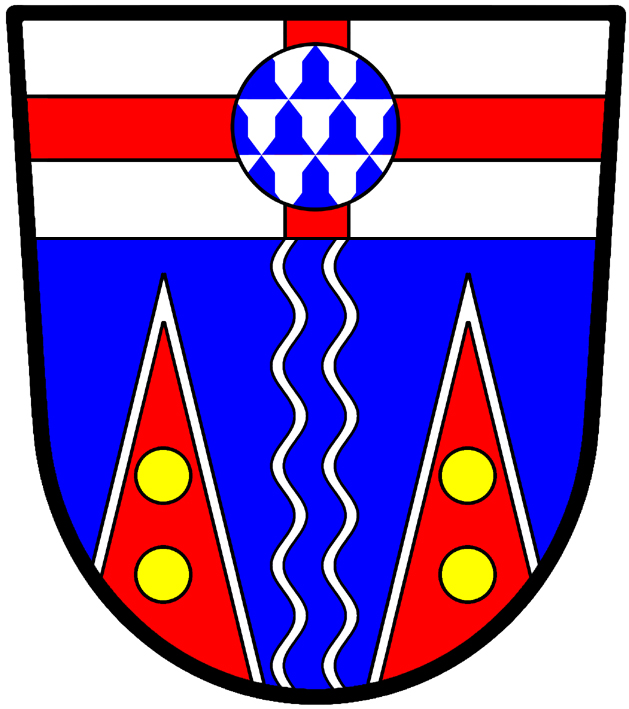
Yukon Territory (Canada): Azure, on a pallet wavy argent a like pallet azure, issuant from the base, two piles reversed gules, edged [=fimbriated] argent, each charged with two bezants in pale; on a chief argent, a cross gules, surmounted of a roundel vair.

== Rare variants ==
Occasionally piles have more than one point, appear in large numbers, have their points truncated or ornamented, have their edges ornamented, or are charged with other piles.

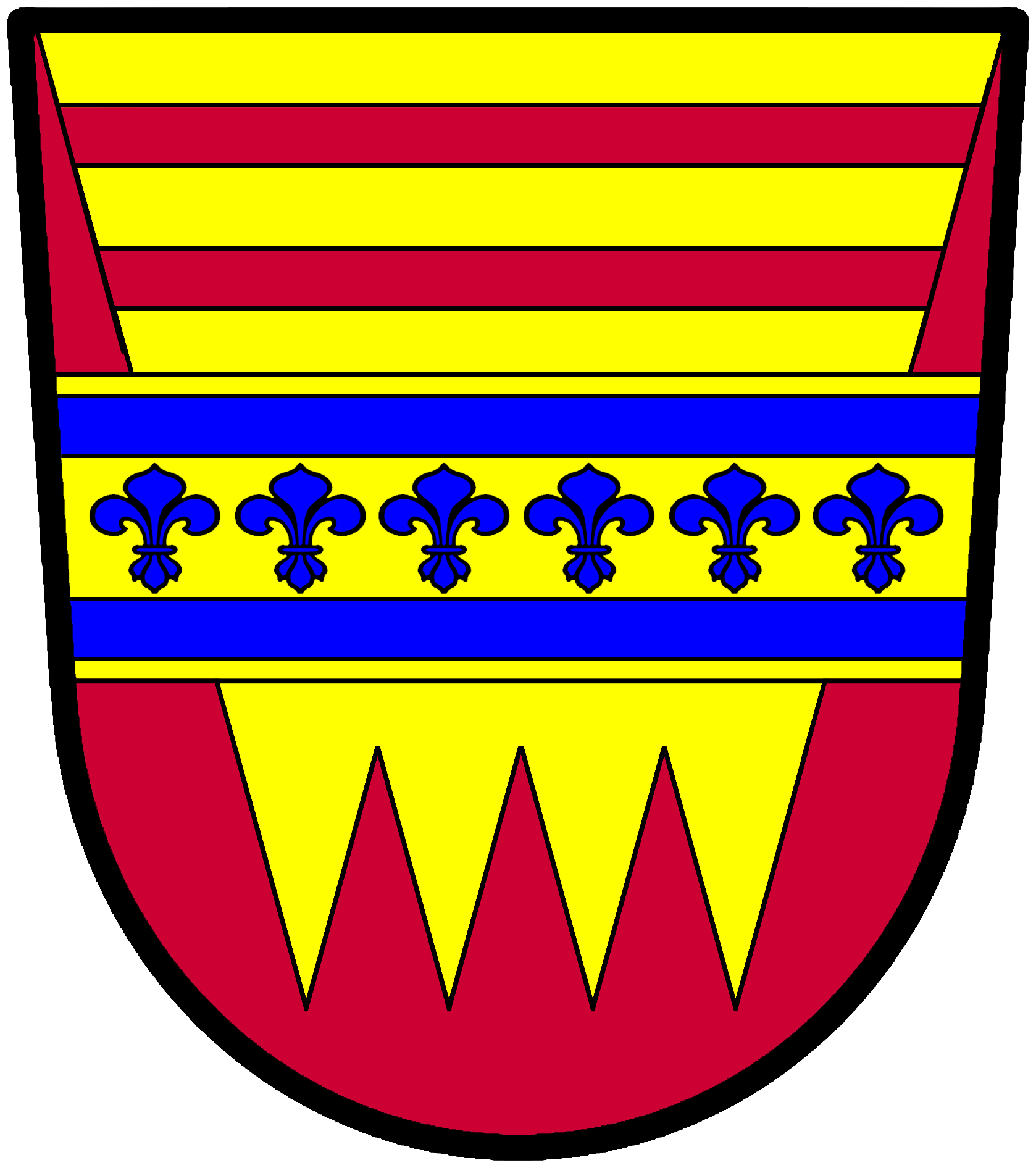
726 Maintenance Battalion, USA: Gules (Crimson), in chief on a pile of four points or, two barrulets of the first, overall on a fess of the second, six fleurs-de-lis azure between two barrulets of the same.

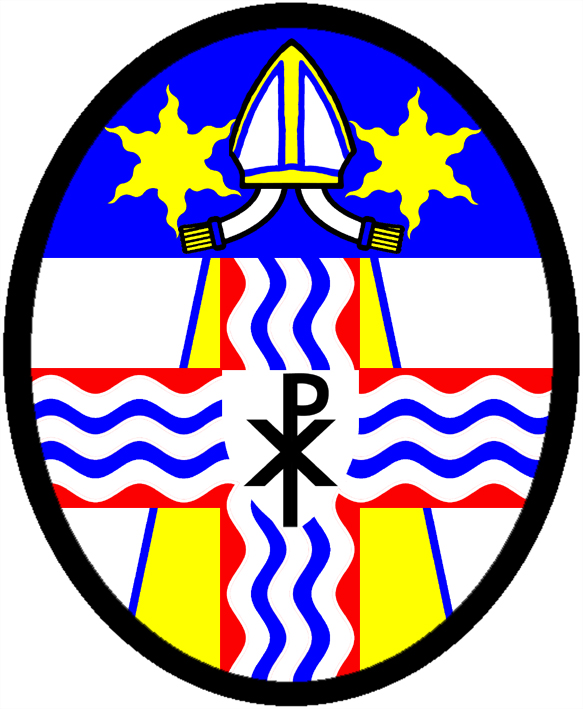
Christ Church Cathedral (Canada): Argent, a pile reversed entire [=throughout] truncated at chief or edged azure overall a cross gules surmounted by a cross wavy argent ...

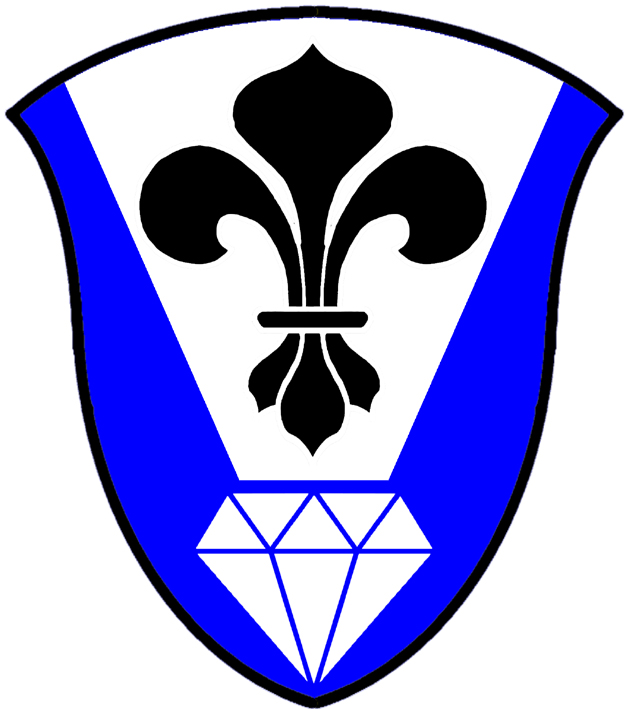
H R Stockdale Nursing College (South Africa): Azure, on a pile argent, the point couped, a fleur-de-lis sable, in base a cut diamond argent.

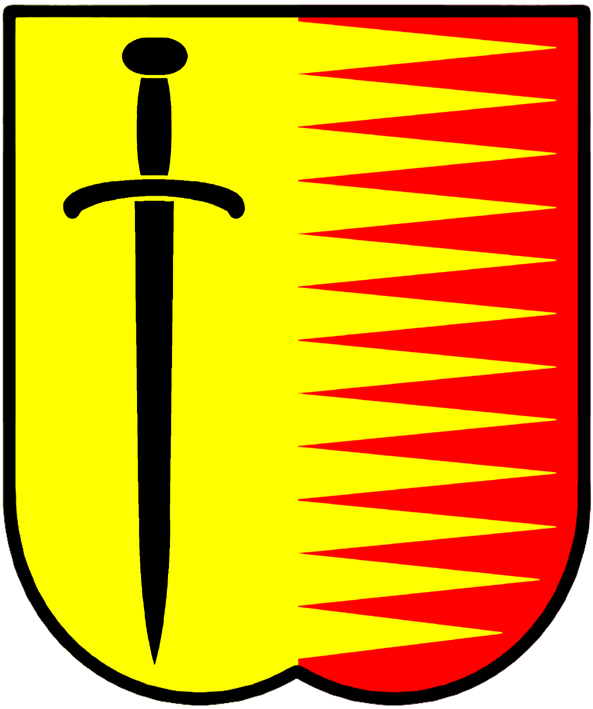
Security Officers Board, RSA: Per pale or and gules, issuant from the partition twelve piles to sinister or, dexter a sword inverted sable.

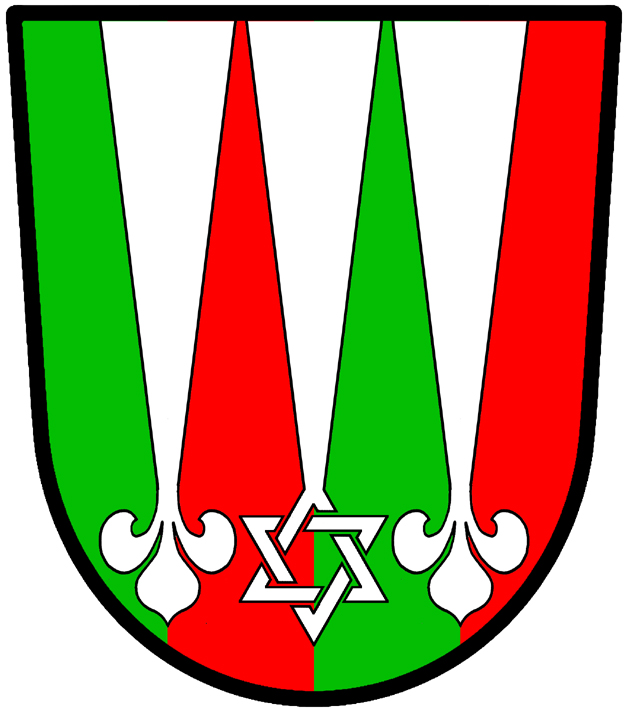
Janner (England): Paly of four vert and gules a pile terminating in a triangle interlaced with a triangle reversed between two piles each terminating in a fleur-de-lis argent.

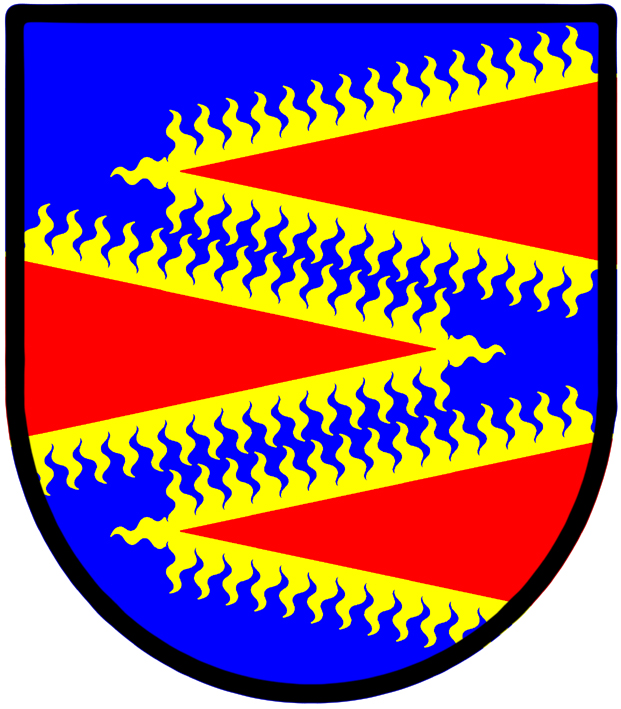
Paul (England): Azure, on each of three piles rayonny or, one issuing from the dexter and two from the sinister, a pile gules.

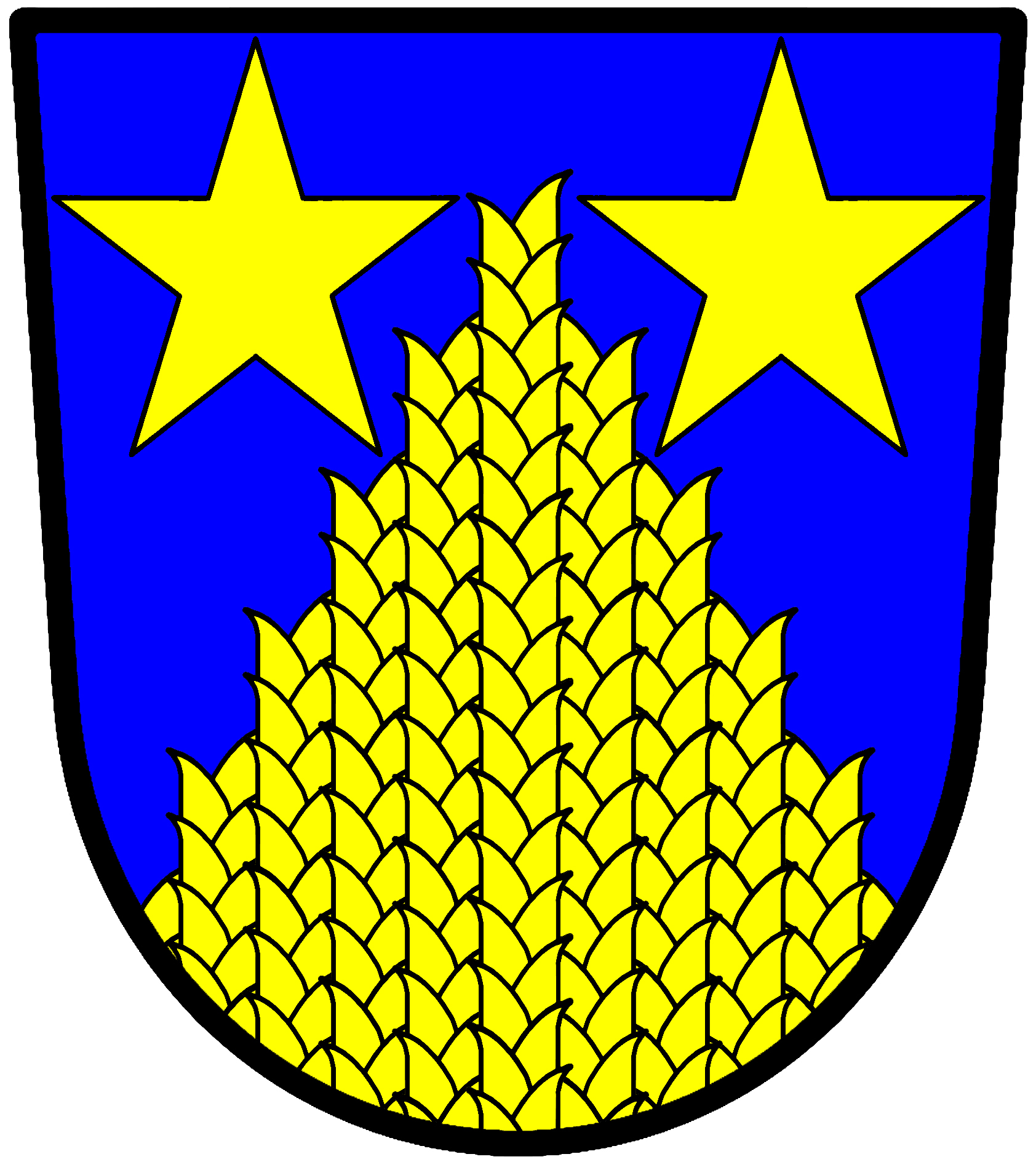
Hunley (Canada): Azure, a pile reversed of ears of wheat or issuant from base and in chief two mullets also or.

== Other things 'in pile' or 'pilewise' ==
A collection of charges in a converging arrangement may be blazoned as pilewise or in pile.

104th Infantry Regiment, USA: Per chevron enhanced argent and azure, in chief a cross gules, between six mullets pilewise a crenelated torch of the first flamant of three of the third, and in base an Indian arrowhead point to base of the first.

Arms of the Duchy of Cornwall: Sable, fifteen bezants in pile.

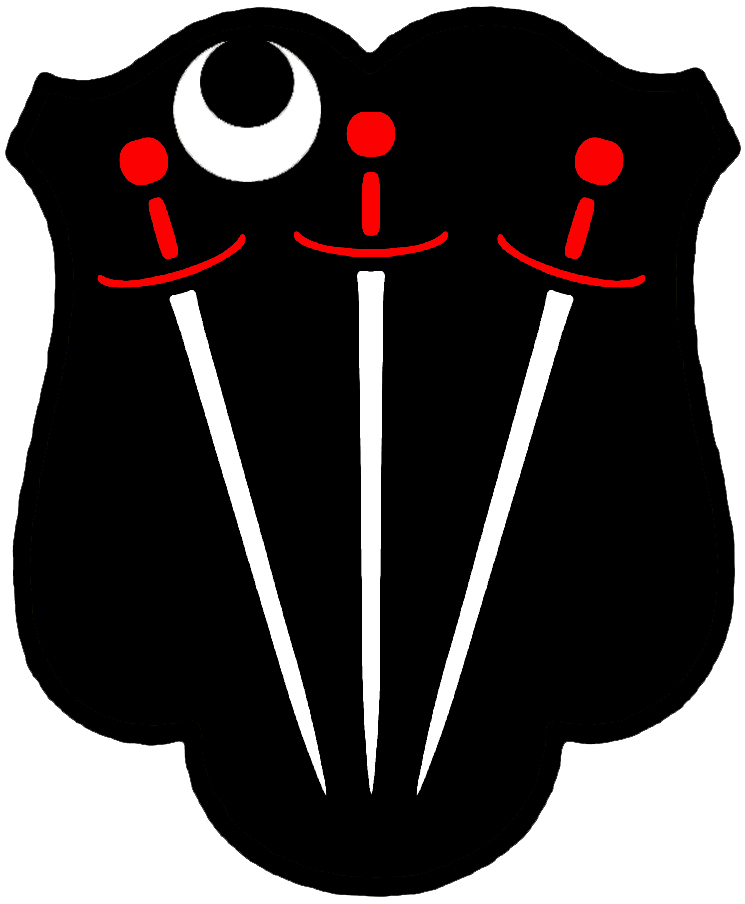
Pawlets (England): Sable, three swords in pile, points in base, argent, hilted gules, a crescent for difference.

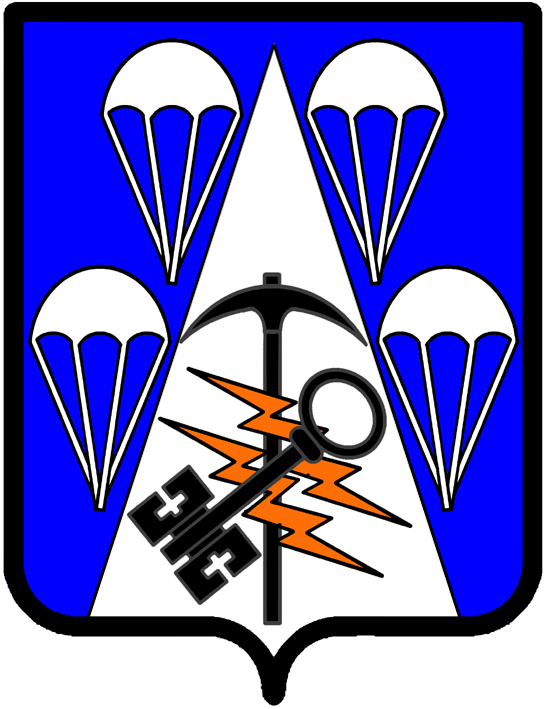
Special Troops Battalion, 4th Brigade Combat Team, USA: Azure, on a pile reversed between four parachutes deployed in pile reversed, argent, a pick axe paleways, head upwards, sable, surmounted by two lightning bolts in bend, tenny, surmounted by a double warded key in bend sinister, wards to base sable.

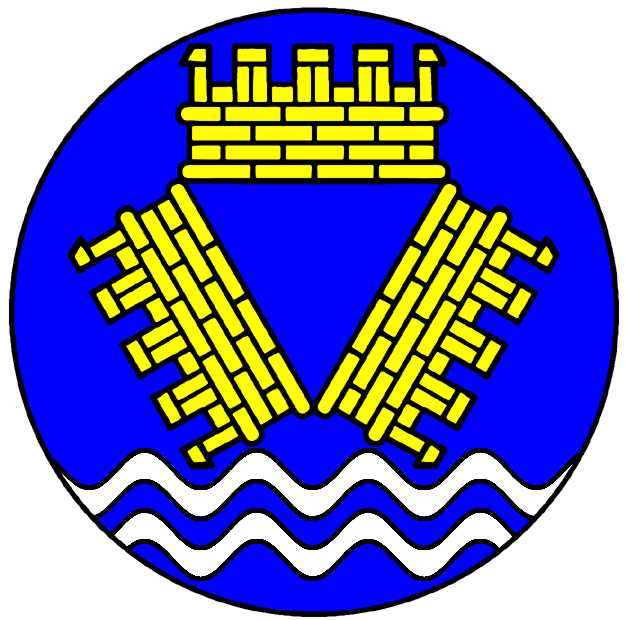
Badge of Merseyside Metropolitan Council (England): On a roundel azure three mural crowns conjoined in pile [merlons outwards] or, in base two barrulets argent.

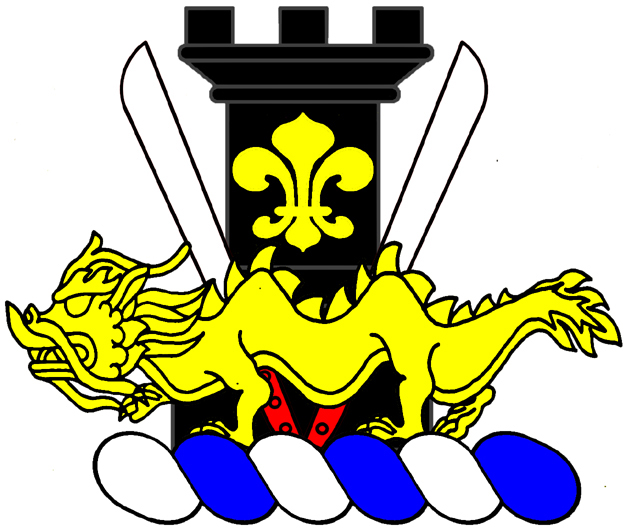
Crest of 184th Ordnance Battalion, USA: From a wreath argent and azure, a castle sable charged with a fleur-de-lis or surmounted by two machetes pilewise handle and hilt gules, blades argent, overall an oriental dragon passant or.

== Charge or division? ==
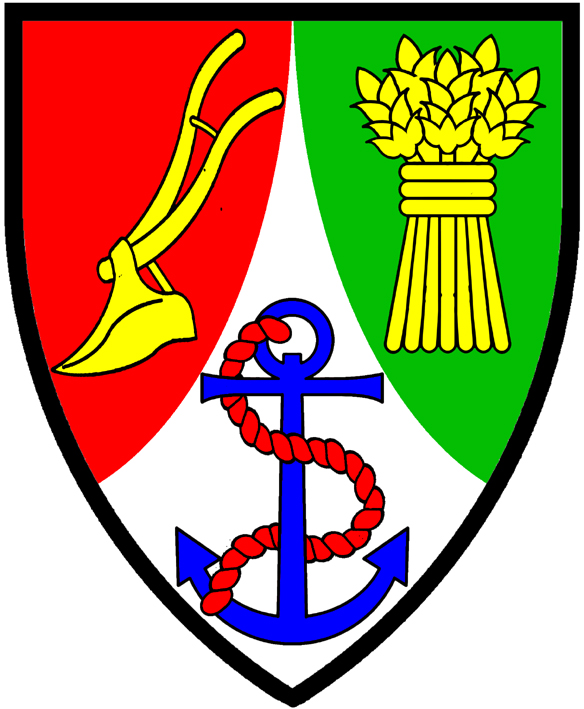
per pile or tierced per pile gules, vert and argent

The distinction between a pile and a field divided per chevron inverted, or between a pile inverted and a field per chevron, can be uncertain.

The arms shown here, for the Elsenburg College of Agriculture, was blazoned by the South African Bureau of Heraldry as Per pile embowed inverted throughout gules, vert and argent; dexter a single share plough and sinister a garb, or, in base an anchor azure, cabled gules; but it could as easily be blazoned as Per pale gules and vert; on a pile inverted embowed argent, between a plough and a garb Or, an anchor azure cabled gules.

== Piles on flags ==
=== National ===
Flag of Antigua and Barbuda

Flag of the Bahamas

Flag of Burundi (stars in pile, one and two)

Flag of the Comoros

Flag of Cuba

Flag of the Czech Republic

Flag of Djibouti

Flag of the Philippines

Flag of Timor-Leste

Flag of Equatorial Guinea

Flag of Eritrea

Flag of Guyana

Flag of Jordan

Flag of the Marshall Islands

Flag of Mozambique

Flag of Palestine

Flag of Saint Lucia

Flag of São Tomé and Príncipe

Flag of Seychelles

Flag of South Sudan

Flag of Sudan

Flag of Zimbabwe

=== Historic national ===
Former flag of the Republic of Mozambique (1975–1983)

Flag of the former South Yemen (1967–1990)

=== Subnational ===
Flag of Bahia, Brazil

Flag of the Afar Region, Ethiopia

Flag of the Benishangul-Gumuz Region, Ethiopia

Flag of the Somali Region, Ethiopia

Flag of the Tigray Region, Ethiopia

Flag of Marquesas Islands, France

Flag of Martinique, France

Flag of Sint Maarten, Netherlands

Flag of Akwa Ibom State, Nigeria

Flag of Oyo State, Nigeria

Flag of Chukotka Autonomous Okrug, Russia

Flag of Khabarovsk Krai, Russia

Flag of Zabaykalsky Krai, Russia

Flag of Galmudug State, Somalia

Flag of the Duchy of Cornwall, United Kingdom (Sable, fifteen bezants in pile)

Flag of American Samoa, USA

Flag of Puerto Rico, USA

Flag of the State of Ohio, USA

Flag of Mérida State, Venezuela

=== Municipal ===
Flag of El Alto, Bolivia

Flag of Senaki Municipality, Georgia

Granted flag of Cornwall, Ontario, Canada (Fifteen pellets in pile)

Flag of Taulabé, Honduras

Flag of Majuro, Marshall Islands

Flag of Kociewie, Pomerania, Poland

Flag of Vorkuta, Komi Republic, Russia

Flag of El Hierro, Canary Islands, Spain

Village flag of Nenthead, Cumbria, England, United Kingdom

Flag of Minneapolis, Minnesota, USA

Flag of Moca, Puerto Rico, USA

Flag of Río Grande, Puerto Rico, USA

Flag of Rincón, Puerto Rico, USA

Flag of Caracas, Venezuela
