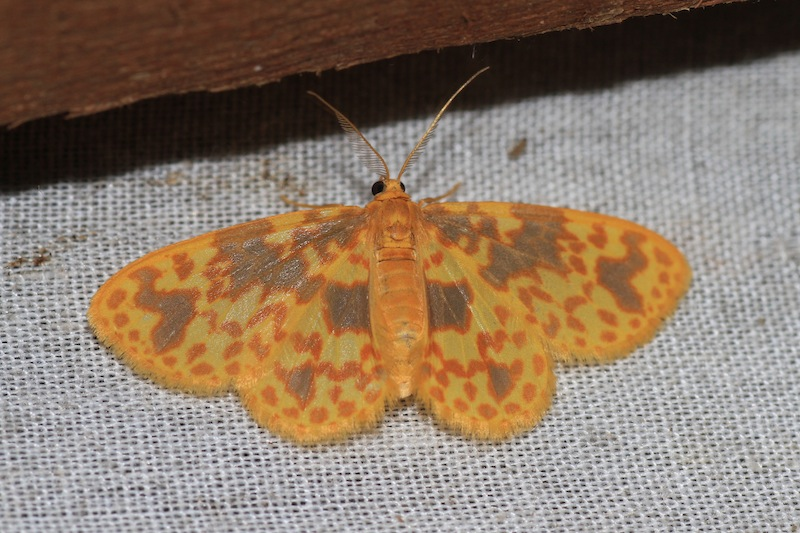

Scientific classification
- Kingdom: Animalia
- Phylum: Arthropoda
- Class: Insecta
- Order: Lepidoptera
- Family: Geometridae
- Genus: Microplutodes
- Species: M. hilaropa

Binomial name
- Microplutodes hilaropa (Meyrick comb. n., 1897)

Synonyms
- Plutodes hilaropa Meyrick, 1897

= Microplutodes hilaropa =

Species of moth

Microplutodes hilaropa is a species of moth of the family Geometridae first described by Edward Meyrick in 1897. It is found on Borneo and Sumatra.
