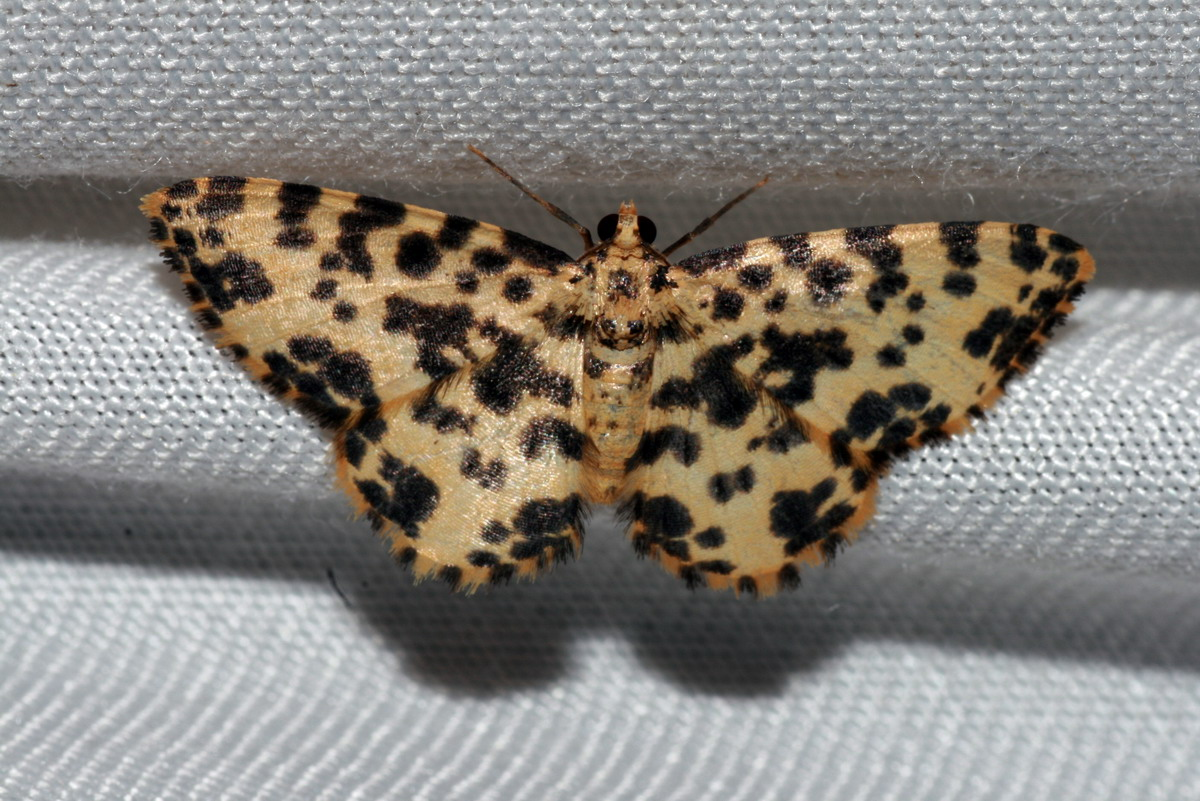

Scientific classification
- Kingdom: Animalia
- Phylum: Arthropoda
- Clade: Pancrustacea
- Class: Insecta
- Order: Lepidoptera
- Family: Geometridae
- Genus: Monocerotesa
- Species: M. proximesta

Binomial name
- Monocerotesa proximesta Holloway, 1993

= Monocerotesa proximesta =

Species of moth

Monocerotesa proximesta is a moth of the family Geometridae first described by Jeremy Daniel Holloway in 1993. It is found in Borneo.

The wingspan is 9–10 mm.
