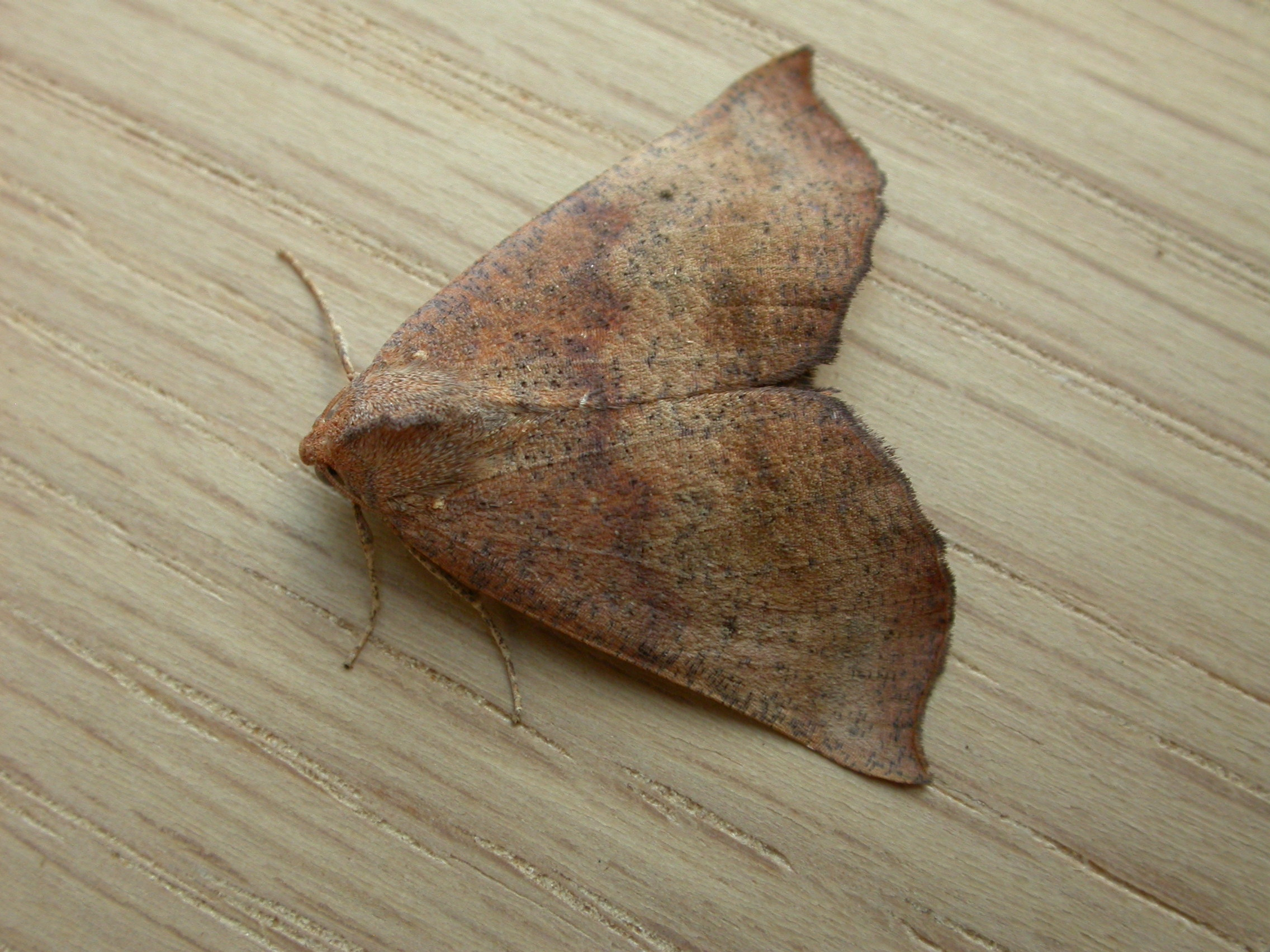

Scientific classification
- Kingdom: Animalia
- Phylum: Arthropoda
- Class: Insecta
- Order: Lepidoptera
- Family: Geometridae
- Genus: Mnesampela
- Species: M. privata

Binomial name
- Mnesampela privata Guenée, 1858

Synonyms
- Azelina inordinata

= Mnesampela privata =

Species of moth

Mnesampela privata, the autumn gum moth, is a moth of the family Geometridae. The species was first described by Achille Guenée in 1858. It is found in most of Australia.

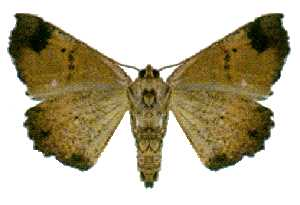
Illustration

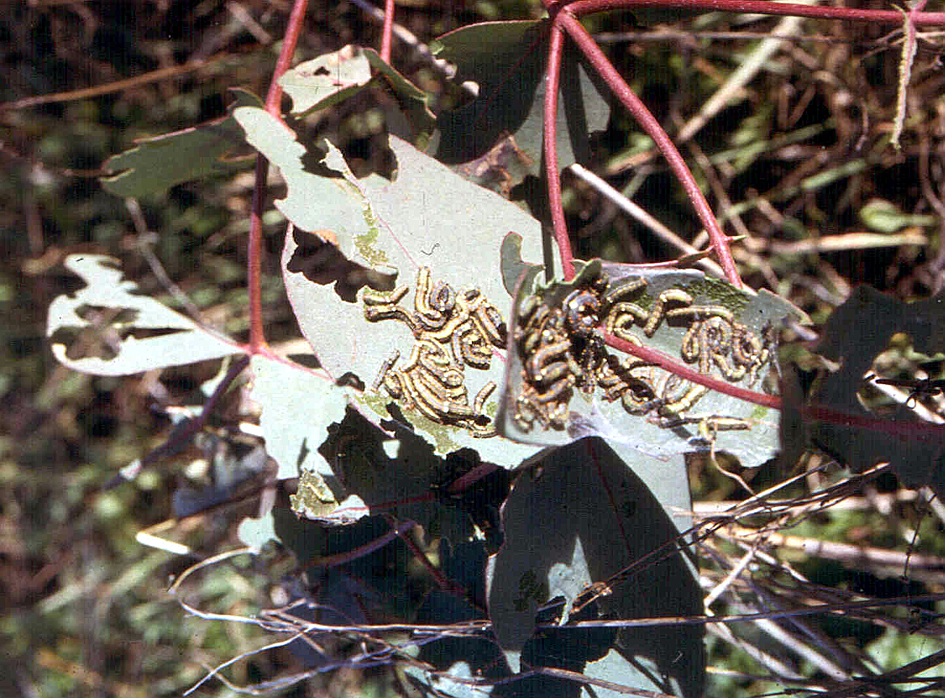
Autumn gum moth caterpillars

The wingspan is about 40 mm.

The larvae feed on Eucalyptus species and is considered a pest for Eucalyptus plantations.
