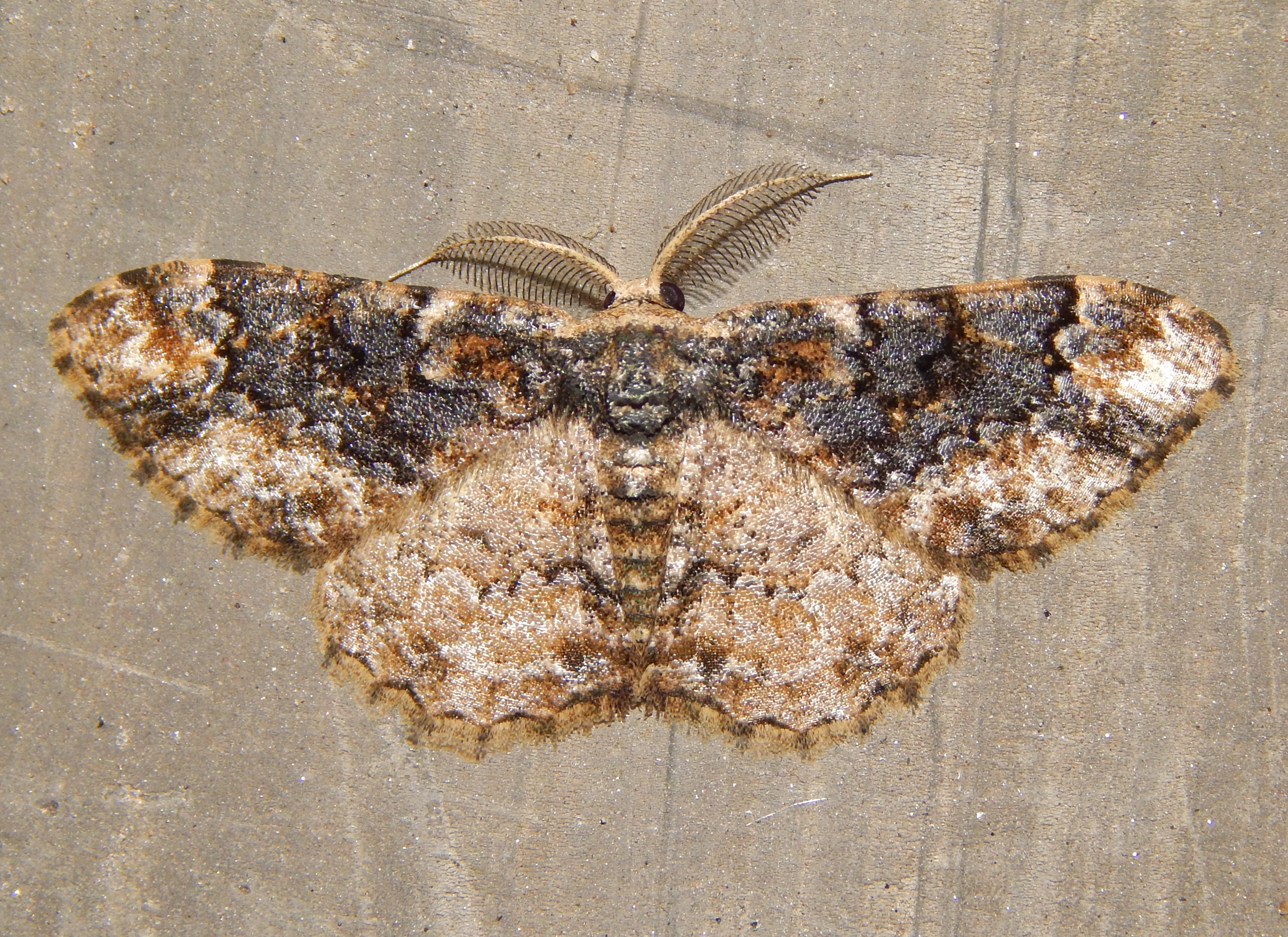

Scientific classification
- Kingdom: Animalia
- Phylum: Arthropoda
- Clade: Pancrustacea
- Class: Insecta
- Order: Lepidoptera
- Family: Geometridae
- Genus: Microcalicha
- Species: M. minima

Binomial name
- Microcalicha minima Warren, 1896

= Microcalicha minima =

Species of moth

Microcalicha minima is a moth of the family Geometridae. It was first described by the English entomologist William Warren in 1896.

== Description ==
It is a small dark brown moth, similar in appearance to Lophobates mesotoechia but it has pale fawn and brown patches subapically at the costa of the forewing between the postmedial and submarginal, and tornus on the hindwing.

== Distribution ==
It occurs in Borneo, Sumatra, and the north-eastern Himalayas.
