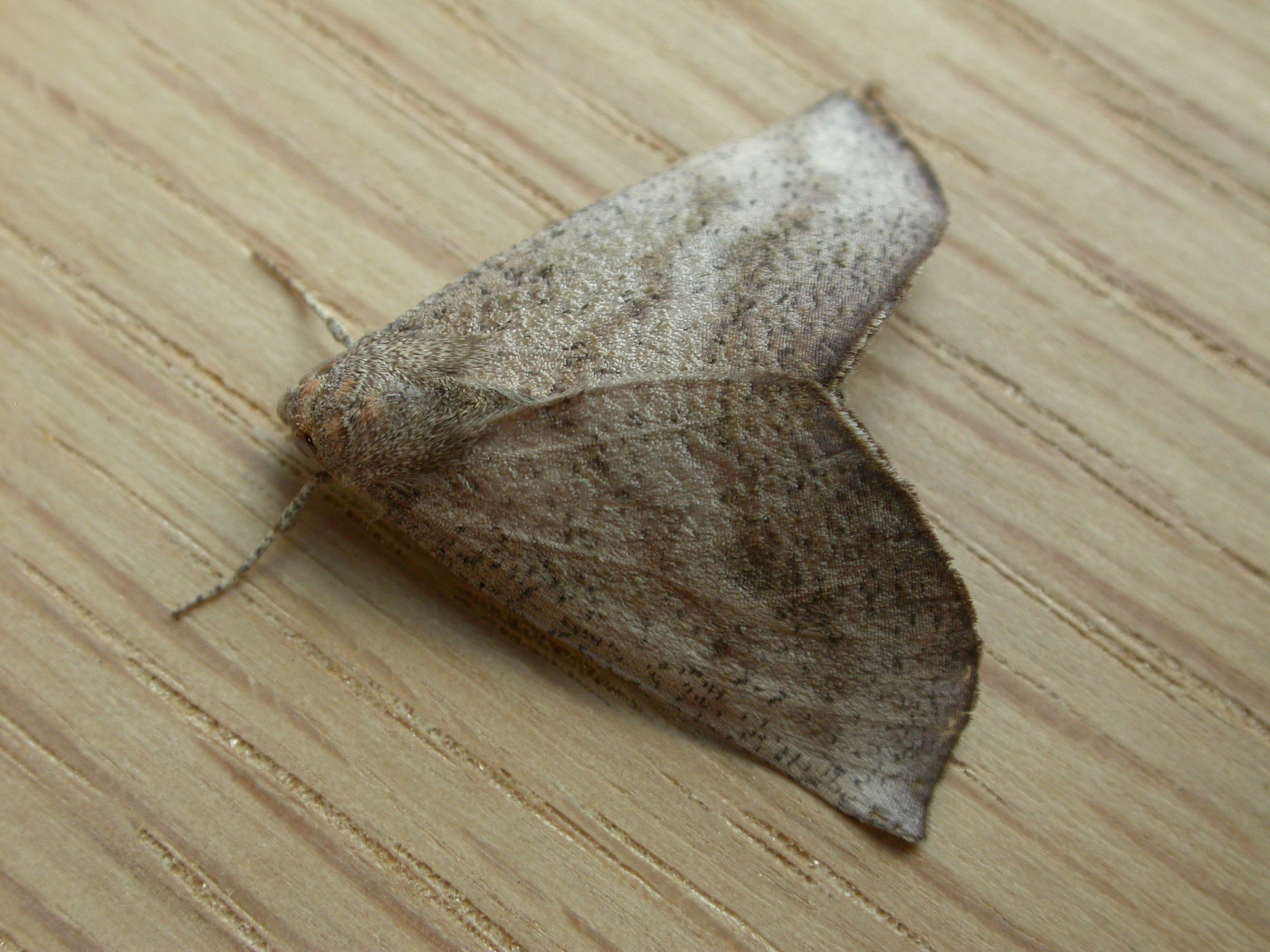

Scientific classification
- Domain: Eukaryota
- Kingdom: Animalia
- Phylum: Arthropoda
- Class: Insecta
- Order: Lepidoptera
- Family: Geometridae
- Genus: Mnesampela
- Species: M. lenaea

Binomial name
- Mnesampela lenaea Meyrick, 1892

= Mnesampela lenaea =

Species of moth

Mnesampela lenaea, the rippled gum moth, is a moth of the family Geometridae first described by Edward Meyrick in 1892. It is found in Australia.
