= Matang (disambiguation) =

Matang is a mukim in Perak, Malaysia.

Matang may also refer to

== China ==
- Matang, Suining (Chinese: 麻塘苗族瑶族乡), a Dong and Miao ethnic township of Suining County, Hunan province

== India ==
- Matang community, an Indian caste mainly residing in the state of Maharashtra

== Malaysia ==
- Matang Highway, an expressway located in the Malaysian state of Sarawak
- Matang (federal constituency), a federal constituency in Perak, Malaysia

== Philippines ==
- Matang Tubig, a tourist attraction in Calamba, Laguna, Philippines

== See also ==
- Matanga (disambiguation)
- Matangi (disambiguation)
