= Mimoclystia griveaudi =

Scientific classification
- Domain: Eukaryota
- Kingdom: Animalia
- Phylum: Arthropoda
- Class: Insecta
- Order: Lepidoptera
- Family: Geometridae
- Genus: Mimoclystia
- Species: M. griveaudi

Binomial name
- Mimoclystia griveaudi Herbulot, 1970

Species of moth

Mimoclystia griveaudi is a species of moth of the family Geometridae first described by Claude Herbulot in 1970. It is found in northern Madagascar.

It looks similar to Mimoclystia acme, described by Prout in 1922, but it is bigger with larger wings and the coloration is more rose. The length of its forewings is 13.5 mm.
