= Matangi (disambiguation) =

Matangi is a Hindu goddess.

Matangi can also refer to:

- Haimona Pita Matangi (c. 1780–1839), Māori chief
- Mang (caste), Indian caste, mainly in Maharashtra
- Matangi (album), a 2013 album by M.I.A.
- New Zealand FP “Matangi” class electric multiple unit, a class of rail units
- Matangi Tonga, a newspaper
- Matangi Tonga (American football) (born 1988), American football player
- Matangi, Tokelau, an islet
- Matangi, New Zealand, a settlement in the Hamilton Urban Area
- Matagi Island, Fiji
- M.I.A. (rapper), born Mathangi Arulpragasam

== See also ==
- Matanga (disambiguation)
- Matang (disambiguation)
