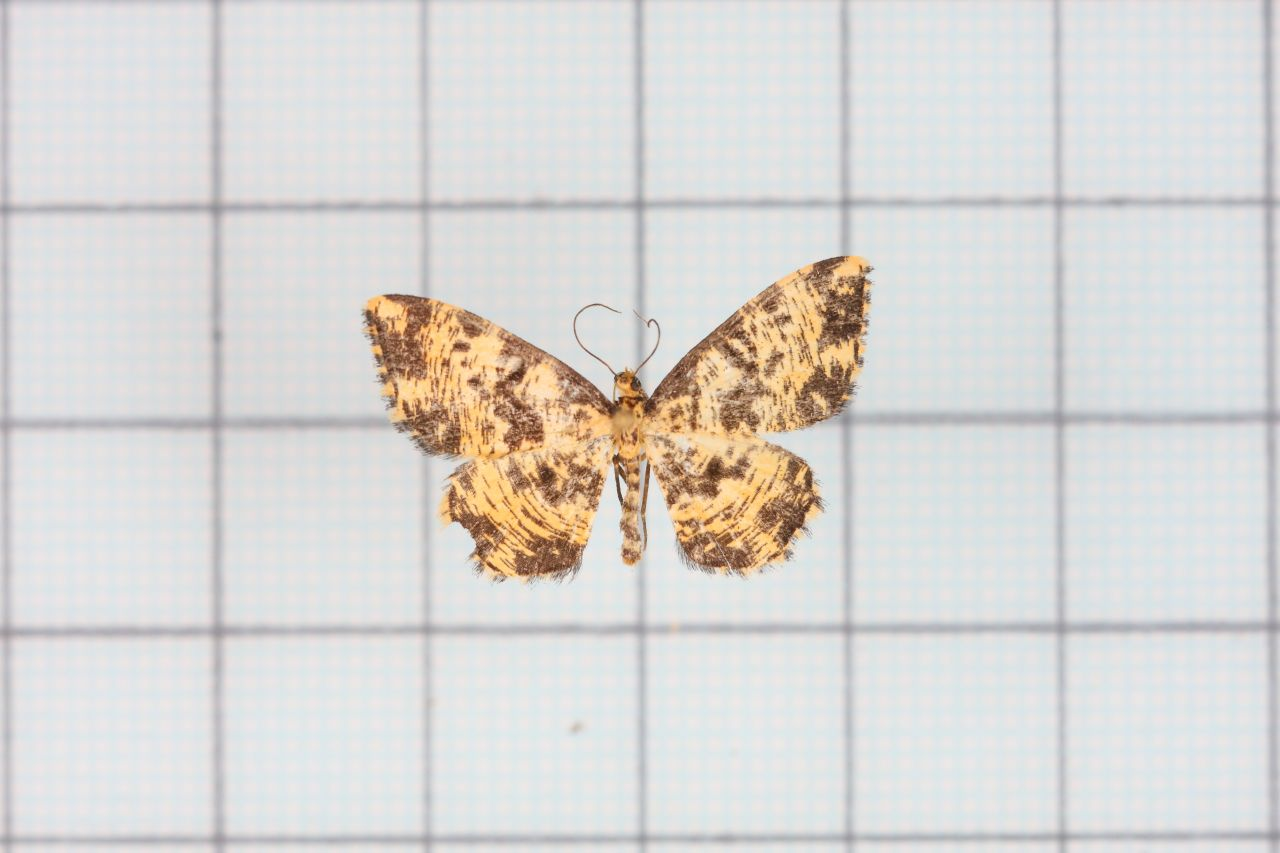

Scientific classification
- Domain: Eukaryota
- Kingdom: Animalia
- Phylum: Arthropoda
- Class: Insecta
- Order: Lepidoptera
- Family: Geometridae
- Genus: Monocerotesa
- Species: M. virgata

Binomial name
- Monocerotesa virgata (Wileman, 1912)

Synonyms
- Alcis virgata Wileman, 1912

= Monocerotesa virgata =

Species of moth

Monocerotesa virgata is a moth in the family Geometridae first described by Wileman in 1912. It can be found in Taiwan.

The wingspan is 20–24 mm.
