= Southern Mexico =

Coordinates: 17°N 96°W

Southern Mexico Sur de México
- Region
- States part of Southern Mexico South-3 South-6 Yucatan Peninsula
- Country: Mexico
- State: Chiapas, Guerrero, Oaxaca (sometimes Campeche, Michoacán, Puebla, Quintana Roo, Tabasco, Veracruz, Yucatán)
- Largest city: Acapulco (restrictive definition); Merida (expansive definition)

Population (2020)
  - Total: 13,216,661
- South-3

Southern Mexico (Spanish: el Sur de México) is a region of Mexico. It most often comprises at least three states—Chiapas, Guerrero, and Oaxaca—collectively termed South-3. Other states are sometimes included, such as those on the Yucatán Peninsula or Michoacán, Puebla, Tabasco, and Veracruz. Southern Mexico is among the poorest regions of the nation, with high rates of poverty and low development.

== Geography ==
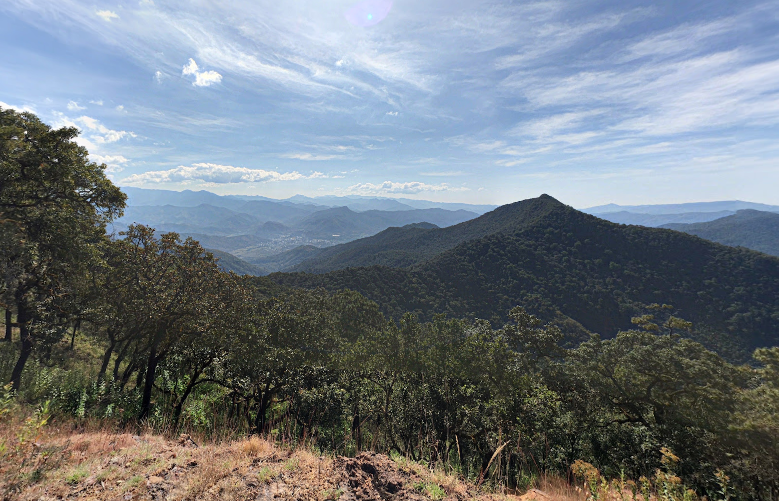
Sierra Madre del Sur in Michoacán

The region has a rugged topography, being split by several mountain ranges. The southern end of the Sierra Madre del Sur is found in Oaxaca. A large portion of Southern Mexico's population, around 40–50% as of 2019, lives in communities of less than 2,500.

The region lies near the boundary of the North American plate and Cocos plate. Earthquakes on the moment magnitude scale above 7 occur every 1–2 years.

=== Climate ===
Large portions of Southern Mexico lies in tropical savanna climate, with a warm desert climate in Oaxaca and temperate climate zones in the northern parts of the region.

== History ==
=== Indigenous ===
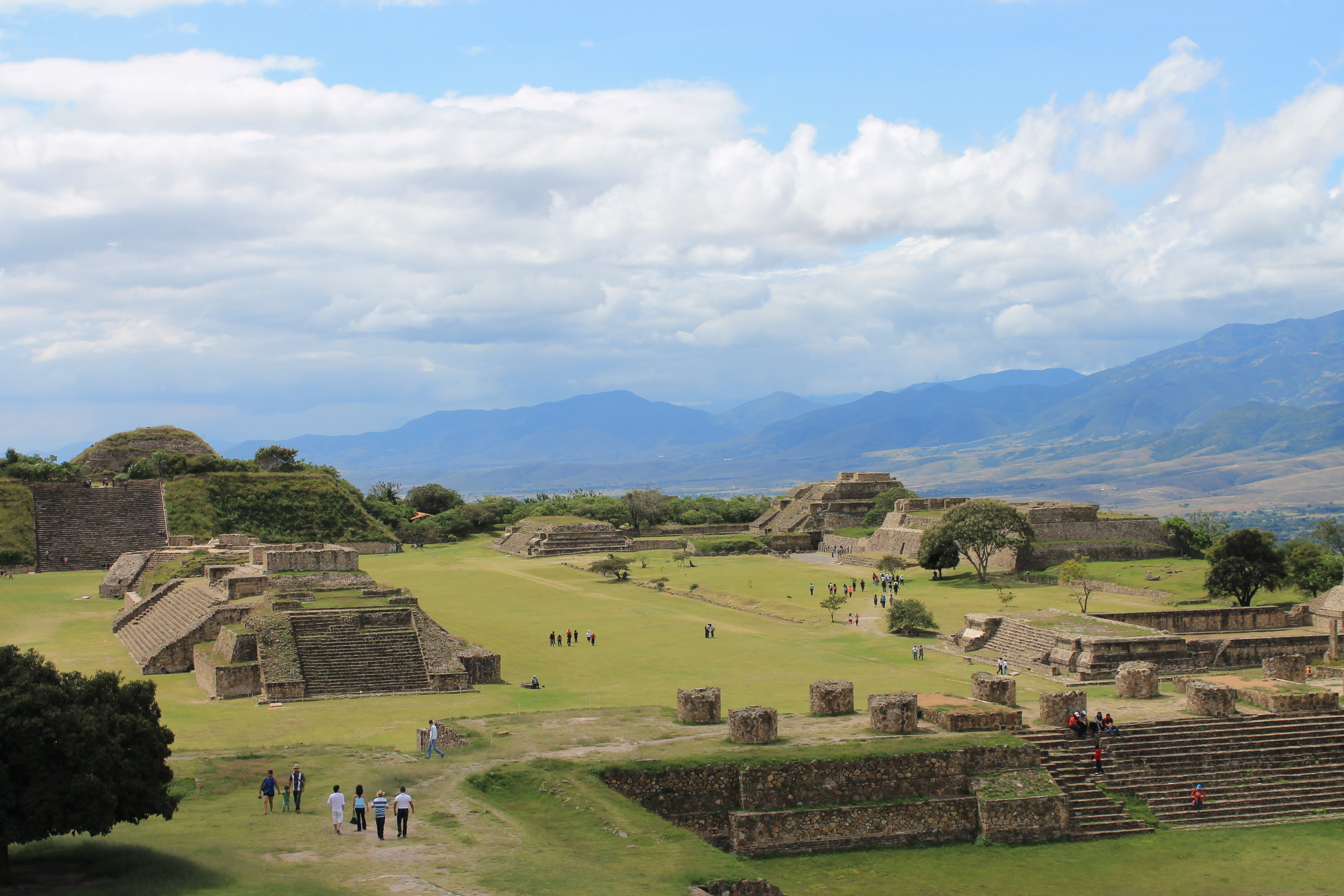
Monte Albán in Oaxaca constructed by indigenous peoples.

There were many indigenous cultures throughout Southern Mexico before Spanish colonization. The Olmec civilization was found along the Isthmus of Tehuantepec, including Veracruz and Tabasco, between 500–1200 BCE, building sites such as San Lorenzo Tenochtitlán and La Venta while farming crops like maize. The Zapotec civilization was centered in Oaxaca practicing slash-and-burn agriculture, weaving, and ceramic art. The oldest dynasty known of the Zapotecs was established in the 1300s based near Oaxaca City with control into the Isthmus of Tehuantepec. The Mixtecs superseded the Zapotecs, building cities and creating a hieroglyphic system. Many cultural practices of the Mixtecs would influence those in Central Mexico. The Aztec Empire would also expand into the south under Moctezuma I and Axayacatl. The Maya also existed in the Yucatán Peninsula for thousands of years prior to the arrival of the Spanish.

=== Colonial ===
In 1519, Veracruz was settled as the first European settlement on the mainland of the Americas. Acapulco would later be one of the few ports built in the early colonial period, facilitating trade in the Pacific.

By 1620, 90,000 square miles (230,000 km^{2}) of land in Southern Mexico between the Isthmus of Tehuantec and the Chichimeca's land became dedicated to cattle-based haciendas.

=== Postcolonial ===
Chiapas gained statehood in 1824.

Veracruz would be the site of the landing of the Americans during the Mexican–American War and Maximilian von Habsburg's entrance to Mexico.

The Pan-American Highway opened in the region in the 1950s, increasing interconnectivity.

In 1994, the Zapatista uprising began in Chiapas after the formation of the Zapatista Army of National Liberation in the 1980s. Fighting led to the creation of Municipios Autónomos y Rebeldes Zapatistas (MAREZ).

Andrés Manuel López Obrador started the development of the Tren Maya and a refinery in Tabasco. Both lie on the outskirts of the south and have been met with environmental concerns.

The MAREZ were dissolved in 2023.

In 2025, due to political instability in the region, the tourism and construction industries of Southern Mexico fell.

== Economy ==
Map of Mexican states indicating Human Development Index (2004) 0.80 and higher 0.750–0.799 0.70–0.749

Southern Mexico is the least socioeconomically developed region of Mexico. The Human Development Index score of South-3 was 0.676 in 2019 compared to 0.788 for the nation. South-6, a grouping of Chiapas, Guerrero, Michoacán, Oaxaca, Puebla, and Veracruz, which includes 20% of Mexico's population, has 40% of Mexico's poverty and 60% of Mexicans in extreme poverty. As of 2025, the states of South-3 all have extreme poverty rates in excess of 16% with Chiapas having 27%, the highest in the nation. Change in poverty has also proved to be slower than in other regions of Mexico, with some states in the north reducing poverty by around 40% while southern states only reduced poverty by around 15% at most between 2019 and 2023. The south is far from the Mexico–United States border, where many resources flow into Mexico.

As of 2019, none of the largest 100 companies of Mexico are based in the region. Due to the fact that most people in Southern Mexico live in small communities, the cost of exporting goods is higher for the region.

Economic prosperity on the Yucatán Peninsula, partially influenced by Pemex, usually leads to the region's exclusion from Southern Mexico.

== Culture ==
There is a larger indigenous population in the south than most of the rest of Mexico.

There is considerable diversity in the languages within the region. Within South-3, there are dozens of language families with 20% of the region's indigenous not speaking Spanish. On the Yucatán Peninsula, Yucatec Maya is generally dominant among the indigenous languages. According to the London School of Economics and Political Science, this diversity has inhibited unity within movements among the poor.

== Health ==
The poor of the region are less likely to have access to painkillers than other regions of Mexico.

Similar to areas of Central America, Southern Mexico has heightened rates of chronic kidney disease of unknown etiology affecting agricultural workers, particularly those working with sugarcane.

== Politics ==
No president of Mexico has come from South-3 since Porfirio Díaz, though some presidents have came from expanded definitions of the south.

According to the London School of Economics and Political Science, during the 21st century, Southern Mexico has had a disproportionate amount of "bad" governors. According to Anne-Marie Smith, South-3 has the most violations of rights within Mexico.
