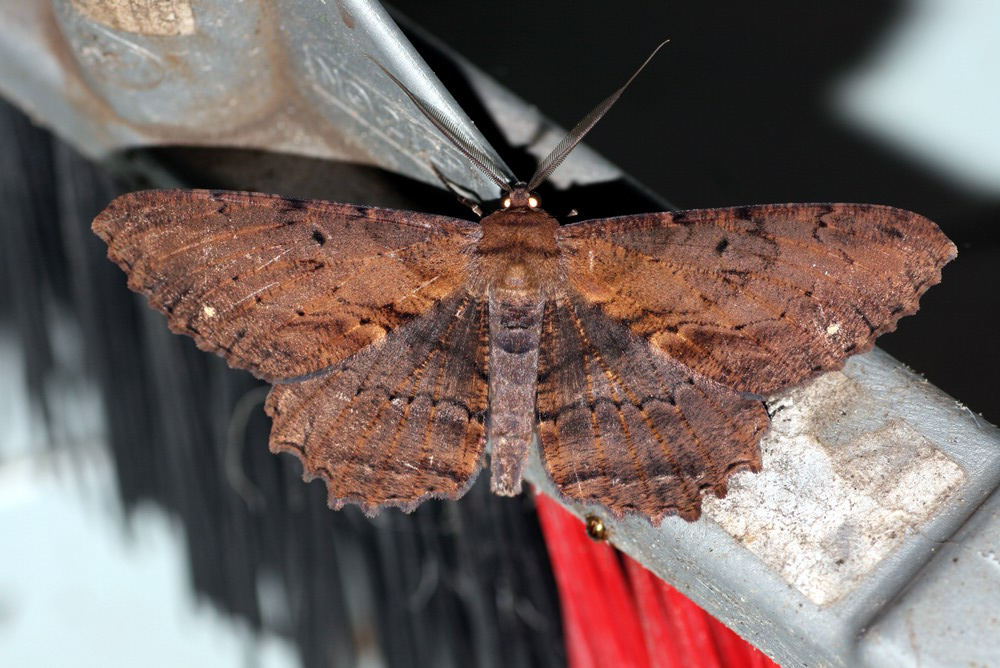

Scientific classification
- Kingdom: Animalia
- Phylum: Arthropoda
- Class: Insecta
- Order: Lepidoptera
- Family: Geometridae
- Genus: Medasina; Moore, [1887]

= Medasina =

Genus of moths

Medasina is a genus of moths in the family Geometridae. The Global Lepidoptera Names Index lists it as a junior subjective synonym of Chorodna. Species are distributed throughout India, Sri Lanka and Myanmar.

== Description ==
Palpi upturned and fringed with hair. Antennae of male bipectinate (comb like on both sides) to three-fourths of their length. Abdomen of male clothed with long hair below. Wings with crenulated (scalloped) margin. Forewings with vein 3 from before angle of cell and veins 7 to 9 stalked from before upper angle. Vein 10 from cell, sometimes connected with veins 8 and 9. Vein 11 given off from vein 12, which rarely anastomosing with vein 10. Hindwings with vein 3 from near angle of cell.
