= Mesothisa =

Scientific classification
- Kingdom: Animalia
- Phylum: Arthropoda
- Class: Insecta
- Order: Lepidoptera
- Family: Geometridae
- Genus: Mesothisa; Warren, 1905

Type species
- Mesothisa flaccida Warren, 1905

Genus of moths

Mesothisa is a genus of moths in the family Geometridae described by Warren in 1905.

== Species ==
Some species of this genus are:

- Mesothisa cinnamonea Carcasson, 1964
- Mesothisa crassilinea Carcasson, 1962
- Mesothisa dubiefi Viette, 1977
- Mesothisa flaccida Warren, 1905
- Mesothisa gracililinea Warren, 1905
- Mesothisa misanga Herbulot, 1997
- Mesothisa ozola Prout, 1926
- Mesothisa pulverata Carcasson, 1964
- Mesothisa royi Herbulot, 1954
- Mesothisa substigmata Carcasson, 1964
- Mesothisa tanala Herbulot, 1968
