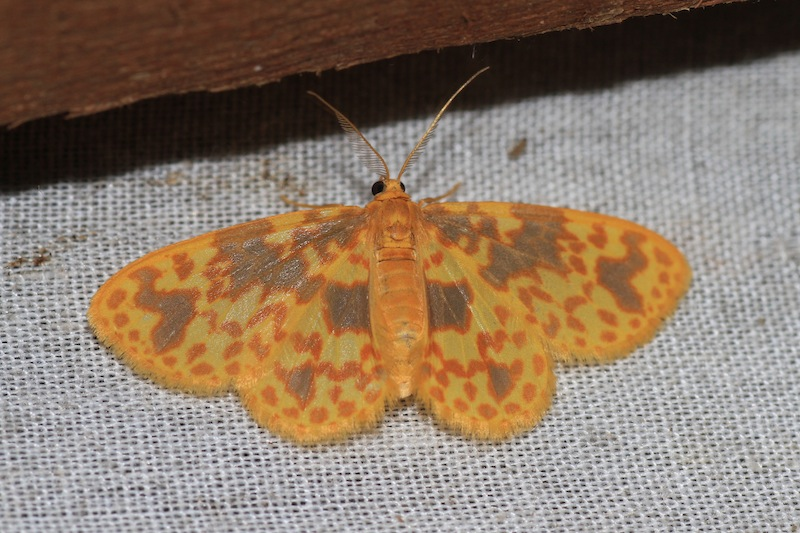
- Microplutodes hilaropa, Borneo

Scientific classification
- Kingdom: Animalia
- Phylum: Arthropoda
- Clade: Pancrustacea
- Class: Insecta
- Order: Lepidoptera
- Family: Geometridae
- Tribe: Plutodini
- Genus: Microplutodes; Holloway, 1993

= Microplutodes =

Genus of moths

Microplutodes is a genus of moths in the family Geometridae. The genus was erected by Jeremy Daniel Holloway in 1993.

== Species ==
- Microplutodes hilaropa (Meyrick, 1897) Borneo, Sumatra
- Microplutodes tristis (Swinhoe, 1902) Philippines (Luzon)
- Microplutodes iridaria (Debauche, 1941) Sulawesi
