= Megazancla =

Scientific classification
- Kingdom: Animalia
- Phylum: Arthropoda
- Class: Insecta
- Order: Lepidoptera
- Family: Geometridae
- Genus: Megazancla

Genus of moths

Megazancla is a genus of moths in the family Geometridae.
