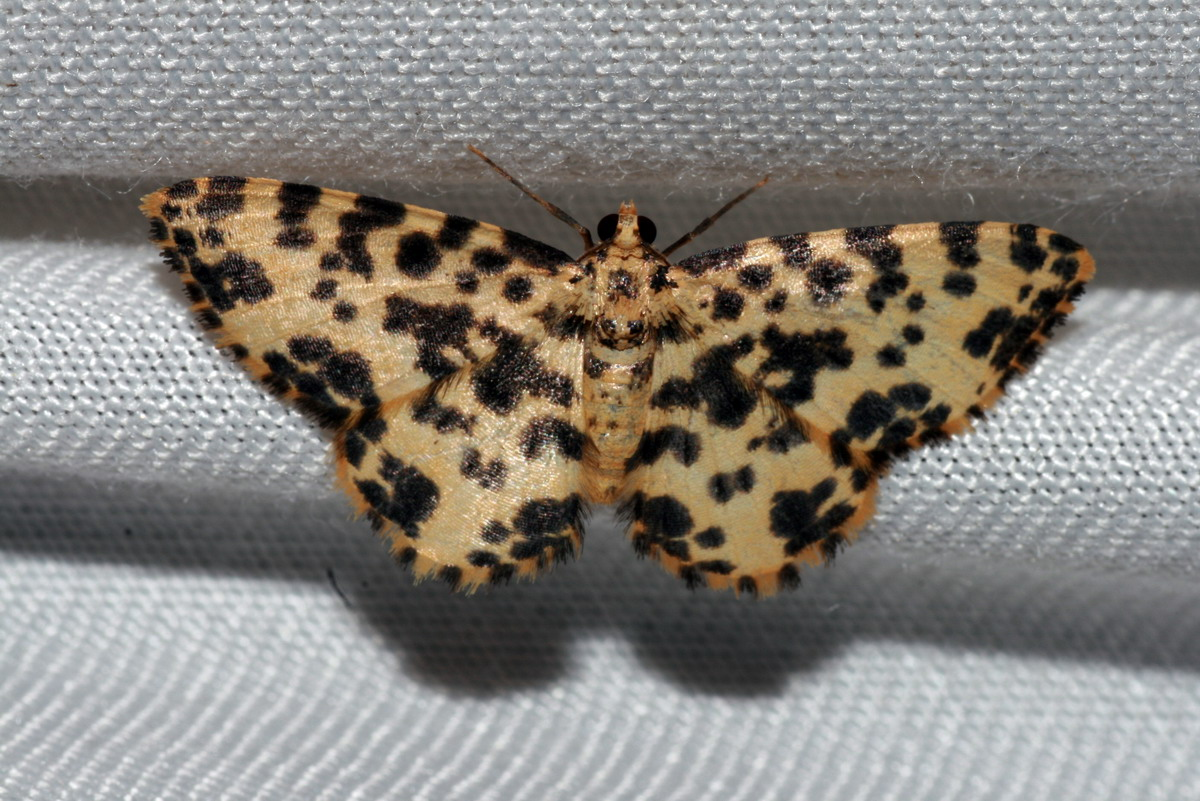
- Monocerotesa proximesta

Scientific classification
- Kingdom: Animalia
- Phylum: Arthropoda
- Class: Insecta
- Order: Lepidoptera
- Family: Geometridae
- Subfamily: Ennominae
- Tribe: Boarmiini
- Genus: Monocerotesa; Wehrli, 1937

= Monocerotesa =

Genus of moths

Monocerotesa is a genus of moth in the family Geometridae.

== Species ==
- Monocerotesa abraxides (Prout, 1914)
- Monocerotesa coalescens (Bastelberger, 1909)
- Monocerotesa conjuncta (Wileman, 1912)
- Monocerotesa flavescens Inoue, 1998
- Monocerotesa hypomesta (Prout, 1937)
- Monocerotesa leptogramma Wehrli, 1937
- Monocerotesa levata (Prout, 1926)
- Monocerotesa locoscripta Holloway, 1994
- Monocerotesa lutearia (Leech 1891)
- Monocerotesa maculilinea (Warren, 1905)
- Monocerotesa minuta (Warren, 1905)
- Monocerotesa papuensis (Warren, 1907)
- Monocerotesa phoeba (Prout, 1916)
- Monocerotesa proximesta Holloway, 1994
- Monocerotesa pygmaearia (Leech 1897)
- Monocerotesa radiata (Warren 1897)
- Monocerotesa seriepunctata (Prout, 1929)
- Monocerotesa strigata (Warren 1893)
- Monocerotesa subcostistriga (Prout, 1916)
- Monocerotesa trichroma Wehrli, 1937
- Monocerotesa unifasciata Inoue, 1998
- Monocerotesa virgata (Wileman, 1912)
- Monocerotesa viridochrea (Warren, 1907)
