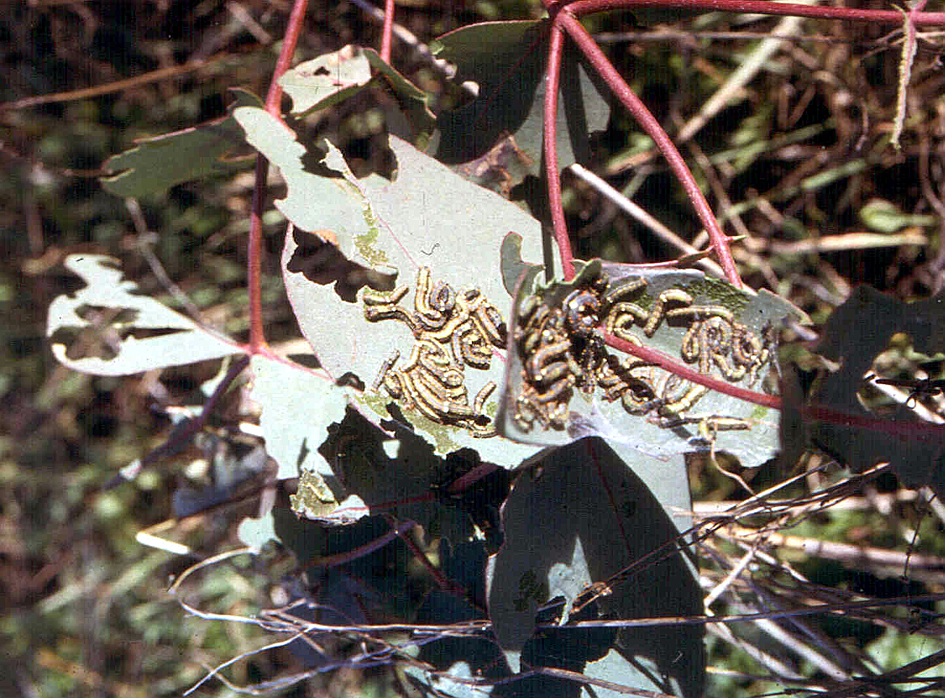
- Caterpillars of Mnesampela privata

Scientific classification
- Domain: Eukaryota
- Kingdom: Animalia
- Phylum: Arthropoda
- Class: Insecta
- Order: Lepidoptera
- Family: Geometridae
- Tribe: Nacophorini
- Genus: Mnesampela; Guest, 1887

= Mnesampela =

Genus of moths

Mnesampela is a genus of moths in the family Geometridae. It was described by Edward Guest in 1887.

== Species ==
- Mnesampela arida McQuillan, 1985
- Mnesampela athertonensis McQuillan, 1985
- Mnesampela comarcha Guest, 1887
- Mnesampela heliochrysa (Lower, 1893)
- Mnesampela kunama McQuillan, 1985
- Mnesampela lenaea Meyrick, 1892 – rippled gum moth
- Mnesampela privata (Guenée, 1857) – autumn gum moth
