= Mychonia =

Scientific classification
- Kingdom: Animalia
- Phylum: Arthropoda
- Clade: Pancrustacea
- Class: Insecta
- Order: Lepidoptera
- Family: Geometridae
- Genus: Mychonia; Herrich-Schäffer, 1855

Type species
- Mychonia corticinaria Herrich-Schäffer, 1855

Genus of moths

Mychonia is a genus of moths in the family Geometridae. The genus was erected by Gottlieb August Wilhelm Herrich-Schäffer in 1855.

== Species ==
- Mychonia bityla H. Druce, 1892
- Mychonia brunnea Warren, 1907
- Mychonia cervina Warren, 1907
- Mychonia corticinaria Herrich-Schäffer, 1855
- Mychonia divaricata Dognin, 1906
- Mychonia excisa Warren, 1906
- Mychonia galanata Dognin, 1893
- Mychonia graphica Warren, 1904
- Mychonia infuscata Dognin, 1900
- Mychonia melanospila Warren, 1907
- Mychonia ochracea Dognin, 1911
- Mychonia rubida Dognin, 1906
- Mychonia tepida Dognin, 1900
- Mychonia violacea Warren, 1907
