= Mictodoca =

Scientific classification
- Kingdom: Animalia
- Phylum: Arthropoda
- Class: Insecta
- Order: Lepidoptera
- Family: Geometridae
- Genus: Mictodoca

Genus of moths

Mictodoca is a genus of moth in the family Geometridae.
