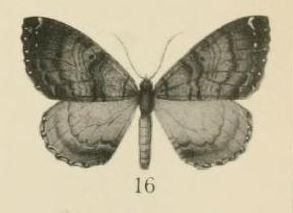

Scientific classification
- Kingdom: Animalia
- Phylum: Arthropoda
- Class: Insecta
- Order: Lepidoptera
- Family: Geometridae
- Subfamily: Larentiinae
- Genus: Mimoclystia; Warren, 1901

Synonyms
- Malgassorhoe Herbulot, 1956

= Mimoclystia =

Genus of moths

Mimoclystia is a genus of moths in the family Geometridae described by Warren in 1901.

Type species: Mimoclystia undulosata Warren, 1901

== Species ==
Some species of this genus are:

- Mimoclystia acme (Prout, 1922)
- Mimoclystia andringitra Herbulot, 1963
- Mimoclystia bambusarum Herbulot, 1988
- Mimoclystia bergeri (Gaede, 1915)
- Mimoclystia cancellata (Warren, 1899)
- Mimoclystia corticearia (Aurivillius, 1910)
- Mimoclystia deplanata (de Joannis, 1913)
- Mimoclystia dimorpha Herbulot, 1966
- Mimoclystia eucesta D. S. Fletcher, 1958
- Mimoclystia euthygramma (Prout, 1921)
- Mimoclystia explanata (Walker, 1862)
- Mimoclystia griveaudi Herbulot, 1970
- Mimoclystia lichenarum Herbulot, 1963
- Mimoclystia limonias (Prout, 1933)
- Mimoclystia mermera (Prout, 1935)
- Mimoclystia mimetica (Debauche, 1938)
- Mimoclystia pudicata (Walker, 1862)
- Mimoclystia rhodopnoa (Prout, 1928)
- Mimoclystia tepescens Prout, 1922
- Mimoclystia thermochroa (Hampson, 1909)
- Mimoclystia thorenaria (Swinhoe, 1904)
- Mimoclystia toxeres D. S. Fletcher, 1978
- Mimoclystia undulosata Warren, 1901
