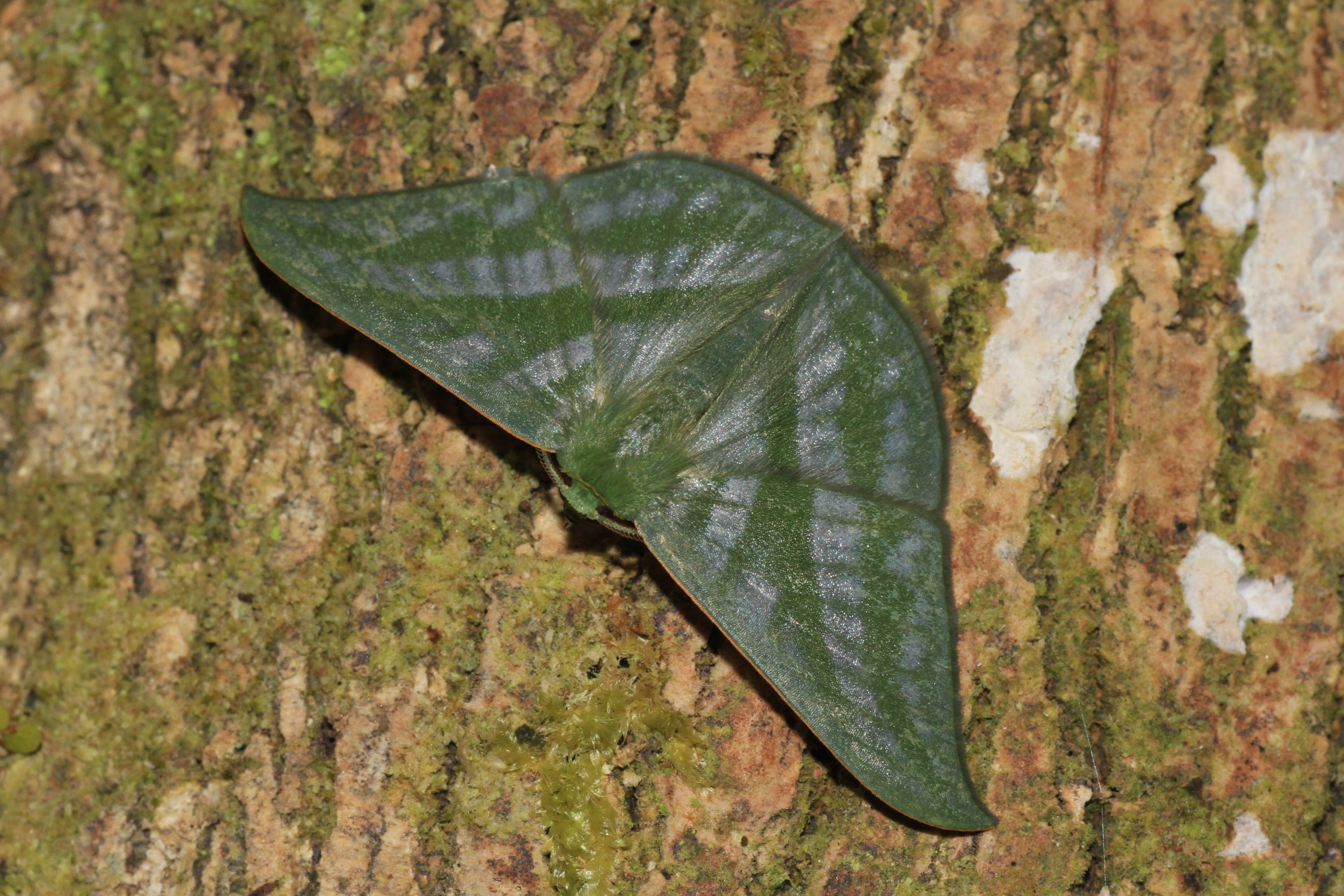
- Mixochlora vittata

Scientific classification
- Kingdom: Animalia
- Phylum: Arthropoda
- Clade: Pancrustacea
- Class: Insecta
- Order: Lepidoptera
- Family: Geometridae
- Genus: Mixochlora

= Mixochlora =

Genus of moths

Mixochlora is a genus of moths in the family Geometridae.

Mixochlora species are characterised by their green colouring with white or silver stripes on their wings.

The name Mixochlora comes from the two Greek words Mixo and Chlora meaning mixed and green.
