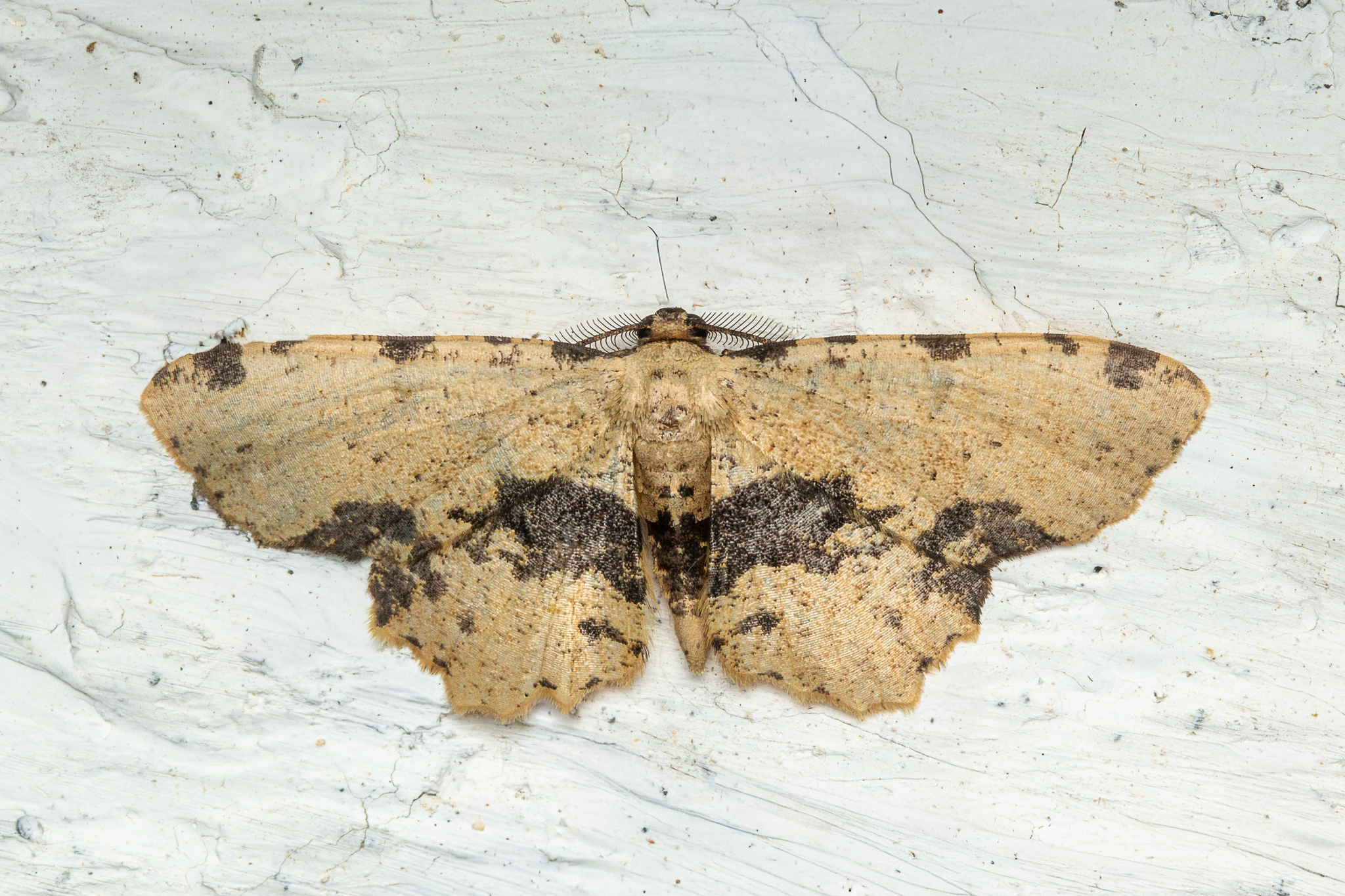
- Microcalicha melanosticta in Arunachal Pradesh, India

Scientific classification
- Kingdom: Animalia
- Phylum: Arthropoda
- Class: Insecta
- Order: Lepidoptera
- Family: Geometridae
- Genus: Microcalicha; Sato, 1981

= Microcalicha =

Genus of moths

Microcalicha is a genus of moths in the family Geometridae first described by Sato in 1981.

== Species ==
- Microcalicha fumosaria (Leech, 1891) Japan, China, Taiwan
- Microcalicha melanosticta (Hampson) China
- Microcalicha sordida (Butler, 1878) Japan, Korea
- Microcalicha minima (Warren, 1896) north-eastern Himalayas, Borneo, Sumatra
- Microcalicha delika (Swinhoe, 1902) Borneo, Sumatra, southern Thailand
- Microcalicha insolitaria (Leech) China
- Microcalicha chloralphus (Wehrli) China
- Microcalicha punctimarginaria (Leech, 1897) China, Borneo, Sumatra, Peninsular Malaysia
