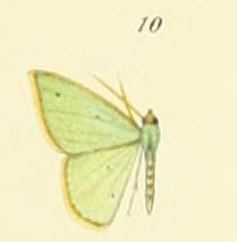
- Metallochlora militaris

Scientific classification
- Kingdom: Animalia
- Phylum: Arthropoda
- Class: Insecta
- Order: Lepidoptera
- Family: Geometridae
- Subfamily: Geometrinae
- Genus: Metallochlora; Warren, 1896

= Metallochlora =

Genus of moths

Metallochlora is a genus of moths in the family Geometridae described by Warren in 1896.

== Species ==
Some species are:

- Metallochlora ametalla Turner, 1910
- Metallochlora grisea (Prout, 1915)
- Metallochlora lineata Warren, 1896 (Australia)
- Metallochlora meeki Warren, 1896
- Metallochlora militaris (Lucas, 1891) (Australia)
- Metallochlora neomela (Meyrick, 1889)
- Metallochlora venusta (Warren, 1896) (Australia, Papua New Guinea)
