= Middletonia =

Scientific classification
- Kingdom: Animalia
- Phylum: Arthropoda
- Class: Insecta
- Order: Lepidoptera
- Family: Geometridae
- Subfamily: Ennominae
- Tribe: Nacophorini
- Genus: Middletonia; Turner, 1947

Species
- Middletonia hemichroma (Turner, 1947); Middletonia suavis Turner, 1947

Genus of moths

Middletonia is a genus of moths in the family Geometridae.
