= Matanga rubicunda =

Scientific classification
- Kingdom: Animalia
- Phylum: Arthropoda
- Clade: Pancrustacea
- Class: Insecta
- Order: Lepidoptera
- Family: Geometridae
- Subfamily: Larentiinae
- Genus: Matanga; Holloway, 1997
- Species: M. rubicunda

Binomial name
- Matanga rubicunda (Swinhoe, 1902)

Species of moths

Matanga is a genus of moth in the family Geometridae. It contains only a single species, Matanga rubicunda.
