= Merida =

Mérida or Merida may refer to:

== Places ==
- Mérida (state), one of the 23 states which make up Venezuela
- Mérida, Mérida, the capital city of the state of Mérida, Venezuela
- Merida, Leyte, Philippines, a municipality in the province of Leyte
- Mérida, Spain, the capital city of the autonomous community of Extremadura
- Mérida, Yucatán, Mexico, the capital city of the state of Yucatán
- Merida or Marida, an ancient name for Mardin, Turkey

== Football clubs ==
- CP Mérida, a defunct club in Mérida, Spain
- Mérida UD, a defunct club in Mérida, Spain
- Mérida AD, a club in Mérida, Spain
- Imperio de Mérida CP, Mérida, Spain
- Estudiantes de Mérida, Venezuela
- Mérida F.C., Mexico

== Other uses ==
- Merida (Brave), the main character of the 2012 animated film Brave
- Merida (Dragon Prince), a fictional people created by fantasy author Melanie Rawn for her Dragon Prince series
- Merida (moth), a genus of moth in the family Geometridae
- Merida Bikes, one of the world's largest bicycle makers, based in Taiwan
- Mérida Initiative, an American-led drug interdiction program for Mexico and Central America
- Mérida sunangel (Heliangelus spencei), a species of hummingbird native to Venezuela
- Daniel Mérida (born 2004), Spanish tennis player
- Fran Mérida (born 1990), Spanish footballer
- SS Merida, several ships with the name Merida
- Bahrain–Merida Pro Cycling Team, a professional cycling team
