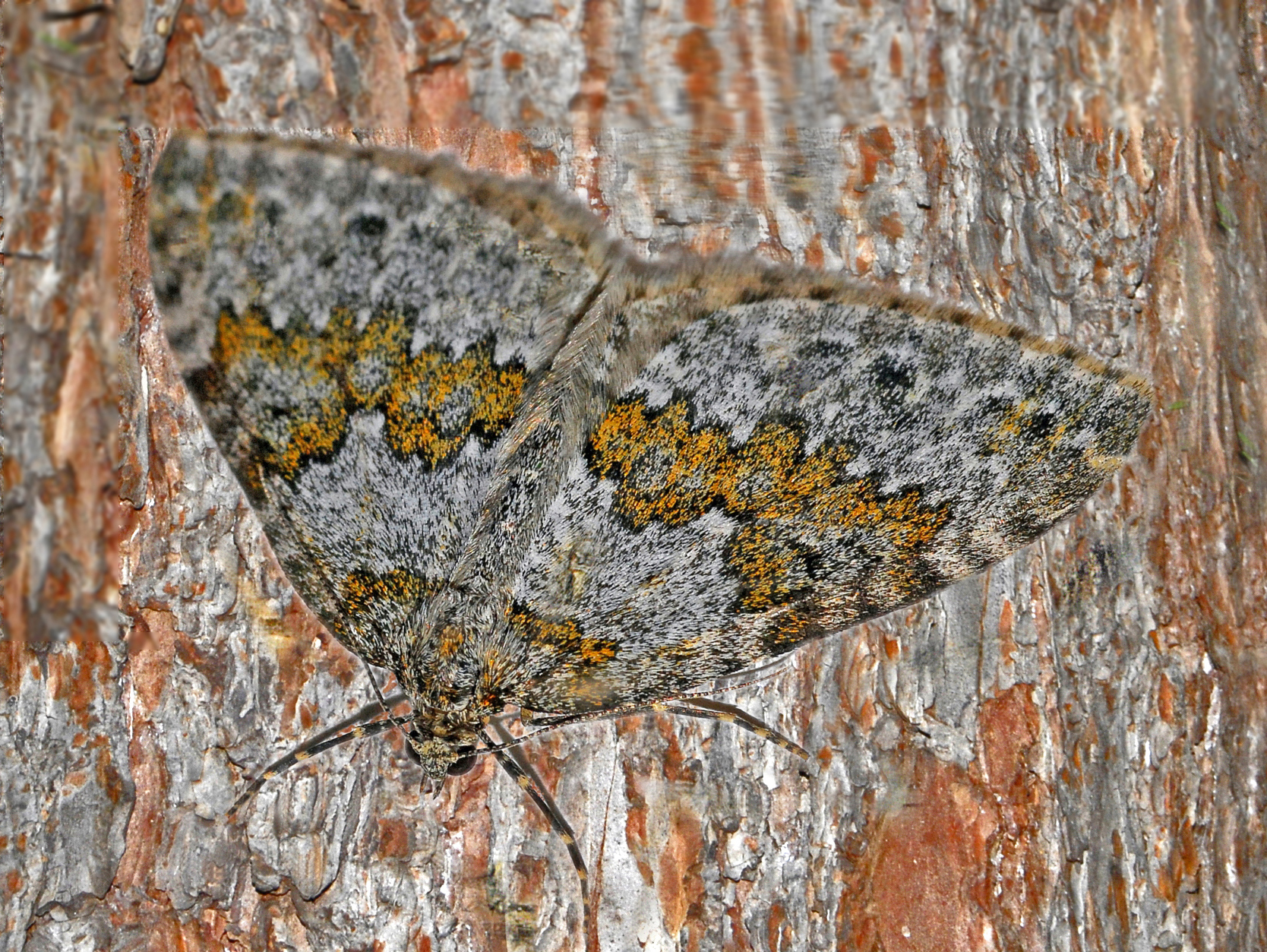
- Adult of Entephria infidaria

Scientific classification
- Kingdom: Animalia
- Phylum: Arthropoda
- Class: Insecta
- Order: Lepidoptera
- Family: Geometridae
- Genus: Entephria
- Species: E. infidaria

Binomial name
- Entephria infidaria (La Harpe, 1853)

Synonyms
- Larentia infidaria De la Harpe, 1853

= Entephria infidaria =

Species of Moth

Entephria infidaria is a moth of the family Geometridae.

== Etymology ==
The species name infidaria derives from the Latin infidus, meaning uncertain, unreliable, because of the great similarity with two other species (Entephria caesiata and Entephria flavicinctata).

== Distribution ==
This species can be found in the mountainous areas of Europe (Austria, Czech Republic, France, Italy, Poland, Romania, Slovenia and Switzerland). It is present in mountain forests and meadows, in woody areas, stony slopes, rocky valleys and gorges, forest edges and in shady, damp forest valleys, at an elevation of 600–2,000 metres (2,000–6,600 ft) above sea level.

This species is very similar to Entephria caesiata and Entephria flavicinctata.

== Description ==
Entephria infidaria can reach a wingspan of 27–31 millimetres (1.1–1.2 in). The forewing ground colour is ash grey, with a large wavy brown middle band. The deep sinus of the inner edge of the middle band is very characteristic. Also the first grey band is very wide, with a small brown band. The hindwings are pale white.

== Biology ==
Entephria infidaria is usually a univoltine species, with a partial 2nd generation in the southern countries. These moths are nocturnal, resting on shady rocks during the day. Adults are on wing from June to August. The polyphagous larvae feed on lower herbaceous plants and shrubs, mainly on Alchemilla vulgaris, Fagus sylvatica, Fragaria vesca, Juniperus communis, Lonicera xylosteum, Rubus fruticosus. Sedum album, Saxifraga, Vaccinium myrtillus, Salix and Geranium species.

== Bibliography ==
De la Harpe, J. C., 1853: Faune Suisse. Lépidoptères. IV. Partie. Phalénides. 1-160 + 1 pl.
