= Archirhoe =

Scientific classification
- Kingdom: Animalia
- Phylum: Arthropoda
- Class: Insecta
- Order: Lepidoptera
- Family: Geometridae
- Tribe: Hydriomenini
- Genus: Archirhoe; Herbulot, 1951

Genus of moths

Archirhoe is a genus of moths in the family Geometridae.

== Species ==
- Archirhoe associata (McDunnough, 1941)
- Archirhoe indefinata (Grossbeck, 1907)
- Archirhoe multipunctata (Taylor, 1906)
- Archirhoe neomexicana (Hulst, 1896)
