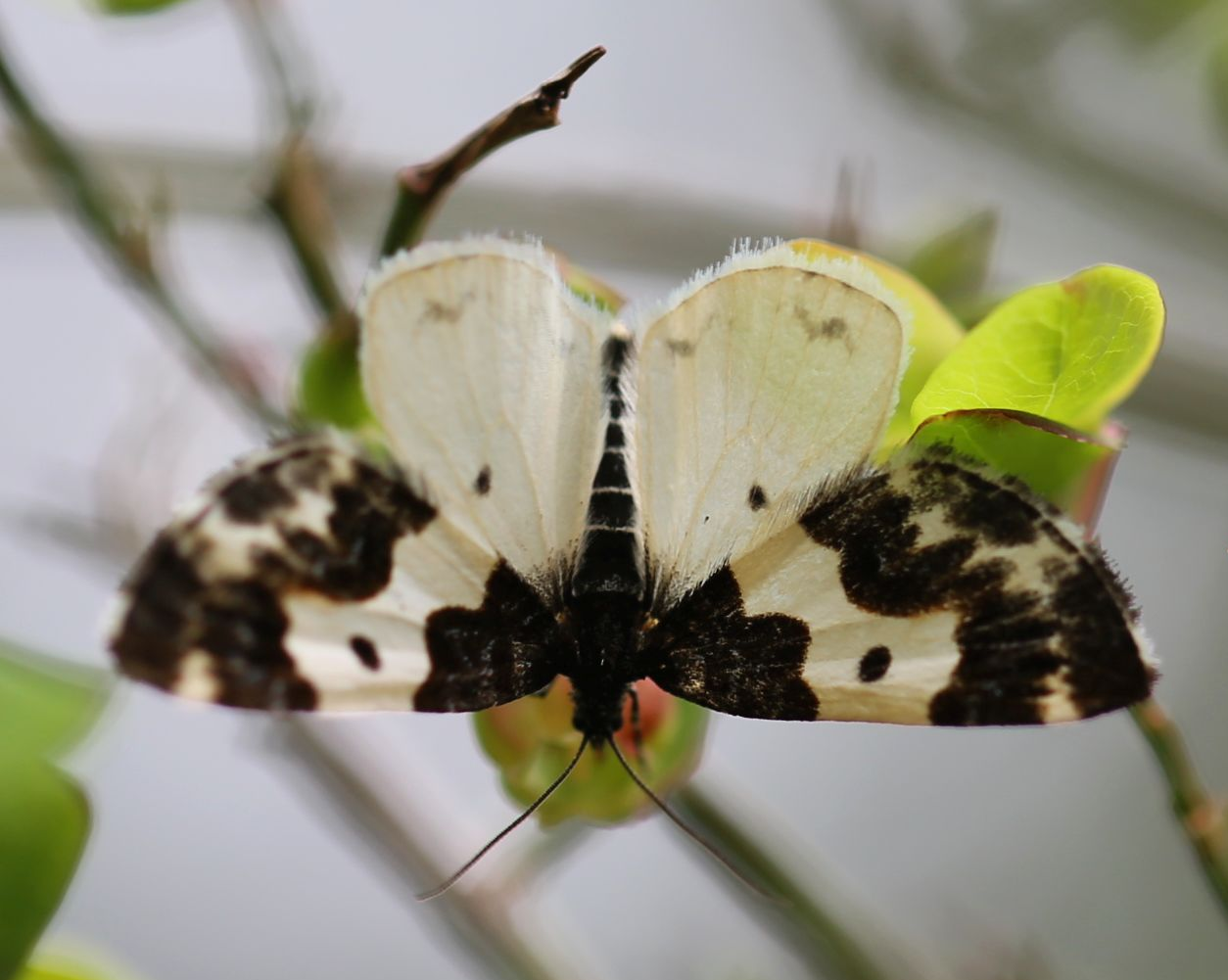

Scientific classification
- Kingdom: Animalia
- Phylum: Arthropoda
- Class: Insecta
- Order: Lepidoptera
- Family: Geometridae
- Tribe: Hydriomenini
- Genus: Mesoleuca
- Species: M. gratulata

Binomial name
- Mesoleuca gratulata (Walker, 1862)

= Mesoleuca gratulata =

Species of moth

Mesoleuca gratulata, known generally as the western white-ribboned carpet or half-white carpet moth, is a species of geometrid moth in the family Geometridae. It is found in North America.

The MONA or Hodges number for Mesoleuca gratulata is 7308.

== Subspecies ==
These two subspecies belong to the species Mesoleuca gratulata:

- Mesoleuca gratulata gratulata
- Mesoleuca gratulata latialbata Barnes & McDunnough
