= Archirhoe associata =

Scientific classification
- Kingdom: Animalia
- Phylum: Arthropoda
- Class: Insecta
- Order: Lepidoptera
- Family: Geometridae
- Tribe: Hydriomenini
- Genus: Archirhoe
- Species: A. associata

Binomial name
- Archirhoe associata (McDunnough, 1941)

Species of moth

Archirhoe associata is a species of geometrid moth in the family Geometridae.

The MONA or Hodges number for Archirhoe associata is 7297.
