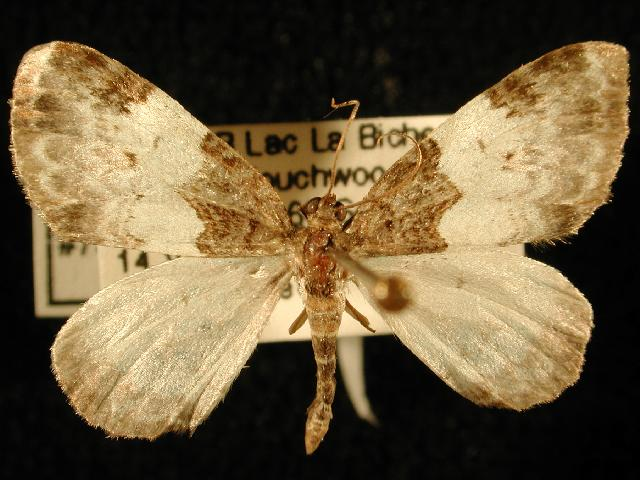

Scientific classification
- Kingdom: Animalia
- Phylum: Arthropoda
- Class: Insecta
- Order: Lepidoptera
- Family: Geometridae
- Tribe: Hydriomenini
- Genus: Mesoleuca
- Species: M. ruficillata

Binomial name
- Mesoleuca ruficillata (Guenée in Boisduval & Guenée, 1858)

= Mesoleuca ruficillata =

Species of moth

Mesoleuca ruficillata, the white-ribboned carpet moth, is a species of geometrid moth in the family Geometridae. It is found in North America.

The MONA or Hodges number for Mesoleuca ruficillata is 7307.
