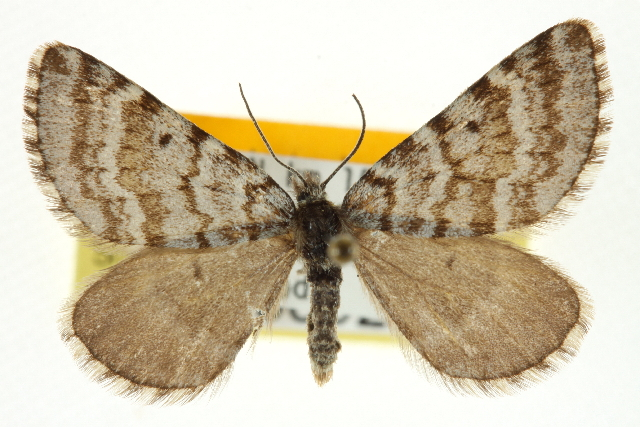

Scientific classification
- Kingdom: Animalia
- Phylum: Arthropoda
- Class: Insecta
- Order: Lepidoptera
- Family: Geometridae
- Tribe: Hydriomenini
- Genus: Entephria
- Species: E. lynda

Binomial name
- Entephria lynda Troubridge, 1997

= Entephria lynda =

Species of moth

Entephria lynda is a species of geometrid moth in the family Geometridae. It is found in North America.

The MONA or Hodges number for Entephria lynda is 7303.1.
