= Archirhoe indefinata =

Scientific classification
- Kingdom: Animalia
- Phylum: Arthropoda
- Class: Insecta
- Order: Lepidoptera
- Family: Geometridae
- Tribe: Hydriomenini
- Genus: Archirhoe
- Species: A. indefinata

Binomial name
- Archirhoe indefinata (Grossbeck, 1907)

Species of moth

Archirhoe indefinata is a species of geometrid moth in the family Geometridae.

The MONA or Hodges number for Archirhoe indefinata is 7296.
