= Ersephila indistincta =

Scientific classification
- Kingdom: Animalia
- Phylum: Arthropoda
- Class: Insecta
- Order: Lepidoptera
- Family: Geometridae
- Tribe: Hydriomenini
- Genus: Ersephila
- Species: E. indistincta

Binomial name
- Ersephila indistincta Hulst, 1898

Species of moth

Ersephila indistincta is a species of geometrid moth in the family Geometridae. It is found in North America.

The MONA or Hodges number for Ersephila indistincta is 7279.
