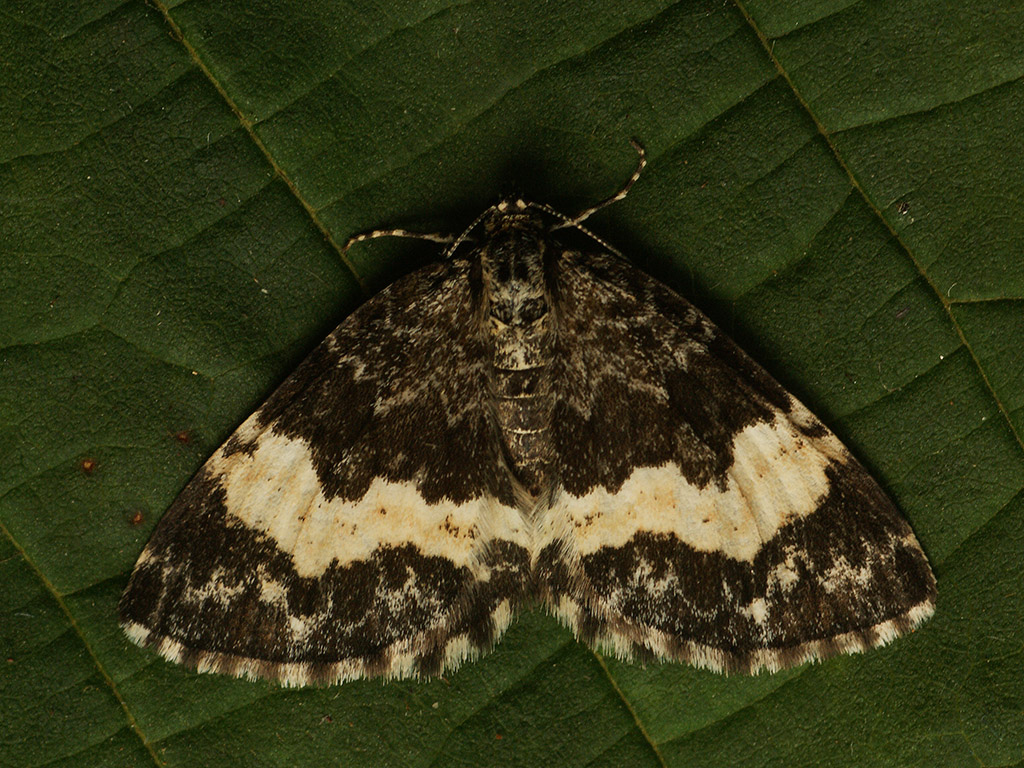
- Spargania luctuata

Scientific classification
- Kingdom: Animalia
- Phylum: Arthropoda
- Class: Insecta
- Order: Lepidoptera
- Family: Geometridae
- Tribe: Hydriomenini
- Genus: Spargania; Guenée, 1857

Synonyms
- Amygdalopteryx Warren, 1897; Eriopygidia Warren, 1900; Arima Kaye, 1901

= Spargania =

Genus of moths

Spargania is a genus of moths in the family Geometridae erected by Achille Guenée in 1857.

== Species ==
- Spargania aurata (Grote, 1882)
- Spargania bellipicta Warren, 1901
- Spargania luctuata (Denis & Schiffermüller, 1775) – white-banded carpet
- Spargania magnoliata Guenée, 1857
- Spargania viridescens (Grossbeck, 1910)
