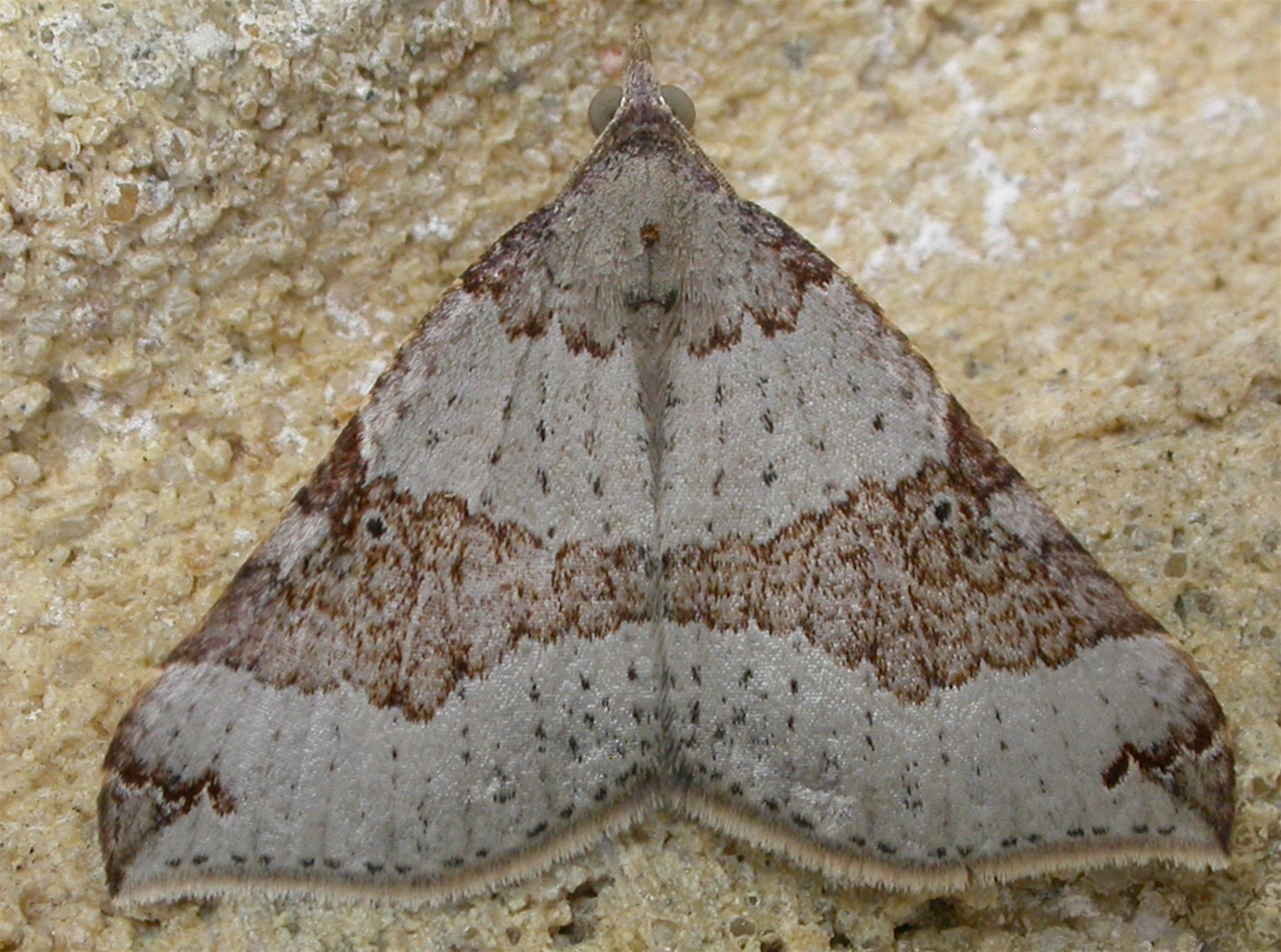

Scientific classification
- Kingdom: Animalia
- Phylum: Arthropoda
- Class: Insecta
- Order: Lepidoptera
- Family: Geometridae
- Genus: Anachloris
- Species: A. uncinata

Binomial name
- Anachloris uncinata Guenée, 1863

Synonyms
- Cidaria gallinata

= Anachloris uncinata =

Species of moth

Anachloris uncinata, the hook-winged carpet, is a moth of the family Geometridae. It was first described by Achille Guenée in 1863 and is found in the southern half of Australia.

The wingspan is 30 mm.

The larvae feed on Hibbertia obtusifolia and Hibbertia stricta.
