= Entephria separata =

Scientific classification
- Kingdom: Animalia
- Phylum: Arthropoda
- Clade: Pancrustacea
- Class: Insecta
- Order: Lepidoptera
- Family: Geometridae
- Tribe: Hydriomenini
- Genus: Entephria
- Species: E. separata

Binomial name
- Entephria separata Troubridge, 1997

Species of moth

Entephria separata is a species of geometrid moth in the family Geometridae. It is found in North America.

The MONA or Hodges number for Entephria separata is 7306.2.
