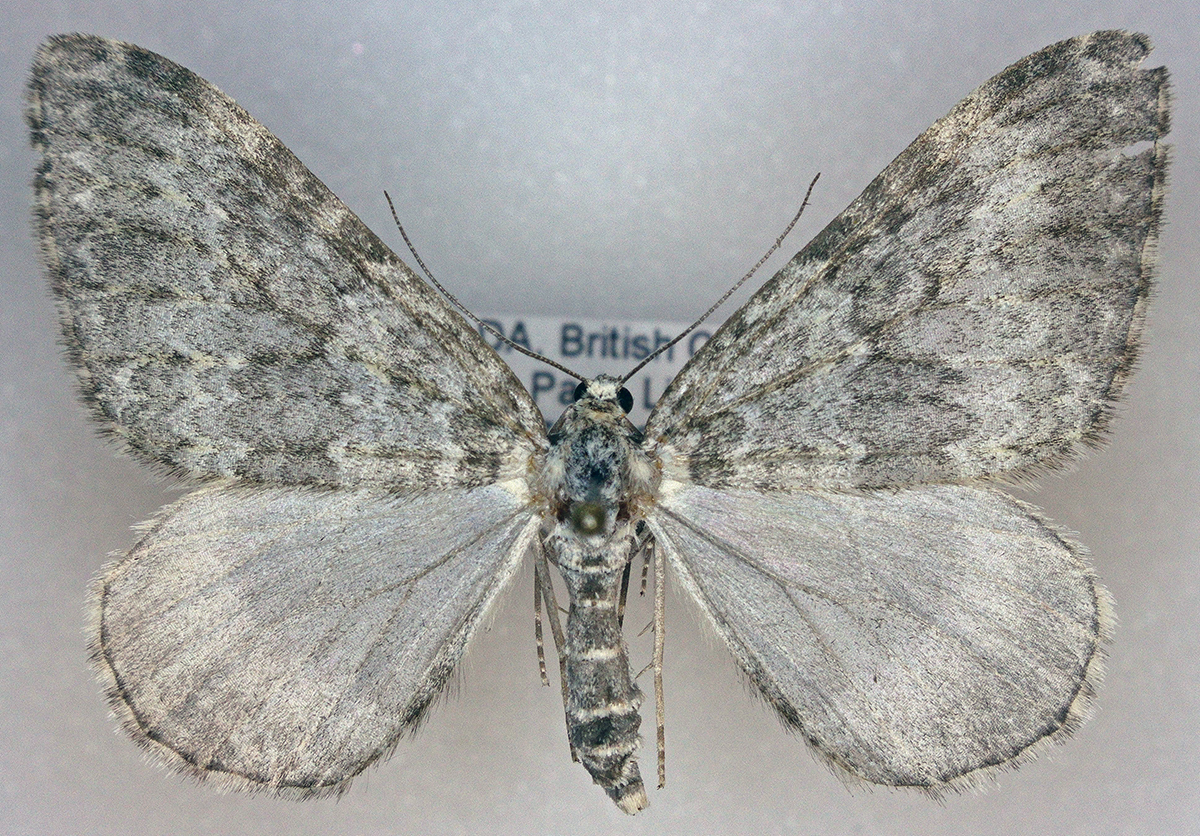

Scientific classification
- Kingdom: Animalia
- Phylum: Arthropoda
- Class: Insecta
- Order: Lepidoptera
- Family: Geometridae
- Tribe: Hydriomenini
- Genus: Entephria
- Species: E. takuata

Binomial name
- Entephria takuata Taylor, 1908

= Entephria takuata =

Species of moth

Entephria takuata is a species of geometrid moth in the family Geometridae. It is found in North America.
