= Eutrepsia inconstans =

Scientific classification
- Kingdom: Animalia
- Phylum: Arthropoda
- Class: Insecta
- Order: Lepidoptera
- Family: Geometridae
- Tribe: Hydriomenini
- Genus: Eutrepsia
- Species: E. inconstans

Binomial name
- Eutrepsia inconstans (Geyer, 1837)

Synonyms
- Ardonea secreta Walker, 1865; Emplocia cephisaria Grote, 1881; Melanchroia inconstans Geyer, 1837; Melanchroia spuria Edwards, 1884

Species of moth

Eutrepsia inconstans is a species of geometrid moth in the family Geometridae. It is found in Central America and North America.

The MONA or Hodges number for Eutrepsia inconstans is 7284.
