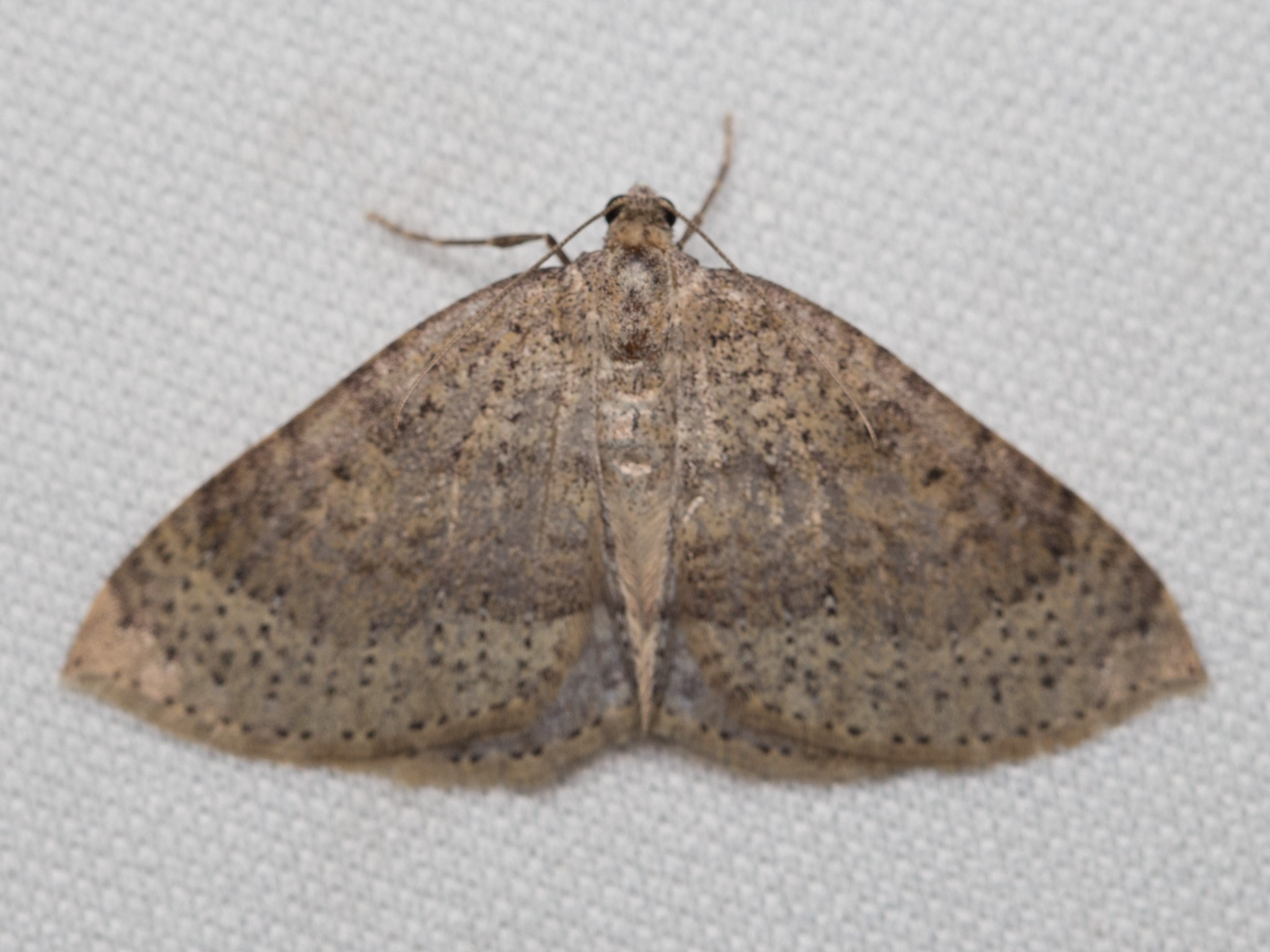

Scientific classification
- Kingdom: Animalia
- Phylum: Arthropoda
- Class: Insecta
- Order: Lepidoptera
- Family: Geometridae
- Tribe: Hydriomenini
- Genus: Archirhoe
- Species: A. multipunctata

Binomial name
- Archirhoe multipunctata (Taylor, 1906)

= Archirhoe multipunctata =

Species of moth

Archirhoe multipunctata is a species of geometrid moth in the family Geometridae.
