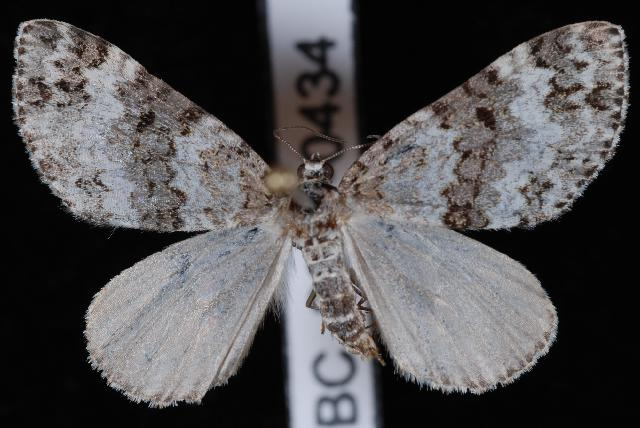

Scientific classification
- Kingdom: Animalia
- Phylum: Arthropoda
- Class: Insecta
- Order: Lepidoptera
- Family: Geometridae
- Tribe: Hydriomenini
- Genus: Spargania
- Species: S. magnoliata

Binomial name
- Spargania magnoliata Guenée in Boisduval & Guenée, 1858

= Spargania magnoliata =

Species of moth

Spargania magnoliata, the double-banded carpet moth, is a species of geometrid moth in the family Geometridae. It is found in North America.

The MONA or Hodges number for Spargania magnoliata is 7312.
