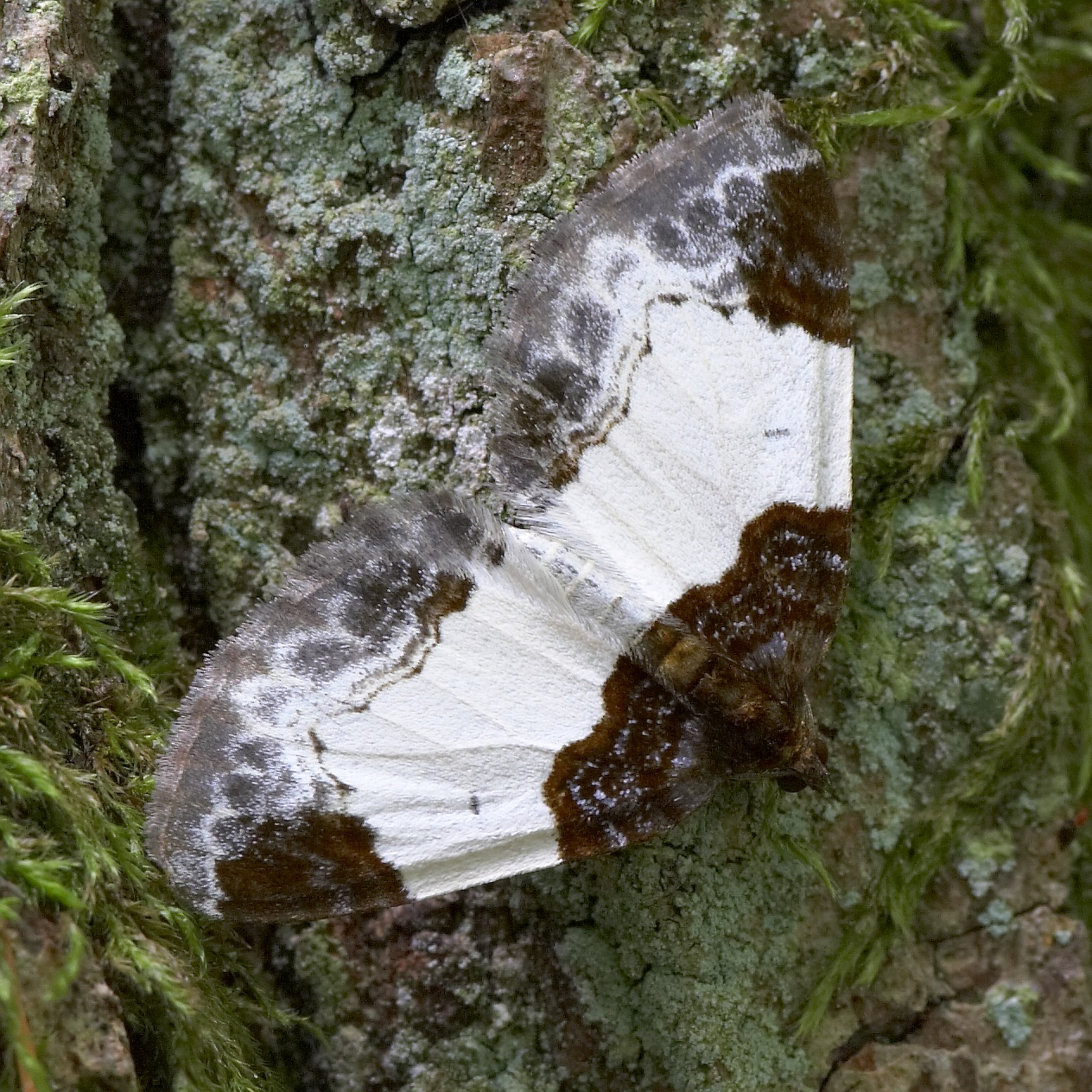
- Mesoleuca albicillata

Scientific classification
- Kingdom: Animalia
- Phylum: Arthropoda
- Clade: Pancrustacea
- Class: Insecta
- Order: Lepidoptera
- Family: Geometridae
- Tribe: Hydriomenini
- Genus: Mesoleuca; Hübner, 1825

= Mesoleuca =

Genus of moths

Mesoleuca is a genus of moths in the family Geometridae first described by Jacob Hübner in 1825. The name is derived from the Greek mesos (middle) and leucos (white) in reference to the white area in the middle of the forewing.

== Species include ==
- Mesoleuca albicillata – beautiful carpet
- Mesoleuca gratulata – western white-ribboned carpet moth
- Mesoleuca ruficillata – white-ribboned carpet moth

== See also ==
- Tony-2 (November 1, 2005). "Genus Mesoleuca - White-Ribboned Carpets". BugGuide.
- "Mesoleuca Hübner, 1825". ITIS.
