= Hibbertia simulans =

Scientific classification
- Kingdom: Plantae
- Clade: Tracheophytes
- Clade: Angiosperms
- Clade: Eudicots
- Order: Dilleniales
- Family: Dilleniaceae
- Genus: Hibbertia
- Species: H. simulans

Binomial name
- Hibbertia simulans Toelken

Species of flowering plant

Hibbertia simulans is a species of flowering plant in the family Dilleniaceae and is endemic to New South Wales. It is a much-branched shrub with softly-hairy foliage, linear leaves and yellow flowers with eight to ten stamens on one side of two hairy carpels.

== Description ==
Hibbertia simulans is much-branched shrub that typically grows to a height of 30–80 cm (12–31 in) and has softly-hairy foliage. The leaves are linear, 3.5–6.0 mm (0.14–0.24 in) long, 0.7–1.5 mm (0.028–0.059 in) wide on a petiole 0.2–0.5 mm (0.0079–0.0197 in) long, and with the edges rolled under. The flowers are arranged singly on the ends of branches and short side shoots with linear bracts 2.3–3.5 mm (0.091–0.138 in) long and 025–0.5 mm (0.984–0.020 in) wide at the base. The five sepal are joined at the base, the outer lobes slightly longer but narrower than the inner ones. The petals are yellow, egg-shaped with the narrower end towards the base, 5.8–8.6 mm (0.23–0.34 in) long with eight to ten stamens in a single cluster on one side of two hairy carpels, each carpel with four ovules. Flowering mostly occurs from September to November.

== Taxonomy ==
Hibbertia simulans was first formally described in 2000 by Hellmut R. Toelken in the Journal of the Adelaide Botanic Gardens from specimens collected by Ernest Francis Constable collected on Mount Costigan (near Tuena, New South Wales). The specific epithet (simulans) means "resembling", referring to a similarity to "forms in the H. stricta complex".

== Distribution and habitat ==
This hibbertia grows in scrub vegetation on mountain tips and wetter areas of central and southern New South Wales.

== See also ==
- List of Hibbertia species
