= Spargania bellipicta =

Scientific classification
- Kingdom: Animalia
- Phylum: Arthropoda
- Class: Insecta
- Order: Lepidoptera
- Family: Geometridae
- Tribe: Hydriomenini
- Genus: Spargania
- Species: S. bellipicta

Binomial name
- Spargania bellipicta Warren, 1901

Species of moth

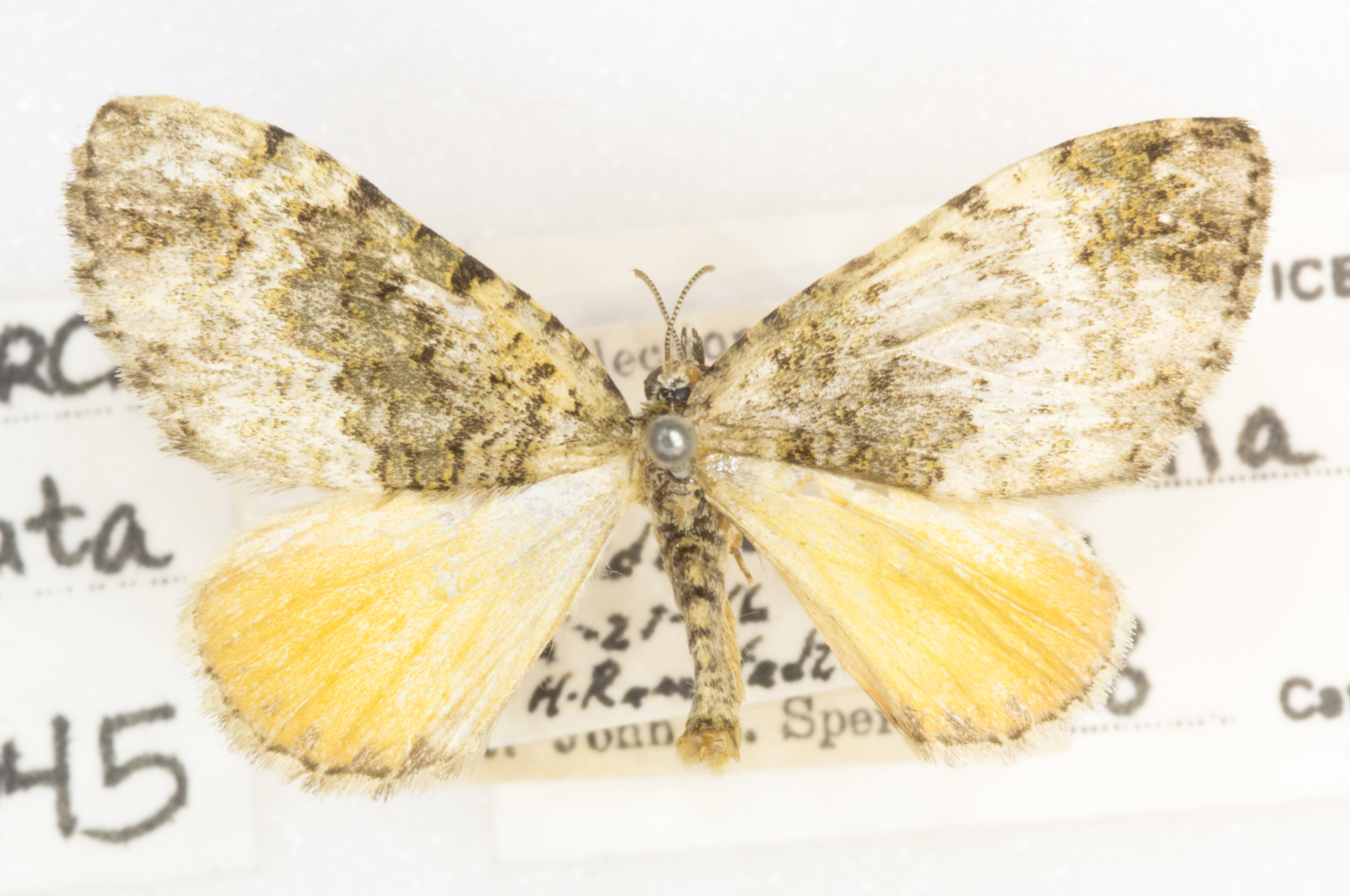
Spargania bellipicta

Spargania bellipicta is a species of geometrid moth in the family Geometridae. It is found in North America.

The MONA or Hodges number for Spargania bellipicta is 7311.
