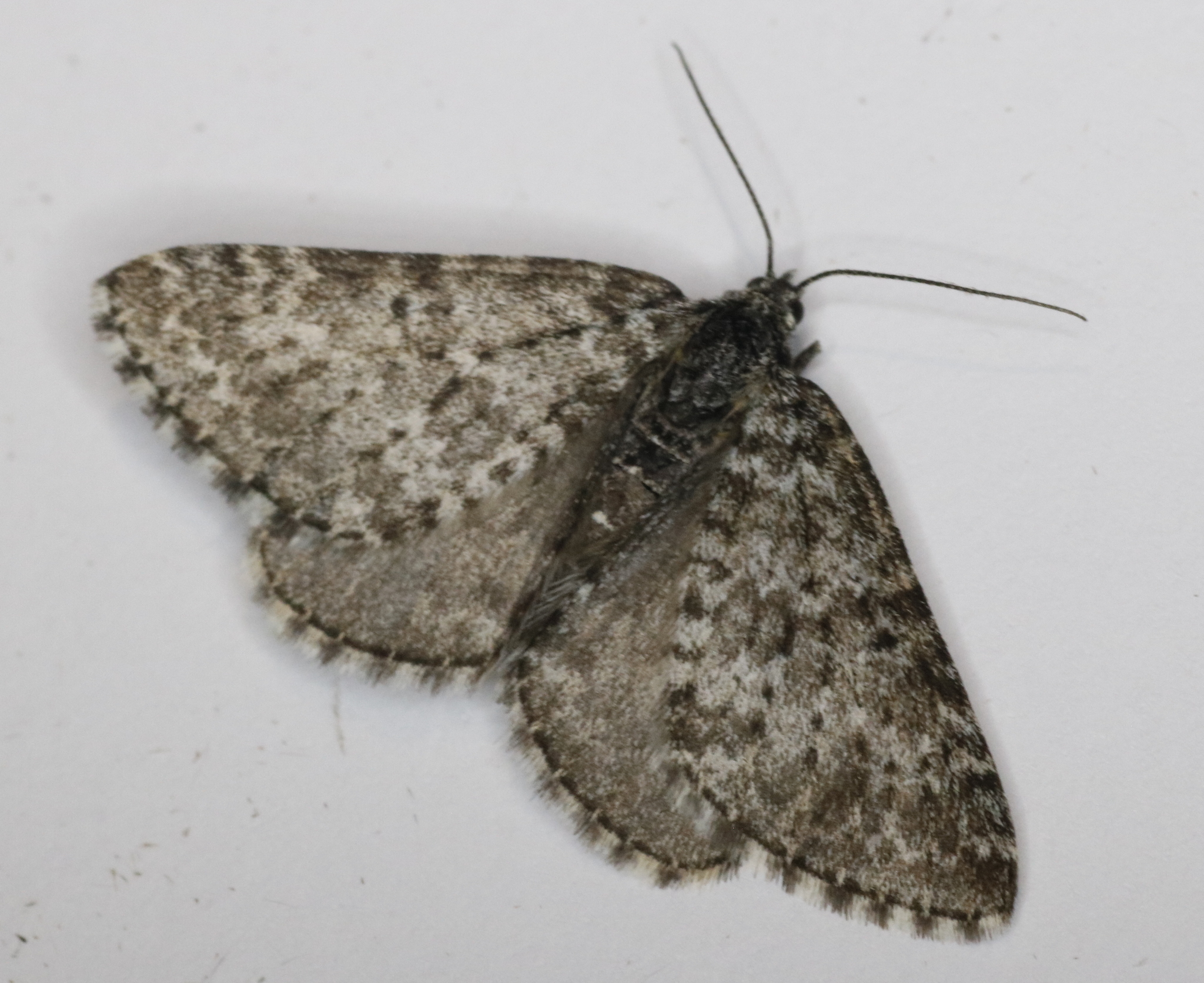

Scientific classification
- Kingdom: Animalia
- Phylum: Arthropoda
- Class: Insecta
- Order: Lepidoptera
- Family: Geometridae
- Tribe: Hydriomenini
- Genus: Entephria
- Species: E. bradorata

Binomial name
- Entephria bradorata (Munroe, 1951)

Synonyms
- Dasyuris polata aleutiata Munroe, 1951; Dasyuris polata bradorata Munroe, 1951

= Entephria bradorata =

Species of moth

Entephria bradorata is a species of geometrid moth in the family Geometridae.

It is found in North America.
