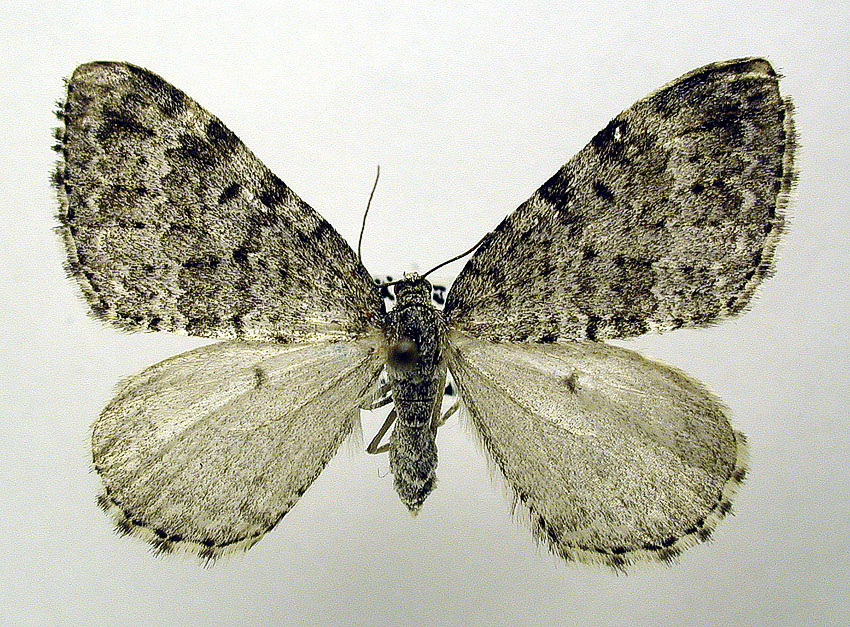
- Grey mountain carpet (E. caesiata) specimen

Scientific classification
- Kingdom: Animalia
- Phylum: Arthropoda
- Clade: Pancrustacea
- Class: Insecta
- Order: Lepidoptera
- Family: Geometridae
- Subfamily: Larentiinae
- Tribe: Hydriomenini
- Genus: Entephria; Hübner, 1825

Type species
- Geometra flavicinctata Hübner, 1813

Diversity
- About 50 species

Synonyms
- Eutephria (lapsus); Glaucopteryx Hübner, 1825; Phaesyloides Bruand, 1847; Trichochlamys Hulst, 1896

= Entephria =

Genus of moths

Entephria is a genus in the geometer moth family (Geometridae). There is no unambiguous common name for these moths; like many other members of their subfamily Larentiinae, they are sometimes called "carpets". The genus was erected by Jacob Hübner in 1825.

Most of its roughly 50 species occur across the Holarctic; from Europe alone, 10 species have been recorded. But some others are found in Africa, and it is suspected that numerous others are presently misplaced in Perizoma and Scotopteryx. In the past, some authors have erroneously treated Entephria species under the genus name Dasyuris.

== Selected species ==
Species of Entephria include:

- Entephria amplicosta Inoue, 1955
- Entephria aurata (Packard, 1867)
- Entephria aurisquamaria Krüger, 2005
- Entephria bastelbergeri (Püngeler, 1902)
- Entephria bradorata (Munroe, 1951)
- Entephria byssata (Aurivillius, 1891)
- Entephria caeruleata (Guenée, 1858)
- Entephria caesiata (Denis & Schiffermüller, 1775) – grey mountain carpet
- Entephria calcephila Tikhonov, 1994
- Entephria chorogensis Viidalepp, 1988
- Entephria contestata Vorbrodt & Müller-Rutz, 1913
- Entephria cyanata (Hübner, 1809)
- Entephria desperata (Staudinger, 1892)
- Entephria epipercna (Prout, 1913) (formerly in Perizoma)
- Entephria expiata (Püngeler, 1904)
- Entephria flavata (Osthelder, 1929)
- Entephria flavicinctata (Hübner, 1813) – yellow-ringed carpet
- Entephria glaucocyma Krüger, 2005
- Entephria ignorata (Staudinger, 1892)
- Entephria infidaria (La Harpe, 1853)
- Entephria intermediaria (Alphéraky, 1883)
- Entephria inventaraia (Grote, 1882)
- Entephria javaria
- Entephria kuznetsovi Viidalepp, 1975
- Entephria lagganata (Taylor, 1908)
- Entephria leucosticta Krüger, 2005
- Entephria luteolata Aubert, 1959
- Entephria lynda Troubridge, 1997
- Entephria maraisi Krüger, 2005
- Entephria mesozona Krüger, 2005
- Entephria multivagata (Hulst, 1881)
- Entephria muscosaria (Christoph, 1893)
- Entephria nigrescens (Hulst, 1900)
- Entephria nobiliaria (Herrich-Schäffer, 1852)
- Entephria occata (Püngeler, 1903)
- Entephria olgae Vasilenko, 1990
- Entephria polata (Duponchel, 1830)
- Entephria punctipes (Curtis, 1835)
- Entephria ravaria (Lederer, 1853)
- Entephria rjabovi Tikhonov, 1994
- Entephria sachaensis Vasilenko, 1990
- Entephria separata Troubridge, 1997
- Entephria takuata (Taylor, 1908)
- Entephria tejmurovi Tikhonov, 1994
- Entephria tzygankovi Wehrli, 1929
- Entephria 'Western Cape'
