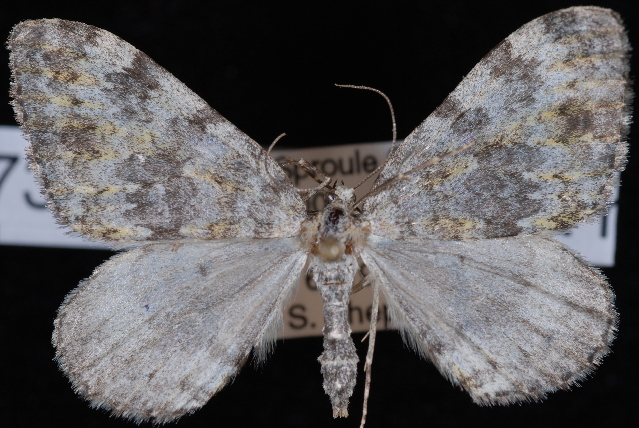

Scientific classification
- Kingdom: Animalia
- Phylum: Arthropoda
- Class: Insecta
- Order: Lepidoptera
- Family: Geometridae
- Tribe: Hydriomenini
- Genus: Entephria
- Species: E. multivagata

Binomial name
- Entephria multivagata (Hulst, 1881)

= Entephria multivagata =

Species of moth

Entephria multivagata is a species of geometrid moth in the family Geometridae. It is found in North America.

The MONA or Hodges number for Entephria multivagata is 7301.
