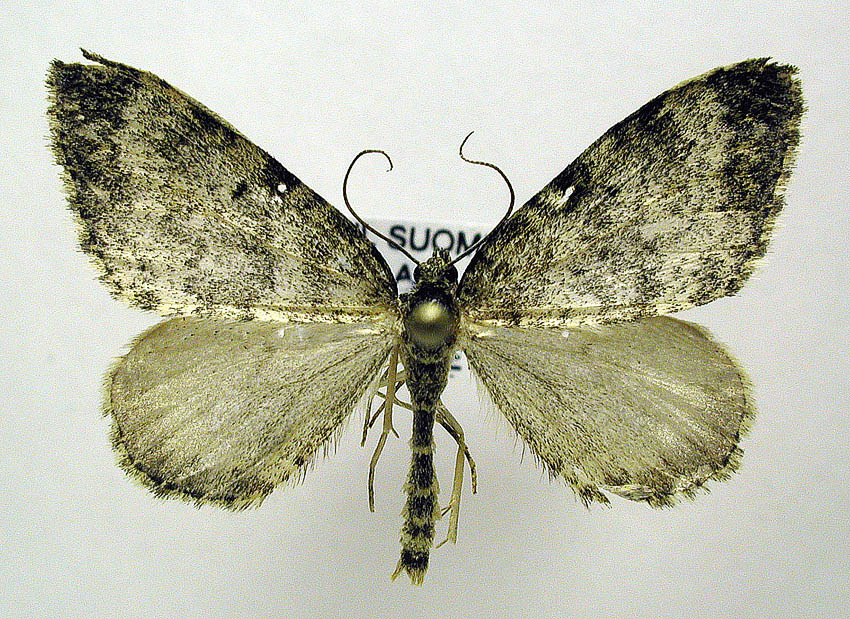

Scientific classification
- Domain: Eukaryota
- Kingdom: Animalia
- Phylum: Arthropoda
- Class: Insecta
- Order: Lepidoptera
- Family: Geometridae
- Genus: Entephria
- Species: E. nobiliaria

Binomial name
- Entephria nobiliaria (Herrich-Schäffer, 1852)

Synonyms
- Larentia nobiliaria Herrich-Schaffer, 1852; Cidaria borearia Prout, 1914

= Entephria nobiliaria =

Species of moth

Entephria nobiliaria is a moth of the family Geometridae first described by Gottlieb August Wilhelm Herrich-Schäffer in 1852. It is found from Scandinavia to Siberia and in the mountainous areas of Europe.

The wingspan is 26–33 mm. Adults are on wing in July.

The larvae feed on Saxifraga species, including Saxifraga oppositifolia. The species overwinters in the larval stage.

== Subspecies ==
- Entephria nobiliaria nobiliaria
- Entephria nobiliaria borearia Prout, 1914
