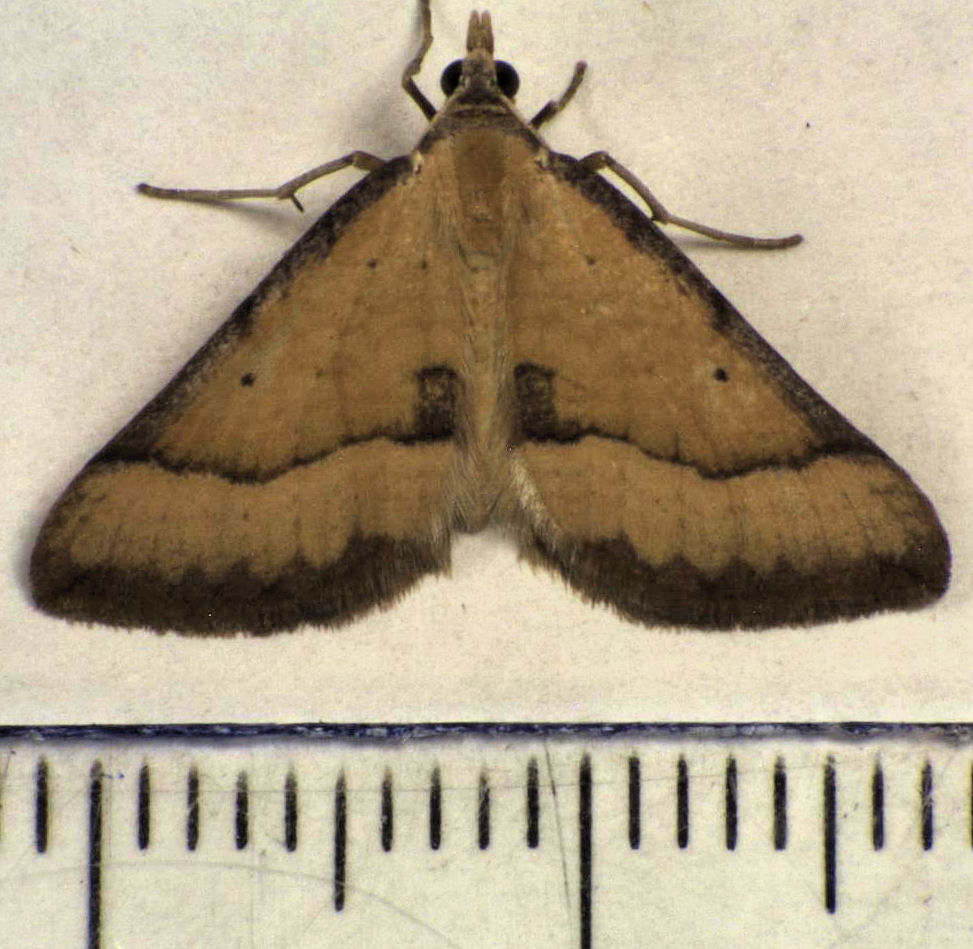
- Anachloris subochraria: type species of genus

Scientific classification
- Kingdom: Animalia
- Phylum: Arthropoda
- Clade: Pancrustacea
- Class: Insecta
- Order: Lepidoptera
- Family: Geometridae
- Subfamily: Larentiinae
- Tribe: Hydriomenini
- Genus: Anachloris; Meyrick, 1885

Synonyms
- Arsinoe Meyrick, 1883

= Anachloris =

Genus of geometer moths

Anachloris is a genus of moths in the family Geometridae, with three species, found in Australia, New Zealand and Papua New Guinea.

== Species ==
- Anachloris subochraria (Doubleday, 1843) [Australia, New Zealand and (probably) Papua New Guinea]
- Anachloris tofocolorata Schmidt, 2001 [Australia]
- Anachloris uncinata (Guenée, 1857) [Australia]
