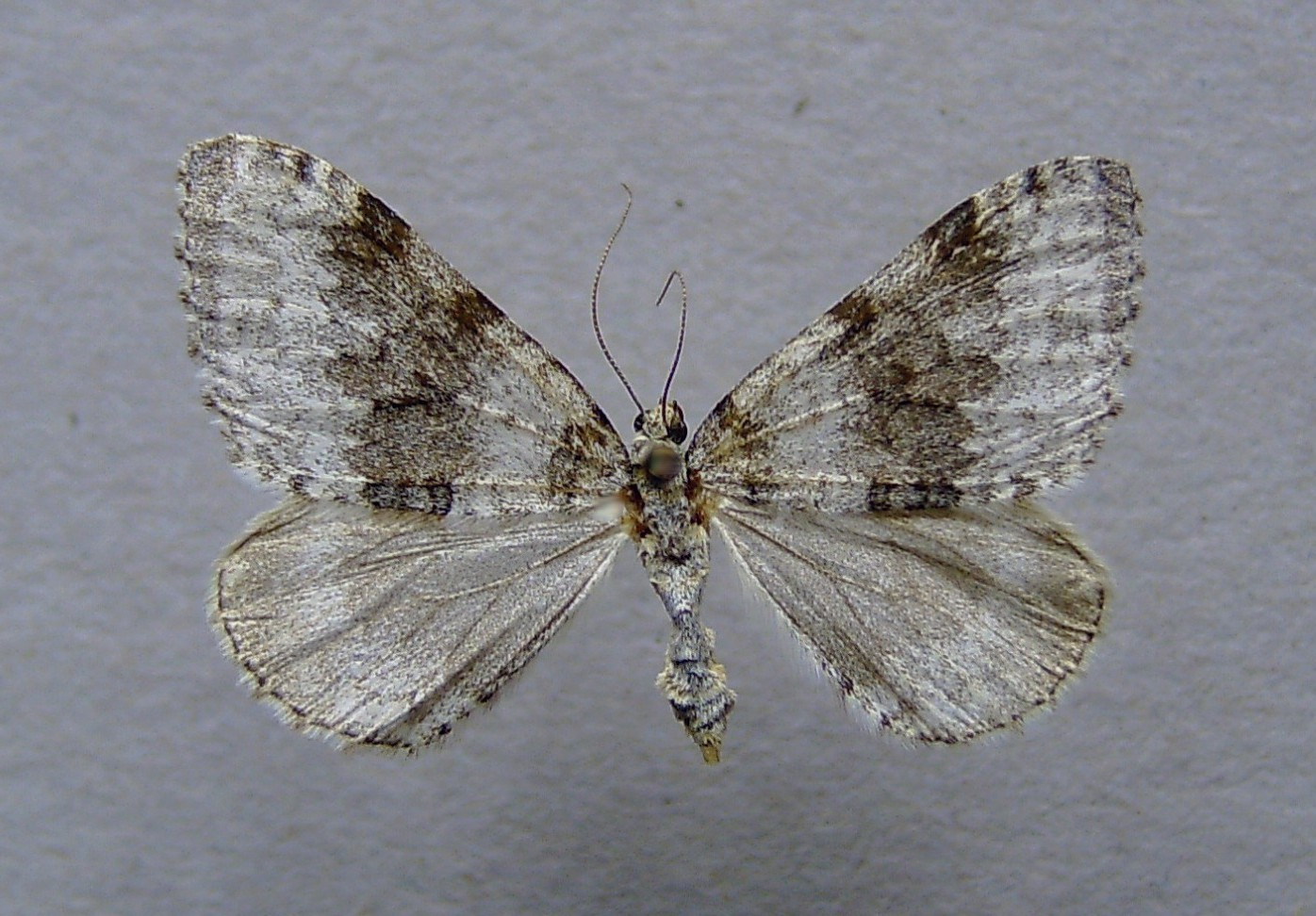

Scientific classification
- Domain: Eukaryota
- Kingdom: Animalia
- Phylum: Arthropoda
- Class: Insecta
- Order: Lepidoptera
- Family: Geometridae
- Genus: Entephria
- Species: E. cyanata

Binomial name
- Entephria cyanata (Hübner, 1809)

Synonyms
- Geometra cyanata Hübner, 1809; Entephria altivolans (Wehrli, 1926); Cidaria altivolans Wehrli, 1926

= Entephria cyanata =

Species of moth

Entephria cyanata is a moth of the family Geometridae. It was described by Jacob Hübner in 1809. It is found in Europe, from the Netherlands, east to Poland and Belarus, south to the Balkans and Greece, west to Italy and Spain. It is also found in the Near East and North Africa.

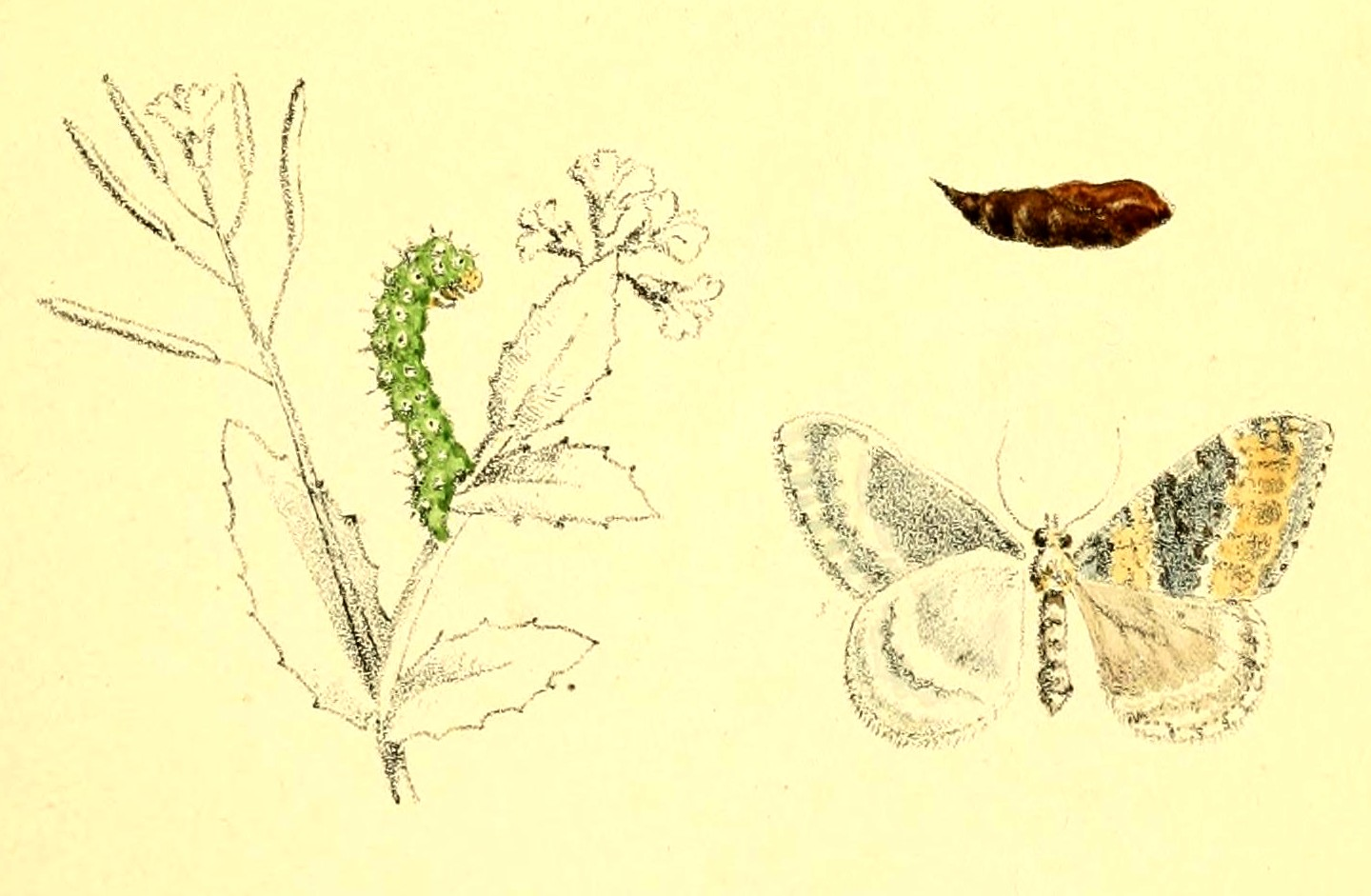
Illustration of adult, larva and pupa

The wingspan is 29–32 millimetres (1.1–1.3 in). Adults are on wing from June to August depending on the location.

== Subspecies ==
- Entephria cyanata cyanata
- Entephria cyanata petronensis
