= Hammaptera parinotata =

Scientific classification
- Kingdom: Animalia
- Phylum: Arthropoda
- Clade: Pancrustacea
- Class: Insecta
- Order: Lepidoptera
- Family: Geometridae
- Genus: Hammaptera
- Species: H. parinotata

Binomial name
- Hammaptera parinotata (Zeller, 1872)

Synonyms
- Ypsipetes anomala Butler, 1878

Species of moth

Hammaptera parinotata is a species of geometrid moth in the family Geometridae.

The MONA or Hodges number for Hammaptera parinotata is 7314.
