= Spargania aurata =

Scientific classification
- Kingdom: Animalia
- Phylum: Arthropoda
- Class: Insecta
- Order: Lepidoptera
- Family: Geometridae
- Genus: Spargania
- Species: S. aurata

Binomial name
- Spargania aurata (Grote, 1882)

Species of moth

Spargania aurata is a species of geometrid moth in the family Geometridae. It is found in Central America and North America.

The MONA or Hodges number for Spargania aurata is 7310.
