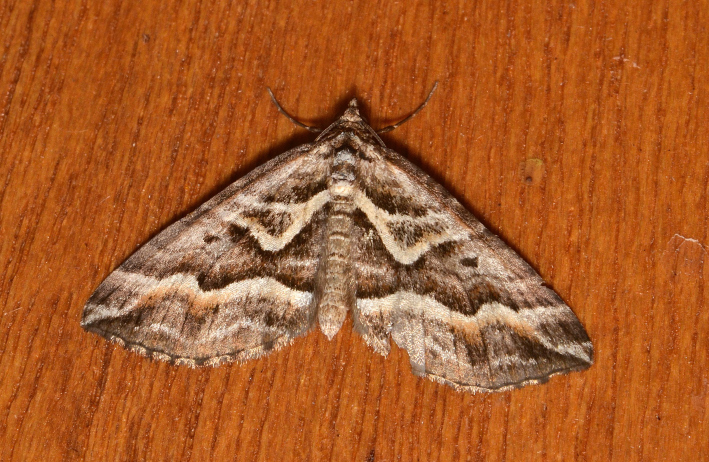
- Melitulias graphicata

Scientific classification
- Kingdom: Animalia
- Phylum: Arthropoda
- Class: Insecta
- Order: Lepidoptera
- Family: Geometridae
- Tribe: Hydriomenini
- Genus: Melitulias; Meyrick, 1891

= Melitulias =

Genus of moths

Melitulias is a genus of moths in the family Geometridae described by Edward Meyrick in 1891. All are found in Australia.

== Species ==
- Melitulias graphicata (Walker, 1861)
- Melitulias leucographa Turner, 1922
- Melitulias oriadelpha Turner, 1926
- Melitulias glandulata (Guenée, 1857)
- Melitulias discophora Meyrick, 1891
