= Ersephila grandipennis =

Scientific classification
- Kingdom: Animalia
- Phylum: Arthropoda
- Class: Insecta
- Order: Lepidoptera
- Family: Geometridae
- Genus: Ersephila
- Species: E. grandipennis

Binomial name
- Ersephila grandipennis Hulst, 1896

Species of moth

Ersephila grandipennis is a species of geometrid moth in the family Geometridae. It is found in North America.

The MONA or Hodges number for Ersephila grandipennis is 7280.
