= Grossbeckia =

Scientific classification
- Kingdom: Animalia
- Phylum: Arthropoda
- Class: Insecta
- Order: Lepidoptera
- Family: Geometridae
- Tribe: Hydriomenini
- Genus: Grossbeckia; Barnes & McDunnough, 1912

Genus of moths

Grossbeckia is a genus of moths in the family Geometridae. The genus was erected by William Barnes and James Halliday McDunnough in 1912.

== Species ==
- Grossbeckia gymnopomparia Dyar, 1913
- Grossbeckia semimaculata Barnes & McDunnough, 1912
- Grossbeckia ochriplaga Warren, 1905
