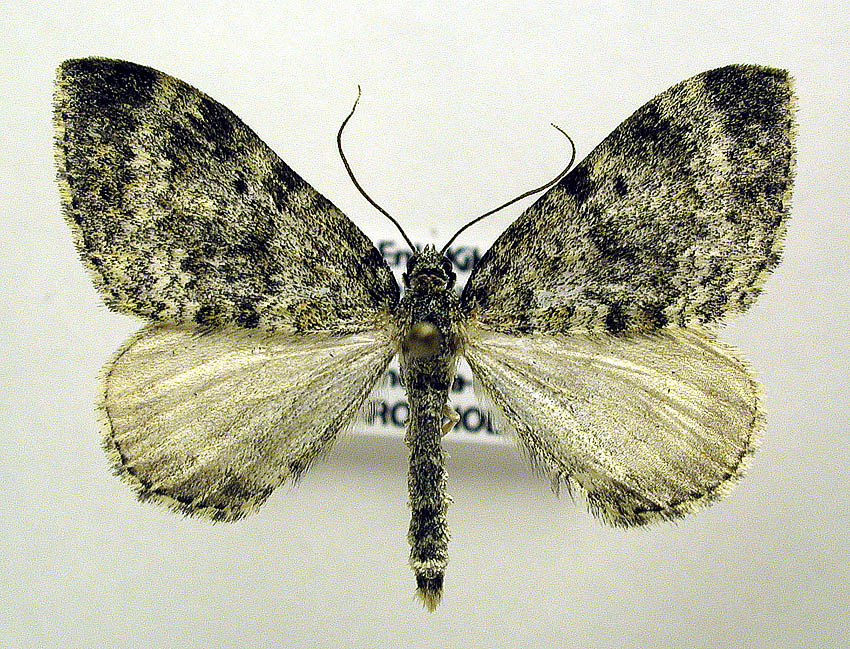

Scientific classification
- Kingdom: Animalia
- Phylum: Arthropoda
- Clade: Pancrustacea
- Class: Insecta
- Order: Lepidoptera
- Family: Geometridae
- Genus: Entephria
- Species: E. flavicinctata

Binomial name
- Entephria flavicinctata (Hübner, 1813)

Synonyms
- Geometra flavicinctata Hubner, 1813; Cidaria corsaria Schawerda, 1928; Larentia ruficinctata Guenee, 1858; Larentia septentrionalis Warnecke, 1934; Cidaria veletaria Wehrli, 1926

= Entephria flavicinctata =

Species of moth

Entephria flavicinctata, the yellow-ringed carpet, is a moth of the family Geometridae. The species was first described by Jacob Hübner in 1813. It is found in the mountainous areas of the Palearctic realm The distribution is disjunct extending across the Pyrenees, the Alps, some lower mountains (Vosges, Iceland, British Isles) and then from Norway across the Arctic to northern Russia.

The wingspan is 27–39 mm. The ground colour is pale grey. The basal, central and outer marginal cross lines are suffused with yellow. The hindwings are pale white. See also Prout.

The larva is pinkish brown, the body with powerful, protruding brushes. On the dorsum it has pink, triangular spots that are edged with dark brown. It resembles that of Entephria caesiata but is rather more stumpy, tapering anteriorly, and the dorsal triangles are smaller.

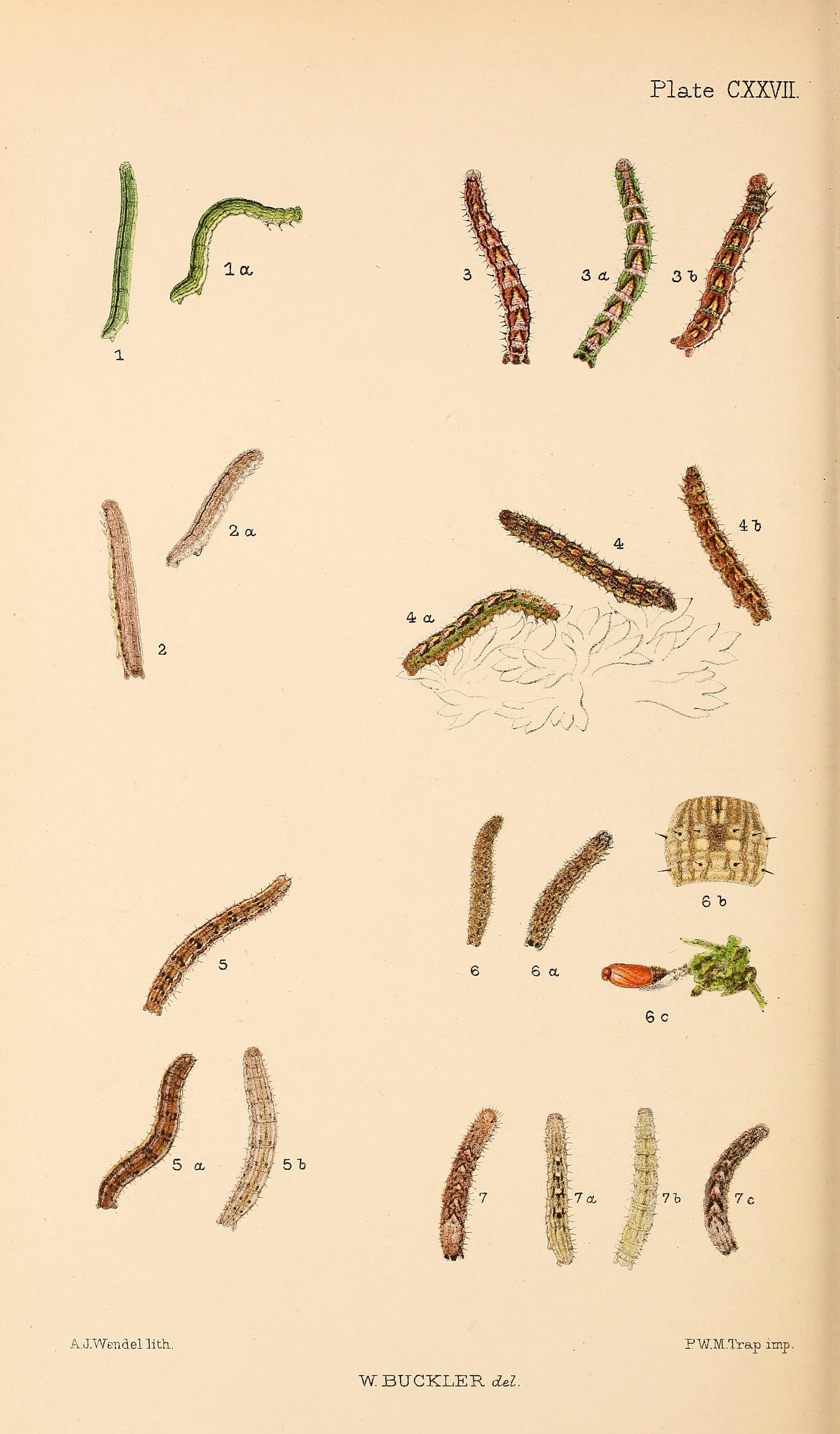
4,4a,4b larvae after final moult

Adults are on wing from June to August and sometimes also in May.

The larvae feed on Saxifraga and Sedum species. The species probably overwinters in the larval stage.

== Subspecies ==
- Entephria flavicinctata flavicinctata (Europe)
- Entephria flavicinctata corsaria Schawerda, 1928
- Entephria flavicinctata elbrusensis Tikhonov, 1994 (northern Caucasus, Dagestan)
- Entephria flavicinctata ruficinctata Guenee, 1858
- Entephria flavicinctata septentrionalis Warnecke, 1934 (Fennoscandia)
- Entephria flavicinctata veletaria Wehrli, 1926
