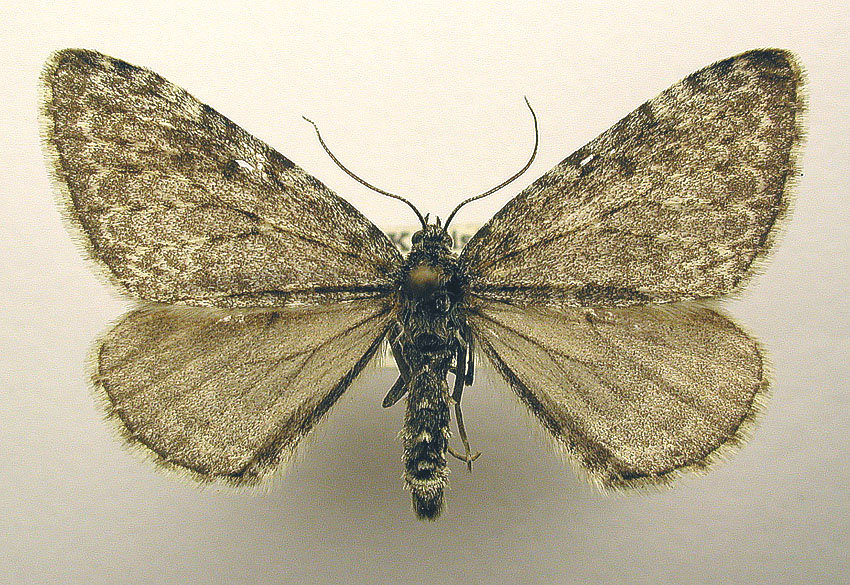

Scientific classification
- Kingdom: Animalia
- Phylum: Arthropoda
- Class: Insecta
- Order: Lepidoptera
- Family: Geometridae
- Genus: Entephria
- Species: E. punctipes

Binomial name
- Entephria punctipes (Curtis, 1835)

Synonyms
- Entephria polata punctipes; Oporabia punctipes Curtis 1835; Cidaria byssata Aurivillius 1891; Entephria byssata (Aurivillius, 1891)

= Entephria punctipes =

Species of moth

Entephria punctipes is a moth of the family Geometridae first described by John Curtis in 1835. It is found in the extreme north of the Palearctic and Nearctic realms.

The wingspan is 24–30 millimetres (0.94–1.18 in). Adults are on wing from June to July.

The larval food plants are unknown.
