= Anomocentris =

Scientific classification
- Kingdom: Animalia
- Phylum: Arthropoda
- Class: Insecta
- Order: Lepidoptera
- Family: Geometridae
- Tribe: Hydriomenini
- Genus: Anomocentris; Meyrick, 1891

Genus of geometer moths

Anomocentris is a genus of moths in the family Geometridae.

== Species ==
- Anomocentris capnoxutha Turner, 1939
- Anomocentris cosmadelpha (Lower, 1901)
- Anomocentris crystallota Meyrick, 1891
- Anomocentris trissodesma (Lower, 1897)
