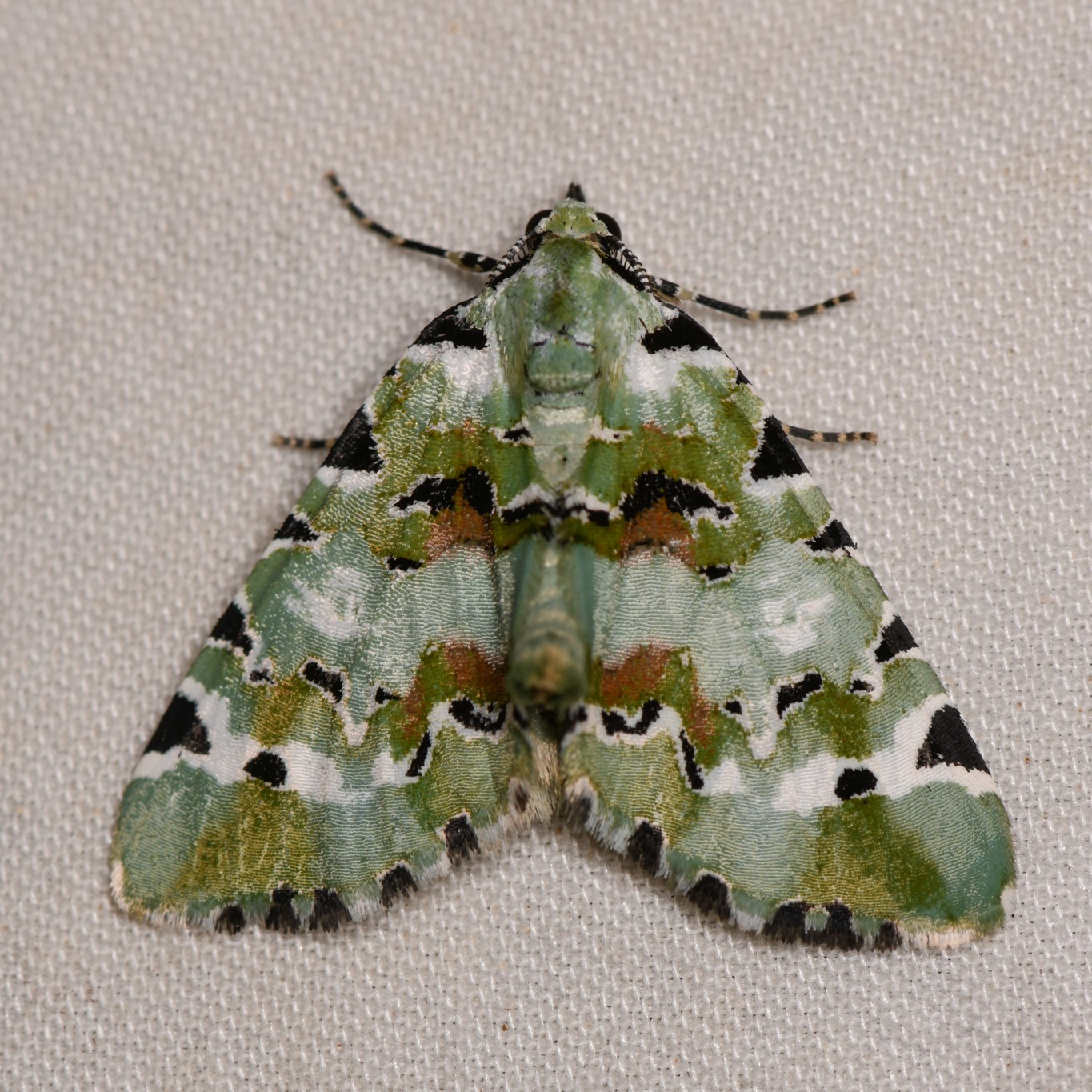
- Ersephila electa

Scientific classification
- Kingdom: Animalia
- Phylum: Arthropoda
- Class: Insecta
- Order: Lepidoptera
- Family: Geometridae
- Tribe: Hydriomenini
- Genus: Ersephila; Hulst, 1896

= Ersephila =

Genus of moths

Ersephila is a genus of moths in the family Geometridae. It was erected by George Duryea Hulst in 1896.

== Species ==
- Ersephila grandipennis Hulst, 1896
- Ersephila indistincta Hulst, 1898
