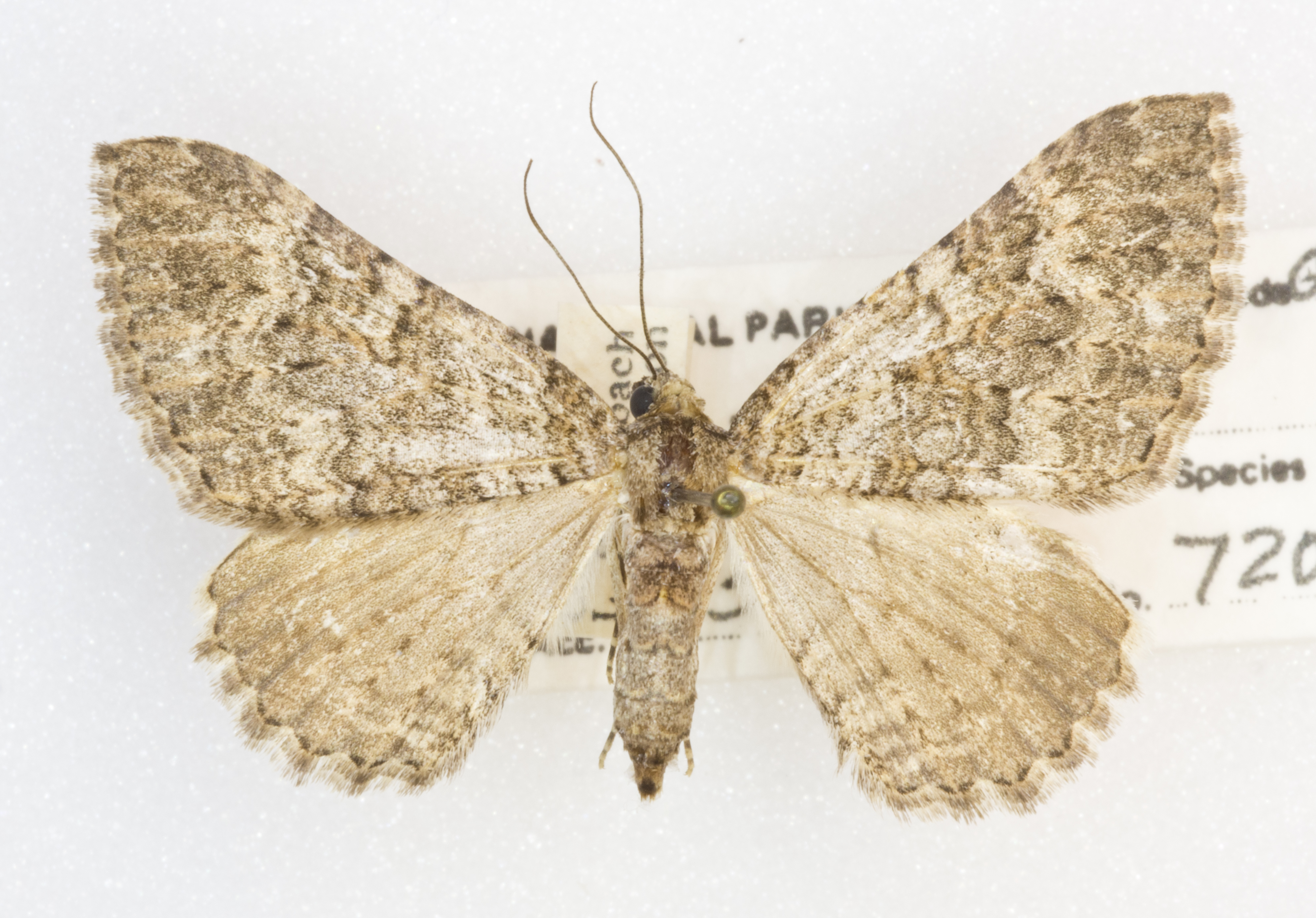

Scientific classification
- Kingdom: Animalia
- Phylum: Arthropoda
- Class: Insecta
- Order: Lepidoptera
- Family: Geometridae
- Genus: Archirhoe
- Species: A. neomexicana

Binomial name
- Archirhoe neomexicana (Hulst, 1896)

= Archirhoe neomexicana =

Species of moth

Archirhoe neomexicana is a species of geometrid moth in the family Geometridae. It is found in Central America and North America.
