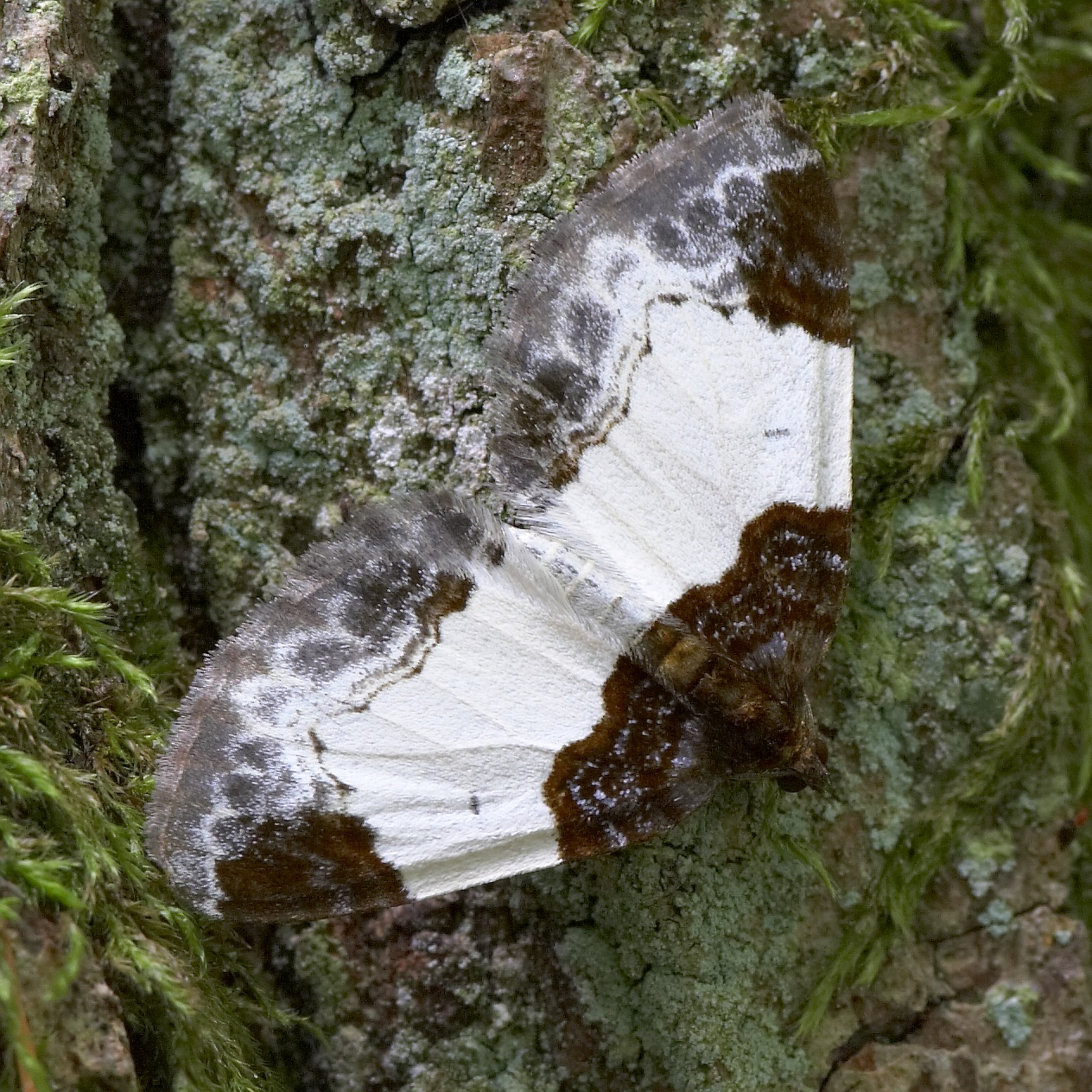

Scientific classification
- Kingdom: Animalia
- Phylum: Arthropoda
- Class: Insecta
- Order: Lepidoptera
- Family: Geometridae
- Genus: Mesoleuca
- Species: M. albicillata

Binomial name
- Mesoleuca albicillata (Linnaeus, 1758)

= Mesoleuca albicillata =

Species of moth

Mesoleuca albicillata, also known as the beautiful carpet, is a moth of the family Geometridae. It is found in the Palearctic.

== Distribution ==
Mesoleuca albicillata is commonly found throughout certain regions of Europe, from Spain through to Western and Central Europe, including the British Isles. In Northern Europe it is found as high up as Central Fennoscandia, and as low as Southern Italy, the Balkans and the Black Sea in Southern and Eastern Europe. It is also found in the temperate zone in Central Asia.

== Description ==
The wingspan is 34–38 mm. The ground colour of the forewings is creamy white to bright white. The basal field is markedly black-brown in colour. There is a large black-brown on the front edge behind the middle and almost to the apex. There is a double crossline of dark grey colour and a white wavy line in the grey marginal field with very small black discal flecks also present. The hindwings are white, have a grey marginal field that is crossed by a faint whitish squiggle and there is a thin, dark cross line and a small black middle spot. Adult caterpillars are strongly coloured green. On the dorsum they show very distinctive yellow-brown to red-brown arrow spots.

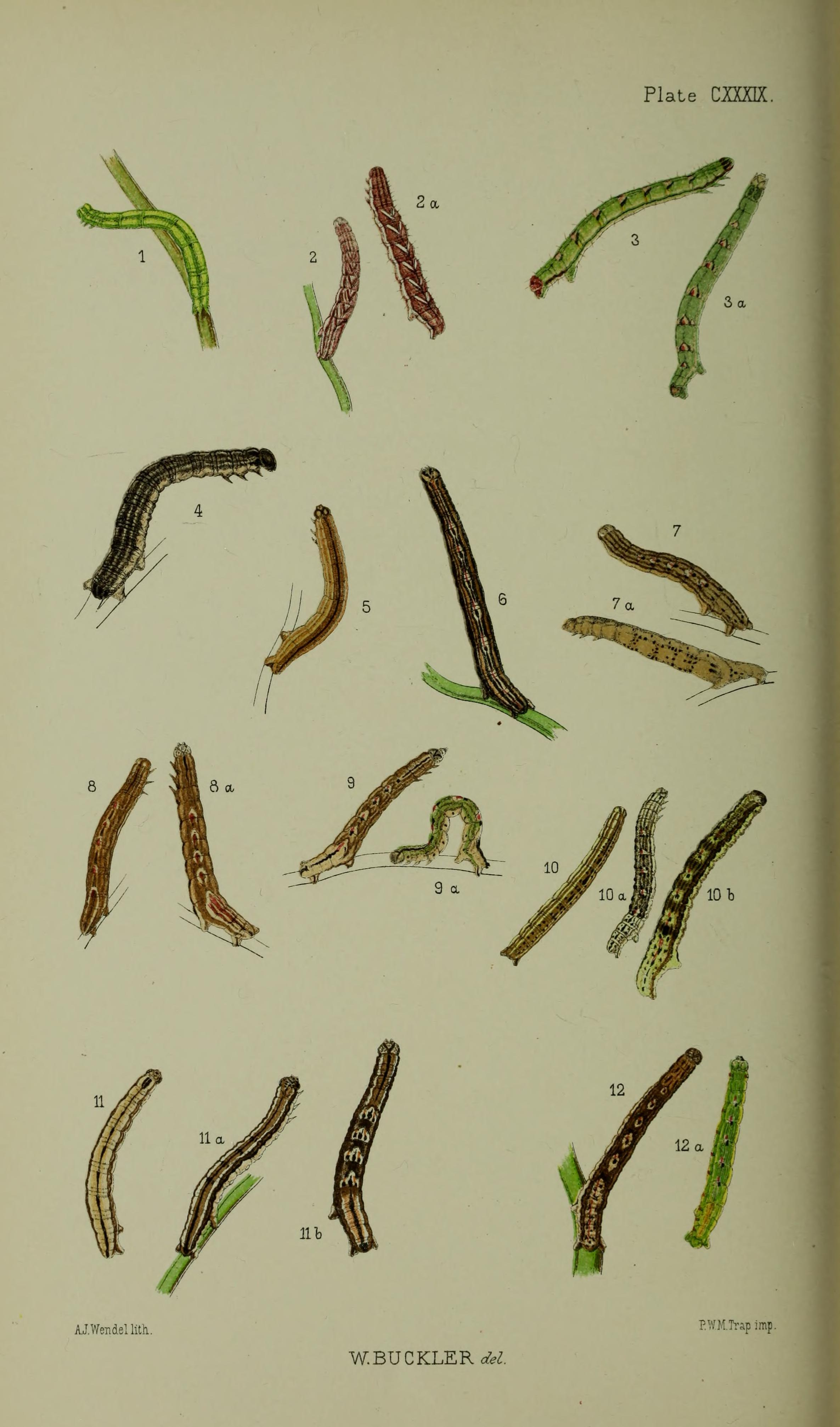
Fig.3, 3a larvae after final moult

== Biology ==
The moth is single brooded and flies from mid May to mid August.

The larva feeds on bramble, raspberry and strawberry and in the UK can be found from July to September.

The species inhabits open forests, forest edges, wetlands, shore areas as well as gardens and parks.

== Similar species ==
- Catarhoe cuculata with a wingspan of 22 to 27 millimeters is significantly smaller and also shows reddish-brown marks in the basal and marginal fields. In Melanthia procellata the dark basal field is smaller, the costal edge shows a narrow stripe and the large dark discal spot is extended further than in albicillata.

== Notes ==
1. The flight season refers to Belgium and The Netherlands. This may vary in other parts of the range.
