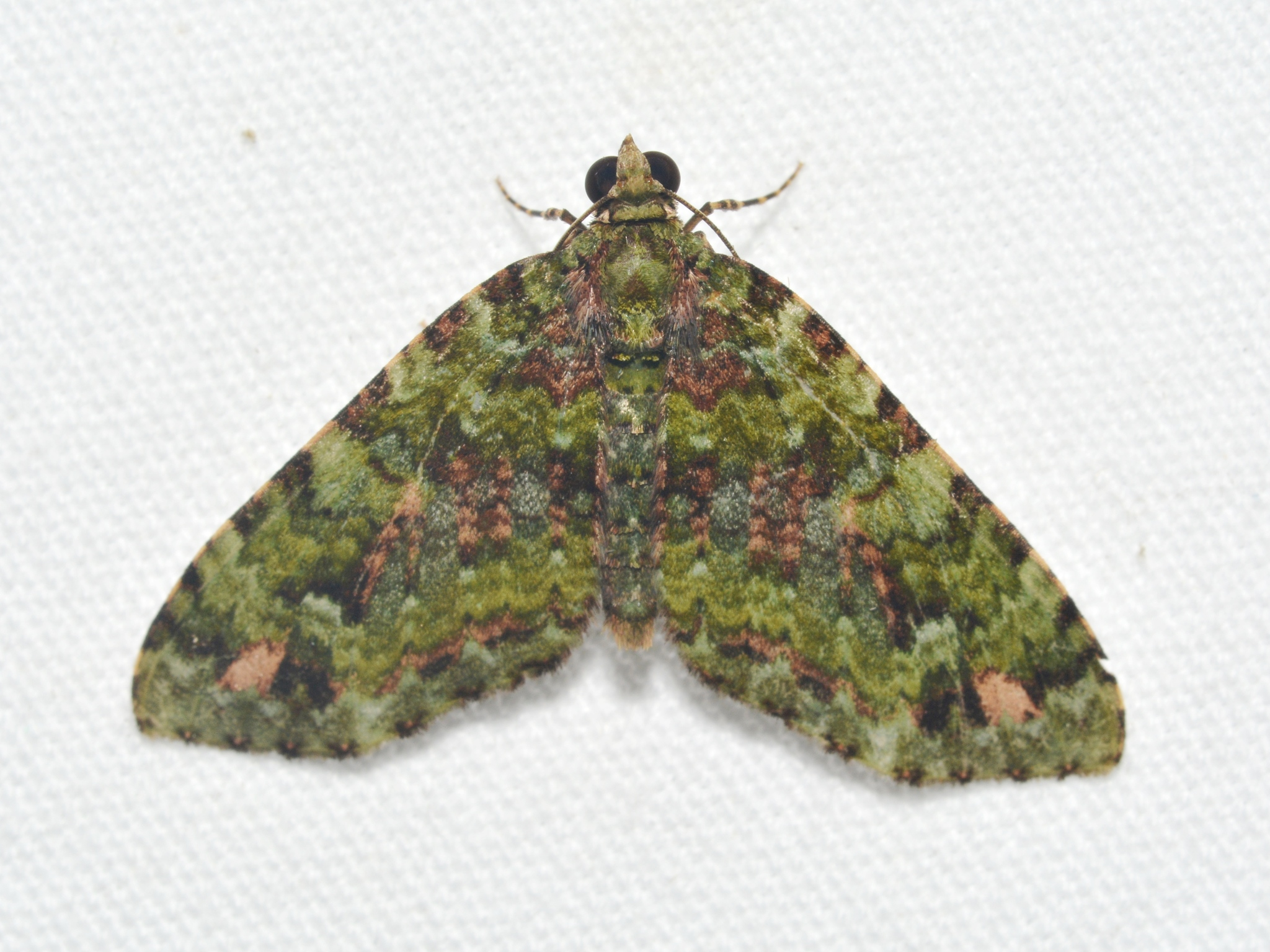
- Hammaptera probataria

Scientific classification
- Kingdom: Animalia
- Phylum: Arthropoda
- Clade: Pancrustacea
- Class: Insecta
- Order: Lepidoptera
- Family: Geometridae
- Tribe: Hydriomenini
- Genus: Hammaptera; Herrich-Schäffer, 1855

Synonyms
- Rhopalista Warren, 1897

= Hammaptera =

Genus of moths

Hammaptera is a genus of moths in the family Geometridae erected by Gottlieb August Wilhelm Herrich-Schäffer in 1855.

== Species ==
- Hammaptera caribbea Schaus, 1912
- Hammaptera coras Druce, 1893
- Hammaptera dominans Schaus, 1913
- Hammaptera frondosata Guenée, [1858]
- Hammaptera fulvifusa Warren, 1897
- Hammaptera herbosaria Schaus, 1912
- Hammaptera hypochrysa Prout, 1916
- Hammaptera ignifera Thierry-Mieg, 1894
- Hammaptera improbaria Schaus, 1901
- Hammaptera infuscata Herbulot, 1988
- Hammaptera parinotata Zeller, 1872
- Hammaptera postluteata Thierry-Mieg, 1907
- Hammaptera praderia Dognin, 1893
- Hammaptera probataria Herrich-Schäffer, 1855
- Hammaptera repandaria Schaus, 1901
- Hammaptera requisitata Warren, 1900
- Hammaptera rosenbergi Warren, 1900
- Hammaptera sabrosa Dognin, 1893
- Hammaptera semiflava Dognin, 1913
- Hammaptera semiobliterata Warren, 1895
- Hammaptera trochilarioides Dognin, 1901
- Hammaptera undulosa Warren, 1900
- Hammaptera vanonaria Schaus, 1901
- Hammaptera viridifusata Walker, 1862
