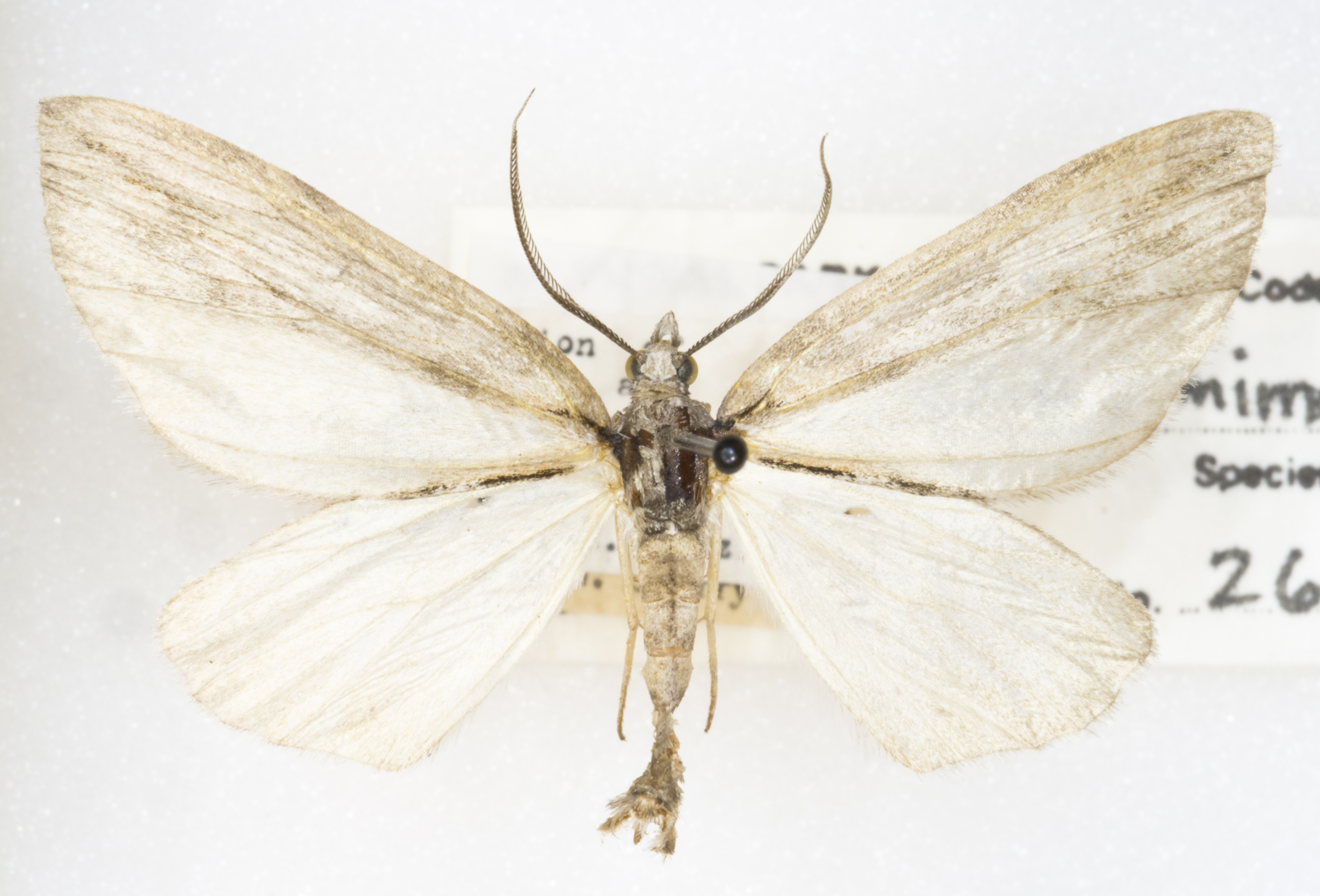

Scientific classification
- Kingdom: Animalia
- Phylum: Arthropoda
- Class: Insecta
- Order: Lepidoptera
- Family: Geometridae
- Genus: Grossbeckia
- Species: G. semimaculata

Binomial name
- Grossbeckia semimaculata Barnes & McDunnough, 1912

= Grossbeckia semimaculata =

Species of moth

Grossbeckia semimaculata is a species of moth in the family Geometridae first described by William Barnes and James Halliday McDunnough in 1912. It is found in North America.

The MONA or Hodges number for Grossbeckia semimaculata is 7283.
