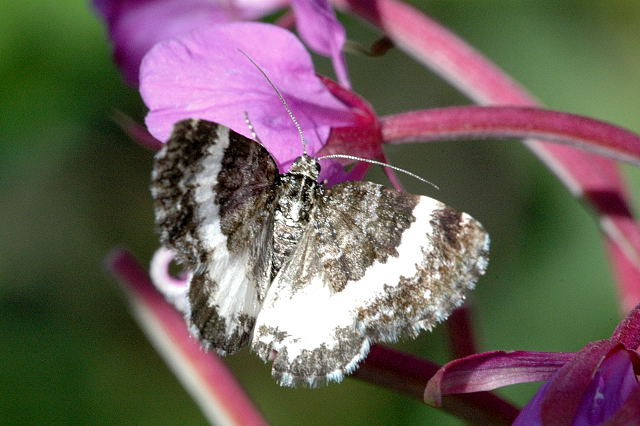

Scientific classification
- Domain: Eukaryota
- Kingdom: Animalia
- Phylum: Arthropoda
- Class: Insecta
- Order: Lepidoptera
- Family: Geometridae
- Genus: Spargania
- Species: S. luctuata

Binomial name
- Spargania luctuata (Denis & Schiffermüller, 1775)

= Spargania luctuata =

Species of moth

Spargania luctuata, the white-banded carpet, is a moth of the family Geometridae. The species was first described by Michael Denis and Ignaz Schiffermüller in 1775. It is found throughout northern and central Europe, North Asia and North America.

The wingspan is 30–34 mm. The length of the forewings is 14–15 mm. The moth flies in two generations from the end of April to September.

The caterpillars feed on various species of rosebay willowherb.

== Notes ==
1. The flight season refers to Belgium and the Netherlands. This may vary in other parts of the range.
