= Eutrepsia =

Scientific classification
- Kingdom: Animalia
- Phylum: Arthropoda
- Class: Insecta
- Order: Lepidoptera
- Family: Geometridae
- Tribe: Hydriomenini
- Genus: Eutrepsia; Herrich-Schäffer, [1855]

Synonyms
- Oenotrus H. Druce, 1885

Genus of moths

Eutrepsia is a genus of moths in the family Geometridae first described by Gottlieb August Wilhelm Herrich-Schäffer in 1855.

== Species ==
- Eutrepsia inconstans (Geyer, 1837) Mexico
- Eutrepsia lithosiata (Guenée, 1857) probably Brazil
- Eutrepsia dispar (Walker, 1854) Mexico, Honduras, Guatemala, Nicaragua
- Eutrepsia striatus (H. Druce, 1885) Guatemala
- Eutrepsia secreta (Walker, [1865]) Mexico, Guatemala
- Eutrepsia pacilius (H. Druce, 1885) Guatemala
- Eutrepsia primulina (Butler & H. Druce, 1872) Costa Rica
- Eutrepsia mercedes Beutelspacher-Baigts, 1984) Mexico
