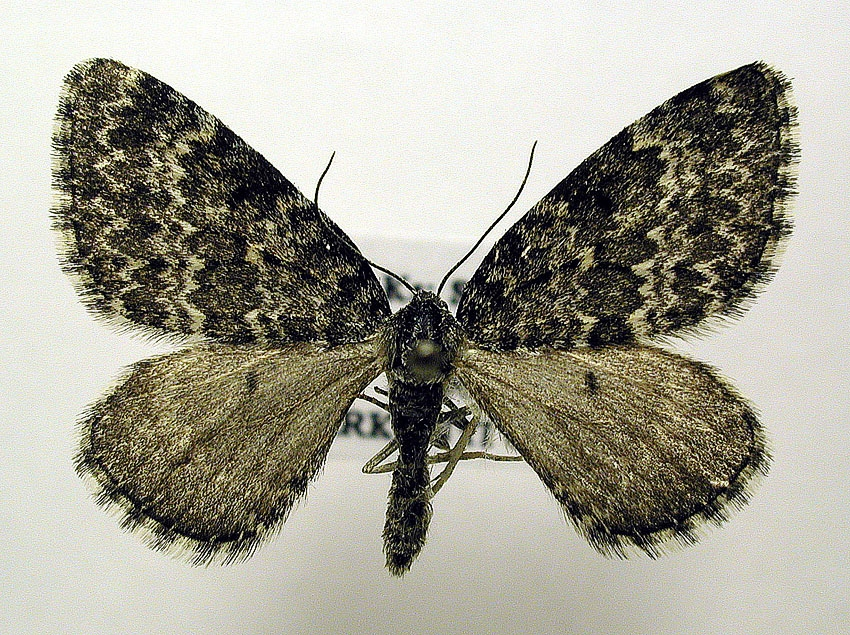

Scientific classification
- Kingdom: Animalia
- Phylum: Arthropoda
- Class: Insecta
- Order: Lepidoptera
- Family: Geometridae
- Genus: Entephria
- Species: E. polata

Binomial name
- Entephria polata (Duponchel, 1830)

Synonyms
- Larentia polata Duponchel, 1830

= Entephria polata =

Species of moth

Entephria polata is a moth of the family Geometridae first described by Philogène Auguste Joseph Duponchel in 1830. It is found from Fennoscandia to north-eastern Siberia. It is also present in northern North America.

The wingspan is 23–32 millimetres (0.91–1.26 in). Adults are on wing in July.

The larval food plants were unknown for a long time. But Itämies and Várkonyi reported (in 1997) the larvae on Empetrum nigrum ssp. hermaphroditum. The larvae were observed to live on the buds of the plant in early summer. Several pupa of this species have been found in a web under rocks.

== Subspecies ==
- Entephria polata polata
- Entephria polata transsibirica Vasilenko, 1990
- Entephria polata brullei (Lefebvre, 1836)
- Entephria polata bradorata (Munroe, 1951)
- Entephria polata ursata (Munroe, 1951)
- Entephria polata kidluitata (Munroe, 1951)
- Entephria polata eleutiata (Munroe, 1951)
