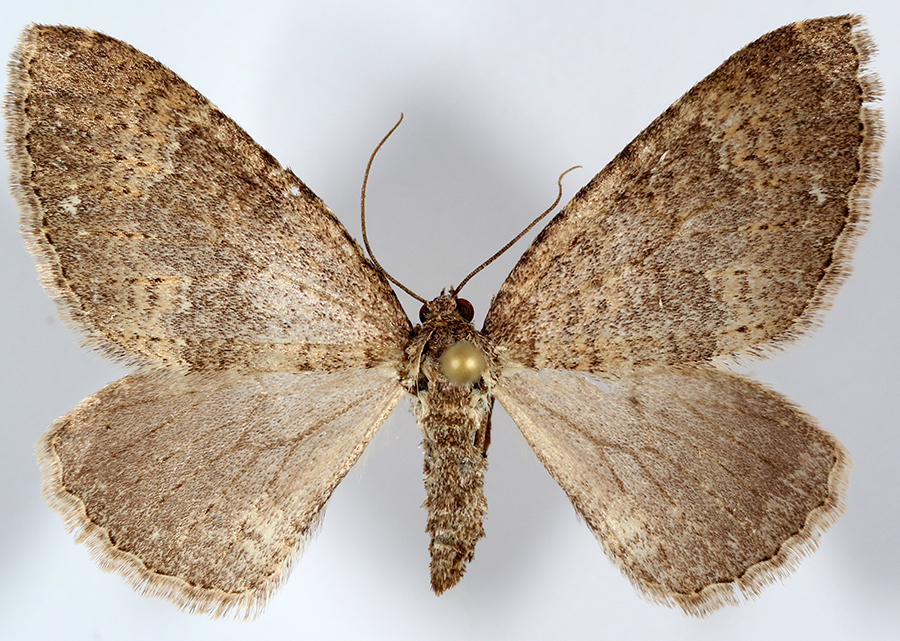
- Monostoecha semipectinata

Scientific classification
- Kingdom: Animalia
- Phylum: Arthropoda
- Class: Insecta
- Order: Lepidoptera
- Family: Geometridae
- Genus: Monostoecha; Fletcher, 1979
- Species: M. semipectinata

Binomial name
- Monostoecha semipectinata Hulst, 1898

Synonyms
- Monotaxis Hulst, 1898

= Monostoecha =

Genus of moths

Monostoecha is a monotypic moth genus in the family Geometridae described by David Stephen Fletcher in 1979. Its only species, Monostoecha semipectinata, first described by George Duryea Hulst in 1898, is found in the American Southwest.
