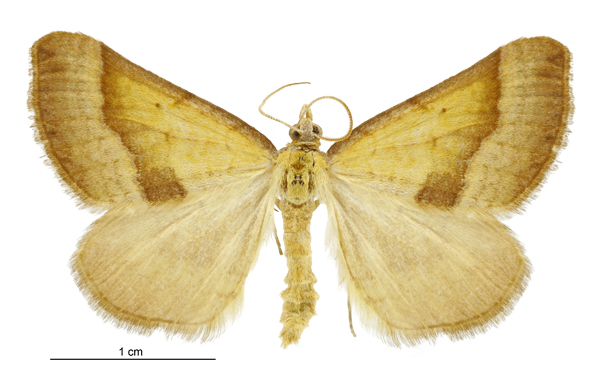
- Male specimen
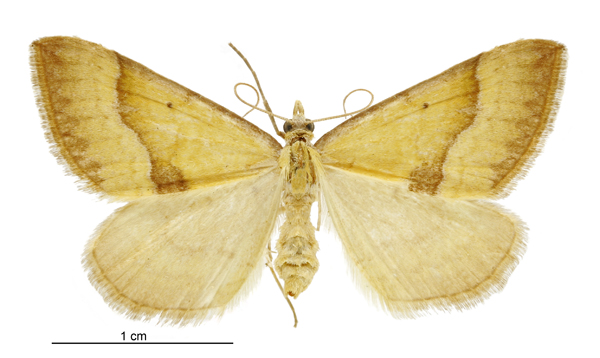
- Female specimen

Scientific classification
- Kingdom: Animalia
- Phylum: Arthropoda
- Clade: Pancrustacea
- Class: Insecta
- Order: Lepidoptera
- Family: Geometridae
- Genus: Anachloris
- Species: A. subochraria

Binomial name
- Anachloris subochraria (Doubleday, 1843)

Synonyms
- Aspilates subochraria Doubleday, 1843; Camptogramma strangulata Guenée, 1857; Aspilates euboliaria Walker, 1863; Camptogramma fuscinata Guenée, 1868; Hydriomena subochraria (Doubleday, 1843)

= Anachloris subochraria =

Species of moth

Anachloris subochraria (also known as Australian yellow or willowherb yellow) is a species of moth of the family Geometridae. It is found in New Zealand and the southern half of Australia including Tasmania and from Queensland across to Western Australia.

== Taxonomy ==
A. subochraria was first described by Edward Doubleday in 1843.

== Description ==
The wingspan is about 30 mm.

== Distribution ==
It is found in New Zealand and the southern half of Australia including Tasmania and from Queensland across to Western Australia.

== Hosts ==
The larvae feed on Hibbertia species. In New Zealand the larvae have been observed feeding on the naturalised weed, ragwort (Jacobaea vulgaris).

== Behaviour ==
This moth is day flying and can be found in New Zealand on the wing between November and April.
