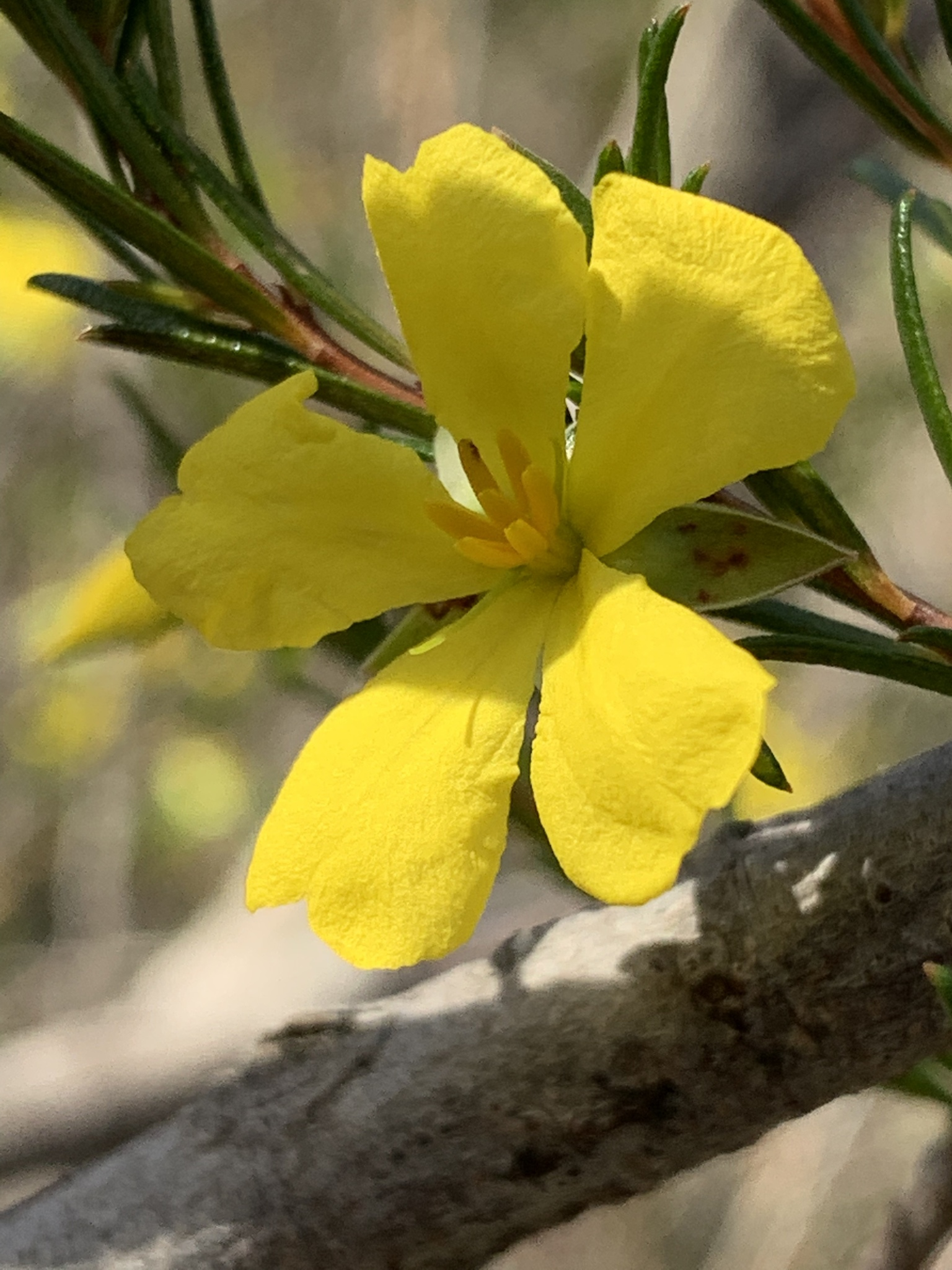

Scientific classification
- Kingdom: Plantae
- Clade: Embryophytes
- Clade: Tracheophytes
- Clade: Angiosperms
- Clade: Eudicots
- Order: Dilleniales
- Family: Dilleniaceae
- Genus: Hibbertia
- Species: H. stricta

Binomial name
- Hibbertia stricta (DC.) R.Br. ex F.Muell.

Synonyms
- Hibbertia stricta DC. nom. inval., pro syn.; Hibbertia stricta (DC.) R.Br. ex F.Muell. f. stricta; Hibbertia stricta (DC.) R.Br. ex F.Muell. var. stricta; Pleurandra microphylla Sieber ex Spreng.; Pleurandra riparia var. microphylla Hook.f.; Pleurandra riparia var. stricta (DC.) Hook.f.; Pleurandra striata G.Don orth. var.; Pleurandra stricta DC.; Pleurandra stricta Sieber ex Spreng. nom. illeg.

= Hibbertia stricta =

Species of plant

Hibbertia stricta is a species of flowering plant in the family Dilleniaceae and is endemic to New South Wales. It is a small, usually upright shrub with hairy foliage, linear leaves and yellow flowers with six or seven stamens arranged around two woolly-hairy carpels.

== Description ==
Hibbertia stricta is an upright shrub that typically grows to a height of 0.8–1.3 m (2 ft 7 in – 4 ft 3 in) and has hairy foliage and ridged branchlets. The leaves are linear, mostly 6–12 mm (0.24–0.47 in) long and 0.4–0.8 mm (0.016–0.031 in) wide on a petiole 0.2–1.1 mm (0.0079–0.0433 in) long. The flowers are arranged singly, mostly on the ends of short side-branches and are more or less sessile. The five sepals are narrowly egg-shaped, densely hairy on the outer surface, 4.5–7.0 mm (0.18–0.28 in) long and joined at the base, the two outer sepals slightly shorter than the other three. The petals are yellow, 4.0–6.5 mm (0.16–0.26 in) long and about 3 mm (0.12 in) wide with six or seven stamens arranged around two carpels, each with four ovules. Flowering occurs from September to February.

== Taxonomy ==
This species was first formally described in 1817 by Augustin Pyramus de Candolle in his Regni Vegetabilis Systema Naturale, and was given the name Pleurandra stricta from an unpublished description by Robert Brown of specimens Brown collected near Port Jackson. In 1862, Ferdinand von Mueller changed the name to Hibbertia stricta in his book, The Plants Indigenous to the Colony of Victoria. The specific epithet (stricta) means "upright" or "straight".

In 2012, Hellmut R. Toelken described H. stricta subsp. furculata and its name, and that of the autonym are accepted by the Australian Plant Census. Subspecies furcatula has longer hairs on the upper leaf surface and the edges of the rolled-under leaves do not reach the midvein.

== Distribution and habitat ==
Hibbertia stricta grows on sandy soil in low-lying areas between Sydney and Jervis Bay, but subspecies furculata is only known from two populations - one near Nowra and the other near Loftus.

== Conservation status ==
Subspecies furculata is listed as "endangered" under the New South Wales Government Biodiversity Conservation Act 2016.
