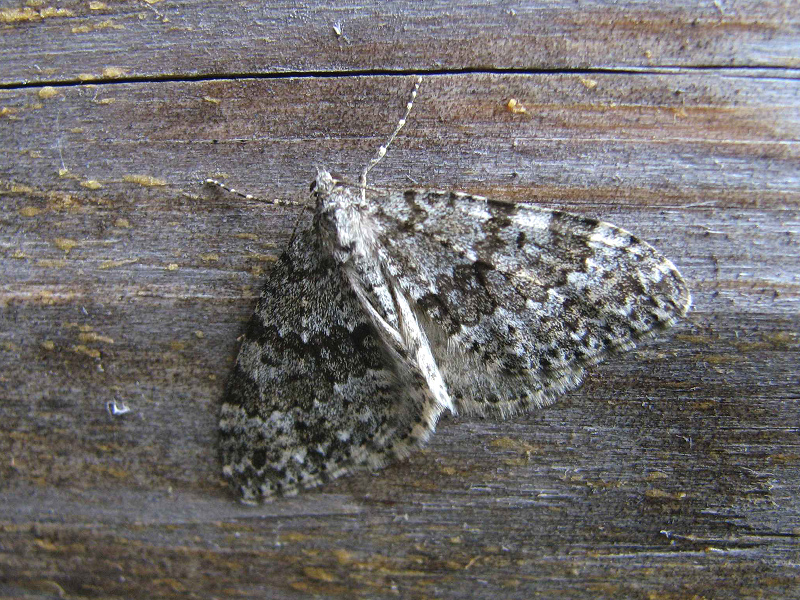

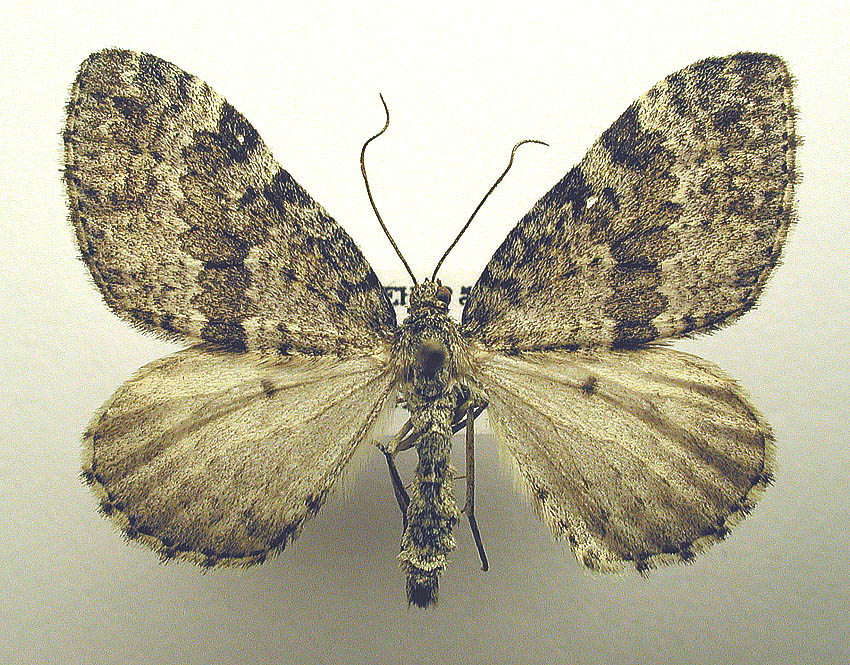

Scientific classification
- Kingdom: Animalia
- Phylum: Arthropoda
- Class: Insecta
- Order: Lepidoptera
- Family: Geometridae
- Genus: Entephria
- Species: E. caesiata

Binomial name
- Entephria caesiata (Denis & Schiffermüller, 1775)

= Entephria caesiata =

Species of moth

Entephria caesiata, the grey mountain carpet, is a moth of the family Geometridae. The species was first described by Michael Denis and Ignaz Schiffermüller in 1775. It is found in the mountainous areas of Europe (including Great Britain, Fennoscandia and the Alps), the Caucasus, Asia Minor, Armenia, Russia, Russian Far East, Siberia, northern Mongolia, Sakhalin and Honshū in Japan.

The wingspan is 32–41 millimetres (1.3–1.6 in). The forewing ground colour is ash grey to blue grey. There are several dark wavy bands. The basal area and the field between the two fasciae is also darker than the ground colour. There is a black discal spot. The fringes are grey chequered dark grey. The hindwing is pale grey with pale transverse lines and a grey-black discal spot. See also Prout.

The larva is pinkish brown on the back with yellowish-white, triangular spots, on the greenish sides.

Adults are on wing from July to September.

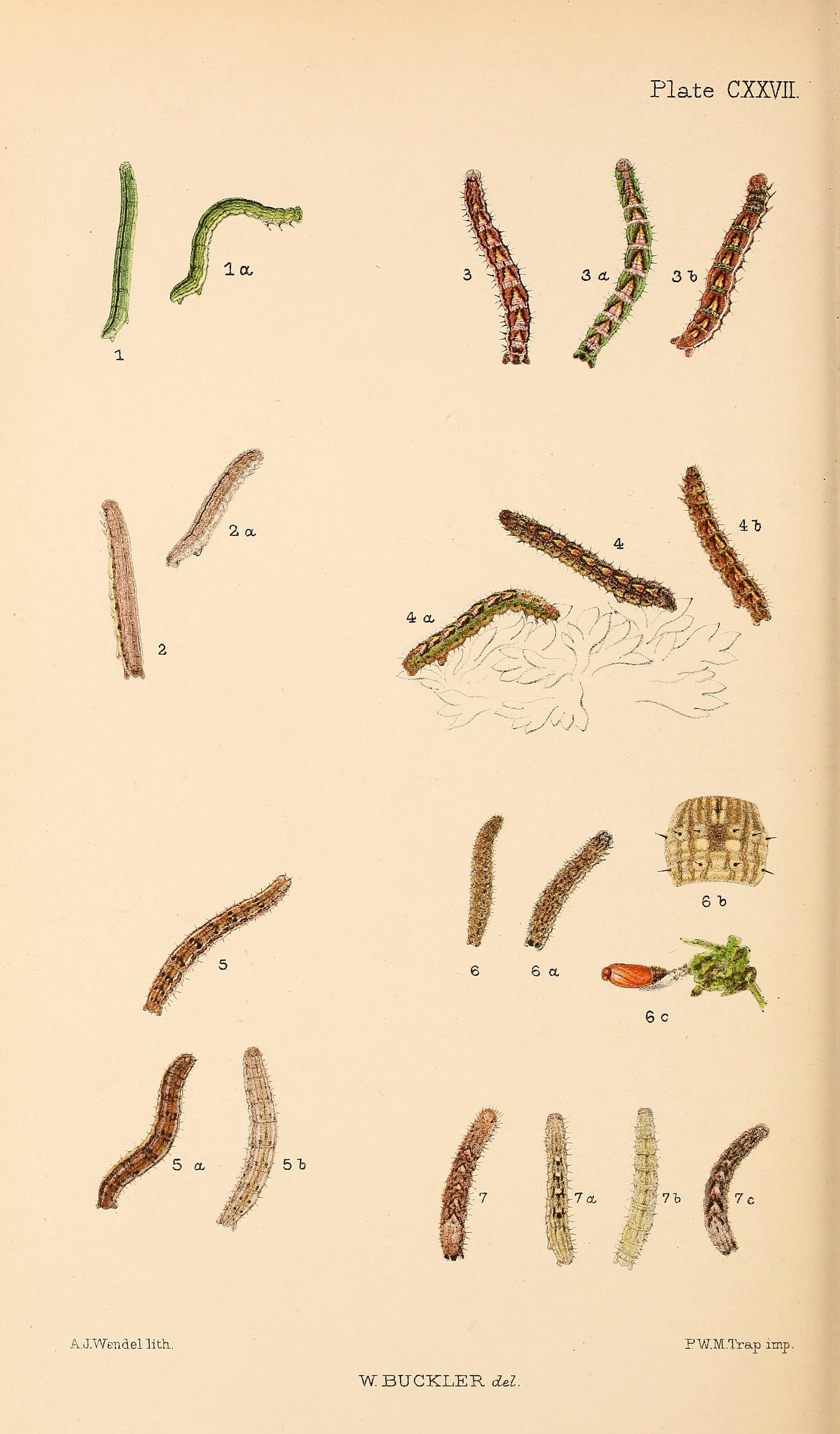
Figs.3,3a,3b larvae after final moult

The larvae feed on various low heathland plants, including Calluna and Vaccinium myrtillus. Other recorded food plants include Betula species (including Betula nana), Vaccinium uliginosum, Ledum palustre and Empetrum nigrum.
