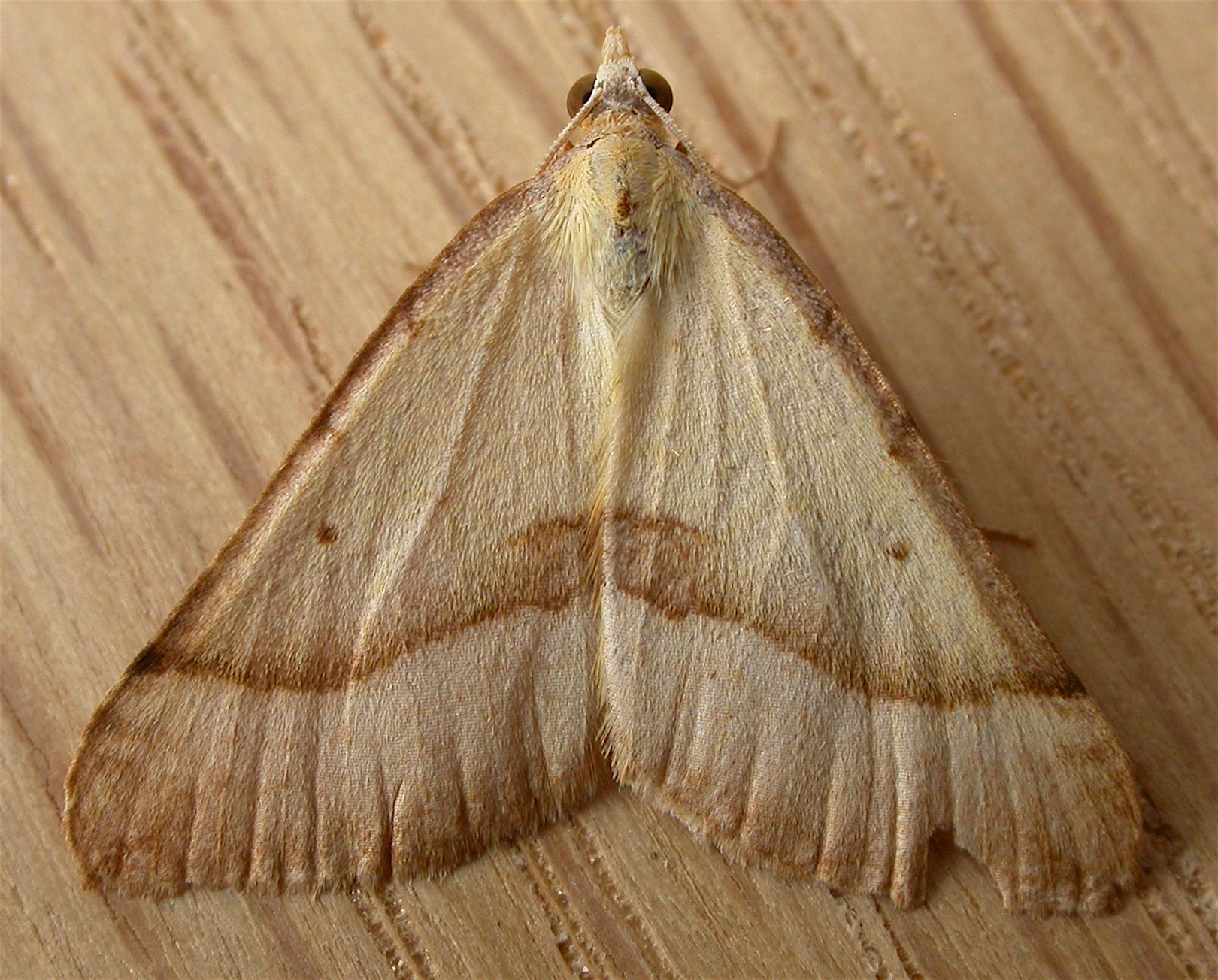
- Anachloris subochraria

Scientific classification
- Kingdom: Animalia
- Phylum: Arthropoda
- Class: Insecta
- Order: Lepidoptera
- Family: Geometridae
- Subfamily: Larentiinae
- Tribe: Hydriomenini; Meyrick, 1872

= Hydriomenini =

Tribe of moths

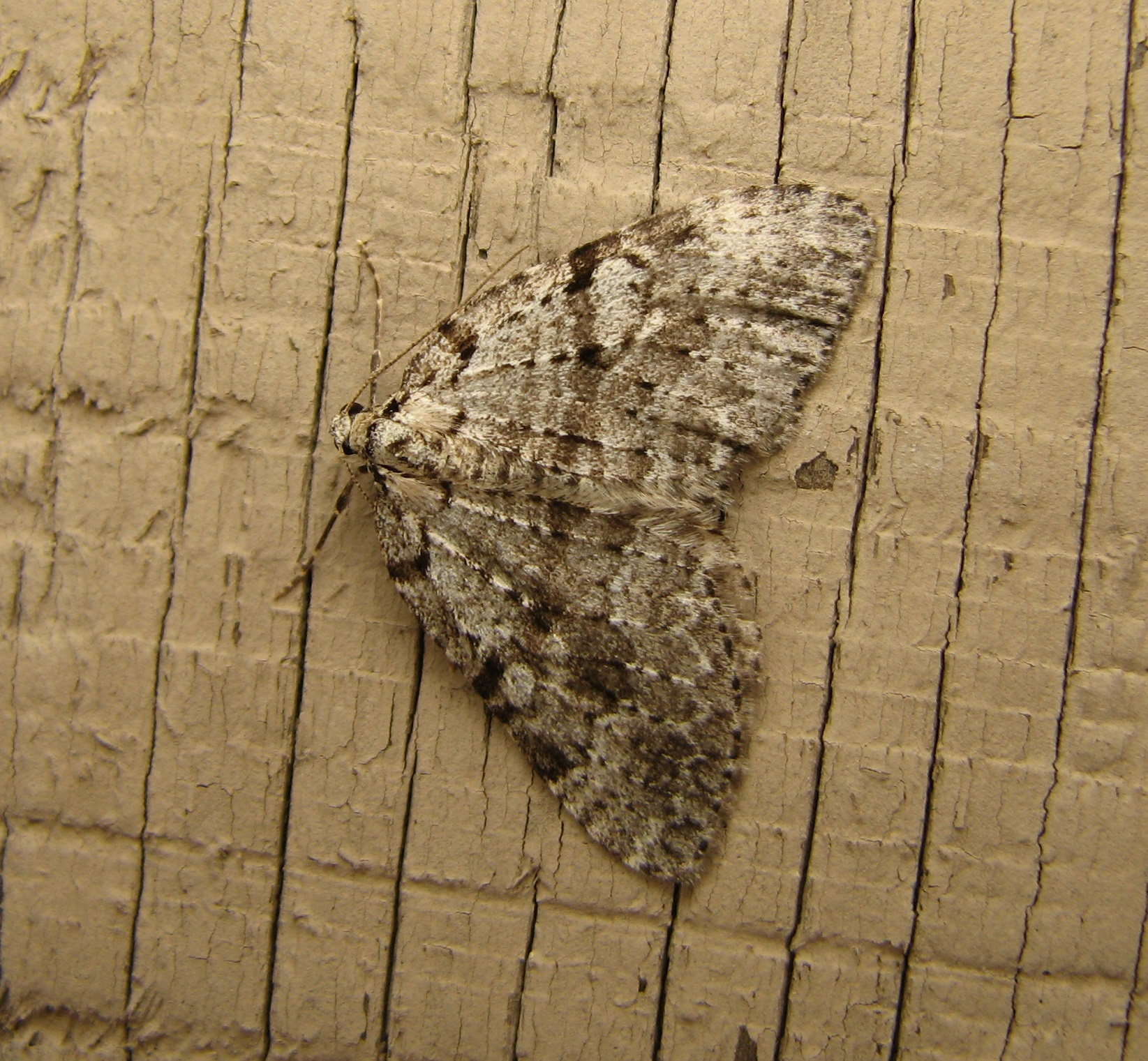
Perizoma curvilinea in Oregon

Hydriomenini is a tribe of geometer moths under subfamily Larentiinae. The tribe was erected by Edward Meyrick in 1872.

== Recognized genera ==
- Anachloris Meyrick, 1885
- Anomocentris Meyrick, 1891
- Aponotoreas Craw, 1986
- Carptima Pearsall, 1906
- Ceratodalia Packard, 1876
- Cyclica Grote, 1882
- Ersephila Hulst, 1896
- Eurhinosea Packard, 1873
- Eutrepsia Herrich-Schäffer, [1855]
- Grossbeckia Barnes & McDunnough, 1912
- Hammaptera Herrich-Schäffer, 1855
- Hydriomena Hübner, 1825
- Melitulias Meyrick, 1891
- Monostoecha Fletcher, 1979
- Notoreas Meyrick, 1885
