= Eupithecia sogai =

Scientific classification
- Domain: Eukaryota
- Kingdom: Animalia
- Phylum: Arthropoda
- Class: Insecta
- Order: Lepidoptera
- Family: Geometridae
- Genus: Eupithecia
- Species: E. sogai

Binomial name
- Eupithecia sogai Herbulot, 1970

Species of moth

Eupithecia sogai is a species of moth of the family Geometridae described by Claude Herbulot in 1970. It is found in North Madagascar.

It looks similar to Eupithecia personata, D. S. Fletcher, and the length of its front wings is 11.5 mm.
