= Scopula ourebi =

Scientific classification
- Domain: Eukaryota
- Kingdom: Animalia
- Phylum: Arthropoda
- Class: Insecta
- Order: Lepidoptera
- Family: Geometridae
- Genus: Scopula
- Species: S. ourebi

Binomial name
- Scopula ourebi Herbulot, 1985

Species of geometer moth in subfamily Sterrhinae

Scopula ourebi is a moth of the family Geometridae. It was described by Claude Herbulot in 1985. It is found in South Africa.
