= Scopula nigricornis =

Scientific classification
- Kingdom: Animalia
- Phylum: Arthropoda
- Class: Insecta
- Order: Lepidoptera
- Family: Geometridae
- Genus: Scopula
- Species: S. nigricornis

Binomial name
- Scopula nigricornis Herbulot, 1992

Species of geometer moth in subfamily Sterrhinae

Scopula nigricornis is a moth of the family Geometridae. It is found in South Africa.
