= Scopula calothysanis =

Scientific classification
- Domain: Eukaryota
- Kingdom: Animalia
- Phylum: Arthropoda
- Class: Insecta
- Order: Lepidoptera
- Family: Geometridae
- Genus: Scopula
- Species: S. calothysanis

Binomial name
- Scopula calothysanis Herbulot, 1965

Species of geometer moth in subfamily Sterrhinae

Scopula calothysanis is a moth of the family Geometridae. It was described by Claude Herbulot in 1965. It is endemic to Madagascar.
