= Eupithecia iphiona =

Scientific classification
- Domain: Eukaryota
- Kingdom: Animalia
- Phylum: Arthropoda
- Class: Insecta
- Order: Lepidoptera
- Family: Geometridae
- Genus: Eupithecia
- Species: E. iphiona

Binomial name
- Eupithecia iphiona Herbulot, 1987

Species of moth

Eupithecia iphiona is a moth in the family Geometridae. It is found in Bolivia. The scientific name of the species was first validly published in 1987 by Claude Herbulot.
