= Scopula oryx =

Scientific classification
- Domain: Eukaryota
- Kingdom: Animalia
- Phylum: Arthropoda
- Class: Insecta
- Order: Lepidoptera
- Family: Geometridae
- Genus: Scopula
- Species: S. oryx

Binomial name
- Scopula oryx Herbulot, 1985

Species of geometer moth in subfamily Sterrhinae

Scopula oryx is a moth of the family Geometridae. It was described by Claude Herbulot in 1985. It is endemic to South Africa.
