= Herbulotides lymantrina =

Scientific classification
- Kingdom: Animalia
- Phylum: Arthropoda
- Clade: Pancrustacea
- Class: Insecta
- Order: Lepidoptera
- Family: Geometridae
- Genus: Herbulotides
- Species: H. lymantrina

Binomial name
- Herbulotides lymantrina (Herbulot, 1970)

Synonyms
- Pseudocrocinis lymantrina Herbulot, 1970

Species of moth

Herbulotides lymantrina is a species of moth of the family Geometridae first described by Claude Herbulot in 1970. It is found in northern Madagascar.

The length of its forewings is 22 mm.
