= Eupithecia guamanica =

Scientific classification
- Domain: Eukaryota
- Kingdom: Animalia
- Phylum: Arthropoda
- Class: Insecta
- Order: Lepidoptera
- Family: Geometridae
- Genus: Eupithecia
- Species: E. guamanica

Binomial name
- Eupithecia guamanica Herbulot, 1993

Species of moth

Eupithecia guamanica is a moth in the family Geometridae. It is found in the high Andes of Ecuador.
