= Eupithecia dissonans =

Scientific classification
- Domain: Eukaryota
- Kingdom: Animalia
- Phylum: Arthropoda
- Class: Insecta
- Order: Lepidoptera
- Family: Geometridae
- Genus: Eupithecia
- Species: E. dissonans

Binomial name
- Eupithecia dissonans Herbulot, 1954

Species of moth

Eupithecia dissonans is a moth in the family Geometridae. It is found in Madagascar.
