= Scopula kohor =

Scientific classification
- Domain: Eukaryota
- Kingdom: Animalia
- Phylum: Arthropoda
- Class: Insecta
- Order: Lepidoptera
- Family: Geometridae
- Genus: Scopula
- Species: S. kohor

Binomial name
- Scopula kohor Herbulot & Viette, 1952

Species of geometer moth in subfamily Sterrhinae

Scopula kohor is a moth of the family Geometridae. It was described by Claude Herbulot and Pierre Viette in 1952. It is endemic to Chad.
