= Scopula gibbivalvata =

Scientific classification
- Domain: Eukaryota
- Kingdom: Animalia
- Phylum: Arthropoda
- Class: Insecta
- Order: Lepidoptera
- Family: Geometridae
- Genus: Scopula
- Species: S. gibbivalvata

Binomial name
- Scopula gibbivalvata Herbulot, 1972

Species of geometer moth in subfamily Sterrhinae

Scopula gibbivalvata is a moth of the family Geometridae. It is found on Madagascar.
