= Eupithecia cohabitans =

Scientific classification
- Kingdom: Animalia
- Phylum: Arthropoda
- Clade: Pancrustacea
- Class: Insecta
- Order: Lepidoptera
- Family: Geometridae
- Genus: Eupithecia
- Species: E. cohabitans

Binomial name
- Eupithecia cohabitans Herbulot, 1972

Species of moth

Eupithecia cohabitans is a moth in the family Geometridae. It is found in Madagascar.
