= Eupithecia marpessa =

Scientific classification
- Domain: Eukaryota
- Kingdom: Animalia
- Phylum: Arthropoda
- Class: Insecta
- Order: Lepidoptera
- Family: Geometridae
- Genus: Eupithecia
- Species: E. marpessa

Binomial name
- Eupithecia marpessa Herbulot, 1987

Species of moth

Eupithecia marpessa is a moth in the family Geometridae. It is found in Ecuador.
