= Ritter-von-Spix-Medal =

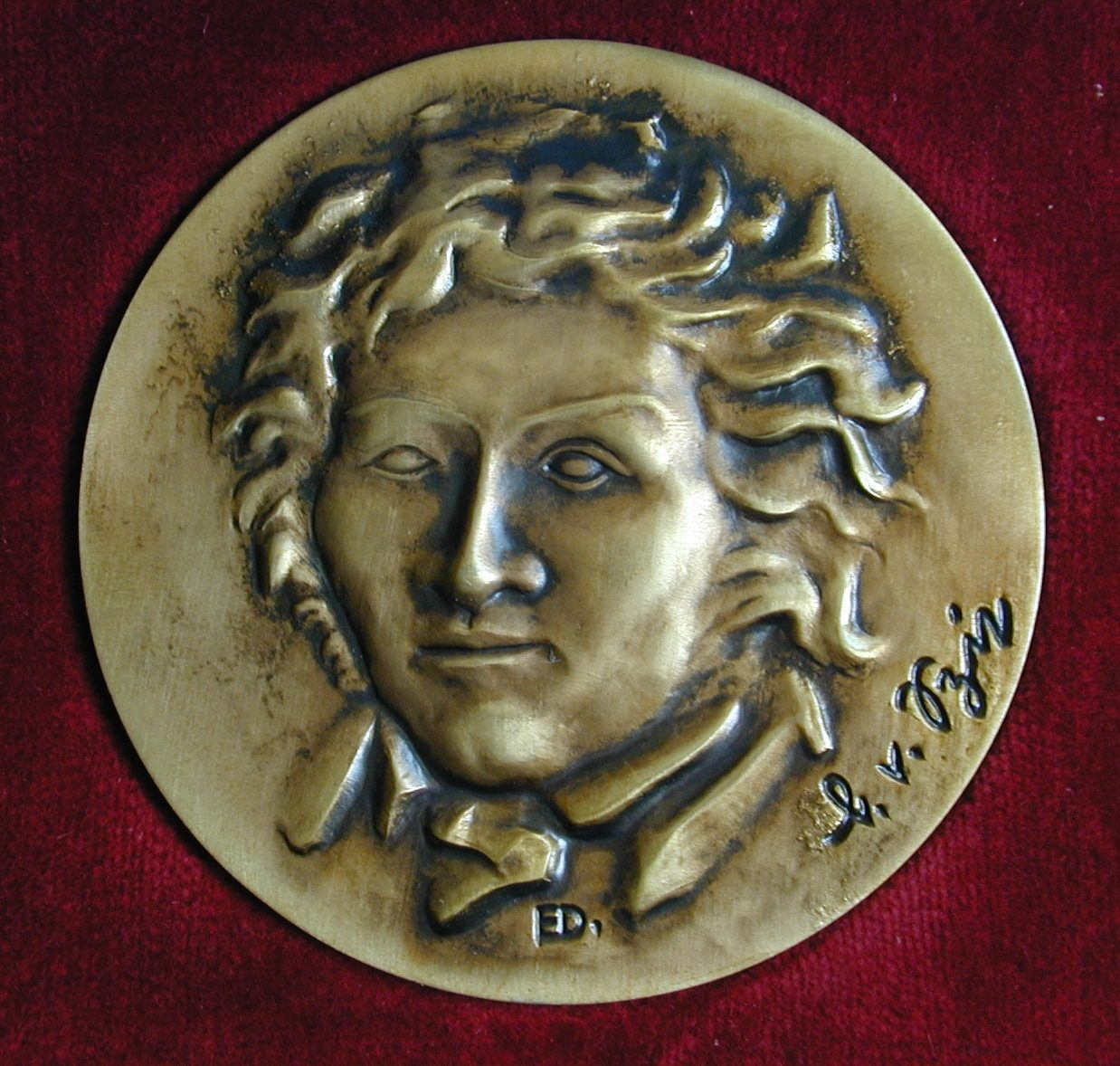
Ritter-von-Spix-Medal

The Zoologische Staatssammlung München (The Bavarian State Collection of Zoology) awards the Ritter-von-Spix-Medal to distinguished donors and benefactors of outstanding zoological collections. The German research institution has built up one of the largest natural history collections in the world with over 20 million zoological specimens.

The award is named after Johann Baptist von Spix, the institution's founder and first curator, and is granted sporadically since the 200th birthday of von Spix, 1981.

== Award winners (since 2000) ==
- 2013 - Philippe Darge
- 2011 - Axel Alf
- 2010 - Lutz W. R. Kobes
- 2008 - Zoltán Varga
- 2003 - Karl-Heinz Fuchs
- 2003 - Heinz Politzar
- 2001 - Thomas Witt, Museum Witt
- 2001 - Claude Herbulot
- 2000 - Ulf Eitschberger
