= Neochalcosia witti =

Scientific classification
- Kingdom: Animalia
- Phylum: Arthropoda
- Clade: Pancrustacea
- Class: Insecta
- Order: Lepidoptera
- Family: Zygaenidae
- Genus: Neochalcosia
- Species: N. witti

Binomial name
- Neochalcosia witti Buchsbaum, Chen & Speidel, 2010

Species of moth

Neochalcosia witti is a moth in the family Zygaenidae. It is found in China (Sichuan, Shaanxi).

The wingspan is 42–58 mm for males and about 52 mm for females. Both the fore- and hindwings have a white band.

== Etymology ==
The species is named for Mr. Thomas J. Witt, the founder of the Museum Witt in Munich.
