= Scopula nigralba =

Scientific classification
- Domain: Eukaryota
- Kingdom: Animalia
- Phylum: Arthropoda
- Class: Insecta
- Order: Lepidoptera
- Family: Geometridae
- Genus: Scopula
- Species: S. nigralba

Binomial name
- Scopula nigralba Herbulot, 1978

Species of geometer moth in subfamily Sterrhinae

Scopula nigralba is a moth of the family Geometridae. It is found in Cameroon.
