= Eupithecia dargei =

Scientific classification
- Domain: Eukaryota
- Kingdom: Animalia
- Phylum: Arthropoda
- Class: Insecta
- Order: Lepidoptera
- Family: Geometridae
- Genus: Eupithecia
- Species: E. dargei

Binomial name
- Eupithecia dargei Herbulot, 1988

Species of moth

Eupithecia dargei is a moth in the family Geometridae. It is found in Cameroon.
