= Scopula sanguinifissa =

Scientific classification
- Kingdom: Animalia
- Phylum: Arthropoda
- Class: Insecta
- Order: Lepidoptera
- Family: Geometridae
- Genus: Scopula
- Species: S. sanguinifissa

Binomial name
- Scopula sanguinifissa Herbulot, 1955/1956

Species of geometer moth in subfamily Sterrhinae

Scopula sanguinifissa is a moth of the family Geometridae. It is found in Madagascar.
