= Eupithecia decussata =

Scientific classification
- Domain: Eukaryota
- Kingdom: Animalia
- Phylum: Arthropoda
- Class: Insecta
- Order: Lepidoptera
- Family: Geometridae
- Genus: Eupithecia
- Species: E. decussata

Binomial name
- Eupithecia decussata Herbulot, 1997

Synonyms
- Pholana venosata Fabricius; Pholana decussata Donovan

Species of moth

Eupithecia decussata is a moth in the family Geometridae. It was described by Claude Herbulot in 1997. It is found in the Republic of Congo.
