= Scopula abolita =

Scientific classification
- Domain: Eukaryota
- Kingdom: Animalia
- Phylum: Arthropoda
- Class: Insecta
- Order: Lepidoptera
- Family: Geometridae
- Genus: Scopula
- Species: S. abolita

Binomial name
- Scopula abolita Herbulot, [1956]

Species of geometer moths in subfamily Sterrhinae

Scopula abolita is a moth of the family Geometridae. It was described by Claude Herbulot in 1956. It is endemic to Madagascar.
