= Eupithecia pseudexheres =

Scientific classification
- Kingdom: Animalia
- Phylum: Arthropoda
- Clade: Pancrustacea
- Class: Insecta
- Order: Lepidoptera
- Family: Geometridae
- Genus: Eupithecia
- Species: E. pseudexheres

Binomial name
- Eupithecia pseudexheres Herbulot, 1972

Species of moth

Eupithecia pseudexheres is a moth in the family Geometridae. It is found in Madagascar.
