= Eupithecia acragas =

Scientific classification
- Domain: Eukaryota
- Kingdom: Animalia
- Phylum: Arthropoda
- Class: Insecta
- Order: Lepidoptera
- Family: Geometridae
- Genus: Eupithecia
- Species: E. acragas

Binomial name
- Eupithecia acragas Herbulot, 1987

Species of geometer moth

Eupithecia acragas is a moth species in the family Geometridae with a type locality in Bolivia. It's also known from Ecuador, where some specimens have been found in the southern province Zamora-Chinchipe at altitudes between 2200 and 2700 m.
