= Scopula colymbas =

Scientific classification
- Kingdom: Animalia
- Phylum: Arthropoda
- Class: Insecta
- Order: Lepidoptera
- Family: Geometridae
- Genus: Scopula
- Species: S. colymbas

Binomial name
- Scopula colymbas Herbulot, 1994

Species of geometer moth in subfamily Sterrhinae

Scopula colymbas is a moth of the family Geometridae. It was described by Claude Herbulot in 1994. It is found on Socotra, an island near the Arabian Sea, which is part of Yemen.
