= Eois incandescens =

Scientific classification
- Kingdom: Animalia
- Phylum: Arthropoda
- Clade: Pancrustacea
- Class: Insecta
- Order: Lepidoptera
- Family: Geometridae
- Genus: Eois
- Species: E. incandescens

Binomial name
- Eois incandescens Herbulot, 1954

Species of moth

Eois incandescens is a moth in the family Geometridae. It is found in Madagascar.
