= Eupithecia montavoni =

Scientific classification
- Domain: Eukaryota
- Kingdom: Animalia
- Phylum: Arthropoda
- Class: Insecta
- Order: Lepidoptera
- Family: Geometridae
- Genus: Eupithecia
- Species: E. montavoni

Binomial name
- Eupithecia montavoni Herbulot, 1990

Species of moth

Eupithecia montavoni is a moth in the family Geometridae. It is found in Tanzania.
