= Scopula seclusoides =

Scientific classification
- Kingdom: Animalia
- Phylum: Arthropoda
- Class: Insecta
- Order: Lepidoptera
- Family: Geometridae
- Genus: Scopula
- Species: S. seclusoides

Binomial name
- Scopula seclusoides Herbulot, 1978

Species of geometer moth in subfamily Sterrhinae

Scopula seclusoides is a moth of the family Geometridae. It is found in Cameroon.
