= Eupithecia phulchokiana =

Scientific classification
- Kingdom: Animalia
- Phylum: Arthropoda
- Class: Insecta
- Order: Lepidoptera
- Family: Geometridae
- Genus: Eupithecia
- Species: E. phulchokiana

Binomial name
- Eupithecia phulchokiana Herbulot, 1984

Species of moth

Eupithecia phulchokiana is a moth in the family Geometridae first described by Claude Herbulot in 1984. It is found in Nepal and Thailand.
