= Eupithecia descimoni =

Scientific classification
- Domain: Eukaryota
- Kingdom: Animalia
- Phylum: Arthropoda
- Class: Insecta
- Order: Lepidoptera
- Family: Geometridae
- Genus: Eupithecia
- Species: E. descimoni

Binomial name
- Eupithecia descimoni Herbulot, 1987

Synonyms
- Eupithecia descimoni occidens Herbulot, 1987 (preocc.)

Species of moth

Eupithecia descimoni is a moth in the family Geometridae. It is found in Ecuador, Peru and Bolivia.

== Subspecies ==
- Eupithecia descimoni descimoni
- Eupithecia descimoni ecuador Kocak, 2004 (Ecuador)
