= Eupithecia zombensis =

Scientific classification
- Domain: Eukaryota
- Kingdom: Animalia
- Phylum: Arthropoda
- Class: Insecta
- Order: Lepidoptera
- Family: Geometridae
- Genus: Eupithecia
- Species: E. zombensis

Binomial name
- Eupithecia zombensis Herbulot, 1990

Species of moth

Eupithecia zombensis is a moth in the family Geometridae. It is found in Tanzania.
