= Scopula glaucescens =

Scientific classification
- Domain: Eukaryota
- Kingdom: Animalia
- Phylum: Arthropoda
- Class: Insecta
- Order: Lepidoptera
- Family: Geometridae
- Genus: Scopula
- Species: S. glaucescens

Binomial name
- Scopula glaucescens Herbulot, 1978

Species of geometer moth in subfamily Sterrhinae

Scopula glaucescens is a moth of the family Geometridae. It was described by Claude Herbulot in 1978. It is endemic to Madagascar.
