= Scopula infantilis =

Scientific classification
- Domain: Eukaryota
- Kingdom: Animalia
- Phylum: Arthropoda
- Class: Insecta
- Order: Lepidoptera
- Family: Geometridae
- Genus: Scopula
- Species: S. infantilis

Binomial name
- Scopula infantilis Herbulot, 1970

Species of geometer moth in subfamily Sterrhinae

Scopula infantilis is a moth of the family Geometridae first described by Claude Herbulot in 1970. It is found on Madagascar.

The length of its forewing is 8 millimeters and the holotype was collected in the Ivelona valley, Andranomalaza, Madagascar.
