= Scopula manengouba =

Scientific classification
- Domain: Eukaryota
- Kingdom: Animalia
- Phylum: Arthropoda
- Class: Insecta
- Order: Lepidoptera
- Family: Geometridae
- Genus: Scopula
- Species: S. manengouba

Binomial name
- Scopula manengouba Herbulot, 1992

Species of geometer moth in subfamily Sterrhinae

Scopula manengouba is a moth of the family Geometridae. It is found in Tanzania.
