= Scopula dargei =

Scientific classification
- Kingdom: Animalia
- Phylum: Arthropoda
- Class: Insecta
- Order: Lepidoptera
- Family: Geometridae
- Genus: Scopula
- Species: S. dargei

Binomial name
- Scopula dargei Herbulot, 1992

Species of geometer moth in subfamily Sterrhinae

Scopula dargei is a moth of the family Geometridae. It was described by Claude Herbulot in 1992. It is endemic to Cameroon.
