= Parortholitha ingens =

Scientific classification
- Domain: Eukaryota
- Kingdom: Animalia
- Phylum: Arthropoda
- Class: Insecta
- Order: Lepidoptera
- Family: Geometridae
- Genus: Parortholitha
- Species: P. ingens

Binomial name
- Parortholitha ingens Herbulot, 1970

Species of moth

Parortholitha ingens is a species of moth of the family Geometridae first described by Claude Herbulot in 1970. It is found in northern Madagascar.

The length of its forewings is 18.5 mm.
