= Eupithecia nadiae =

Scientific classification
- Domain: Eukaryota
- Kingdom: Animalia
- Phylum: Arthropoda
- Class: Insecta
- Order: Lepidoptera
- Family: Geometridae
- Genus: Eupithecia
- Species: E. nadiae

Binomial name
- Eupithecia nadiae Herbulot, 1993

Species of moth

Eupithecia nadiae is a moth in the family Geometridae. It is found in the high Andes of Ecuador.
