= Eupithecia phoebe =

Scientific classification
- Domain: Eukaryota
- Kingdom: Animalia
- Phylum: Arthropoda
- Class: Insecta
- Order: Lepidoptera
- Family: Geometridae
- Genus: Eupithecia
- Species: E. phoebe

Binomial name
- Eupithecia phoebe Herbulot, 1987

Species of moth

Eupithecia phoebe is a moth in the family Geometridae first described by Claude Herbulot in 1987. It is found in Bolivia.
