= Eupithecia venedictoffae =

Scientific classification
- Domain: Eukaryota
- Kingdom: Animalia
- Phylum: Arthropoda
- Class: Insecta
- Order: Lepidoptera
- Family: Geometridae
- Genus: Eupithecia
- Species: E. venedictoffae

Binomial name
- Eupithecia venedictoffae Herbulot, 1987

Species of moth

Eupithecia venedictoffae is a moth in the family Geometridae. It is found in Ecuador.
