= Anticleora =

Scientific classification
- Kingdom: Animalia
- Phylum: Arthropoda
- Class: Insecta
- Order: Lepidoptera
- Family: Geometridae
- Subfamily: Ennominae
- Genus: Anticleora; Herbulot

Genus of geometer moths

Anticleora is a genus of moths in the family Geometridae. It was described by Claude Herbulot in 1966.
