= Parortholitha =

Scientific classification
- Kingdom: Animalia
- Phylum: Arthropoda
- Class: Insecta
- Order: Lepidoptera
- Family: Geometridae
- Genus: Parortholitha; Herbulot, 1955

Genus of moths

Parortholitha is a genus of moths in the family Geometridae erected by Claude Herbulot in 1955.

== Species ==
- Parortholitha chrysographa Herbulot, 1972
- Parortholitha cubitata Herbulot, 1981
- Parortholitha indocilis Herbulot, 1963
- Parortholitha ingens Herbulot, 1970
- Parortholitha moerdyki Herbulot, 1980
- Parortholitha subrectaria Walker, 1861
- Parortholitha recta Prout, 1916
