= Darisodes =

Scientific classification
- Kingdom: Animalia
- Phylum: Arthropoda
- Class: Insecta
- Order: Lepidoptera
- Family: Geometridae
- Subfamily: Ennominae
- Genus: Darisodes; Herbulot, 1972

Genus of moths

Darisodes is a genus of moths in the family Geometridae. It was first described by Claude Herbulot in 1972.

== Species ==
Some species of this genus are:

- Darisodes cuneata Herbulot, 1972
- Darisodes oritropha (D. S. Fletcher, 1958)
- Darisodes orygaria (Guenée, 1862)
