= Dargeia =

Scientific classification
- Kingdom: Animalia
- Phylum: Arthropoda
- Class: Insecta
- Order: Lepidoptera
- Family: Geometridae
- Subfamily: Geometrinae
- Genus: Dargeia; Herbulot, 1977

Type species
- Dargeia micheleae Herbulot, 1977

Genus of moths

Dargeia is a genus of moths in the family Geometridae erected by Claude Herbulot in 1977.
