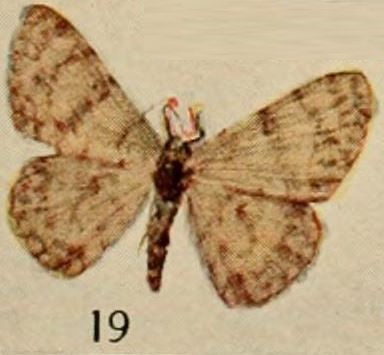

Scientific classification
- Kingdom: Animalia
- Phylum: Arthropoda
- Clade: Pancrustacea
- Class: Insecta
- Order: Lepidoptera
- Family: Geometridae
- Genus: Dorsifulcrum
- Species: D. cephalotes

Binomial name
- Dorsifulcrum cephalotes (Walker, 1869)

Synonyms
- Scodiona cephalotes Walker, 1869; Pseudoterpna chapinaria Holland, 1920; Dorsifulcrum chapinarium; Ectropis zebrina Warren, 1902

= Dorsifulcrum cephalotes =

Species of moth

Dorsifulcrum cephalotes is a moth of the family Geometridae first described by Francis Walker in 1869. It is found in Angola, Cameroon, the Central African Republic, the Democratic Republic of the Congo, Gabon, Ghana, Guinea, Ivory Coast, Nigeria and Rwanda.
