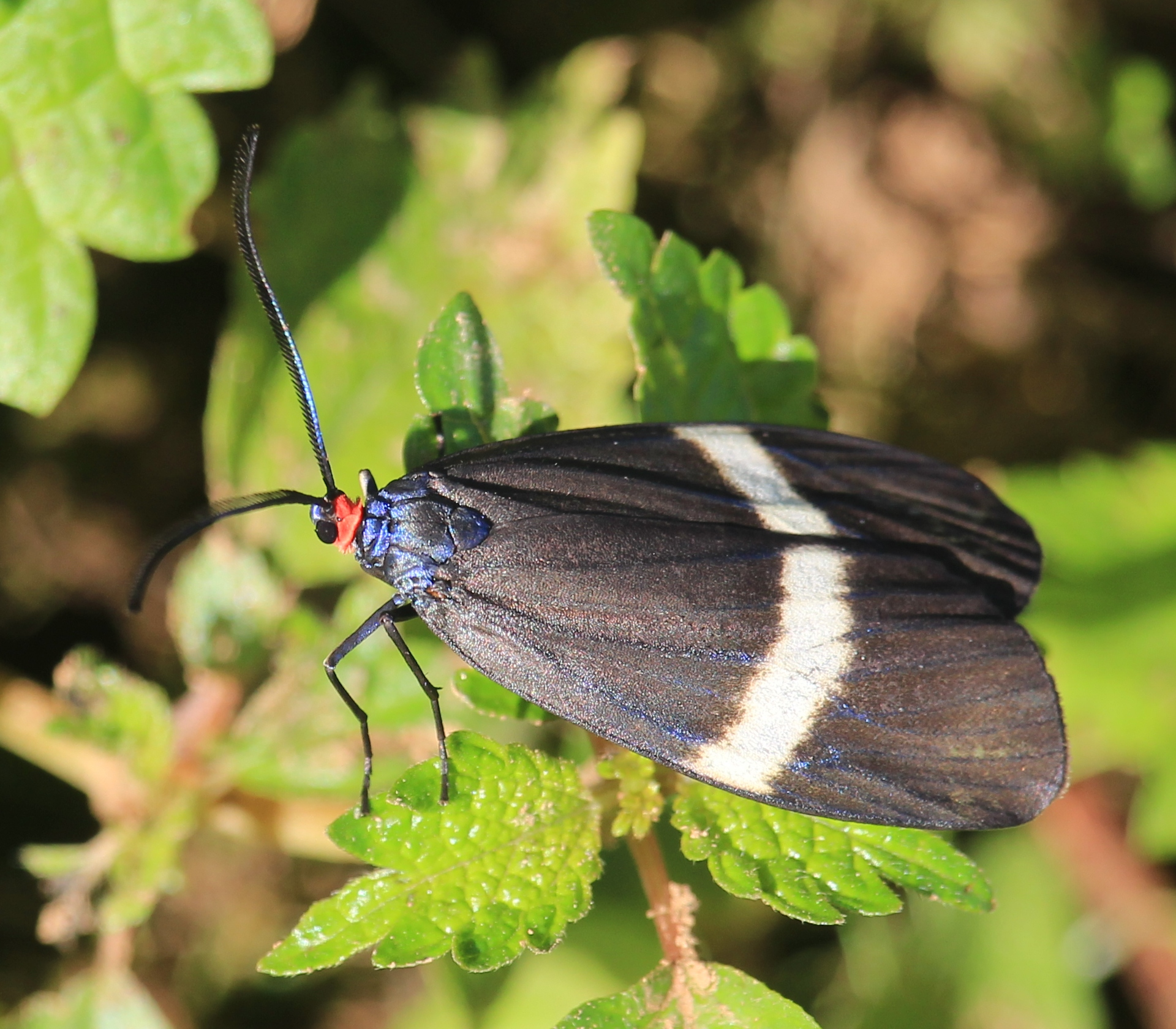
- Neochalcosia

Scientific classification
- Domain: Eukaryota
- Kingdom: Animalia
- Phylum: Arthropoda
- Class: Insecta
- Order: Lepidoptera
- Family: Zygaenidae
- Subfamily: Chalcosiinae
- Genus: Neochalcosia; Yen & Yang, 1997

= Neochalcosia =

Genus of moths

Neochalcosia is a genus of moths of the family Zygaenidae.

== Species ==
- Neochalcosia remota (Walker, 1862)
- Neochalcosia nanlingensis Owada, Horie & Min, 2006
- Neochalcosia witti Buchsbaum, Chen & Speidel, 2010
