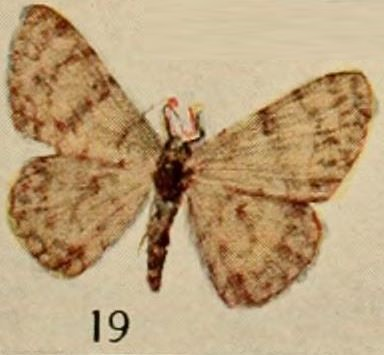
- Dorsifulcrum cephalotes

Scientific classification
- Kingdom: Animalia
- Phylum: Arthropoda
- Clade: Pancrustacea
- Class: Insecta
- Order: Lepidoptera
- Family: Geometridae
- Subfamily: Ennominae
- Genus: Dorsifulcrum; Herbulot, 1979

= Dorsifulcrum =

Genus of moths

Dorsifulcrum is a genus of moths in the family Geometridae erected by Claude Herbulot in 1979.

== Species ==
- Dorsifulcrum acutum Herbulot, 1979
- Dorsifulcrum albescens Herbulot, 1979
- Dorsifulcrum bicolor Herbulot, 1979
- Dorsifulcrum canui Herbulot, 1998
- Dorsifulcrum cephalotes (Walker, 1869)
- Dorsifulcrum excavatum Herbulot, 1979
- Dorsifulcrum fuscum Herbulot, 1979
- Dorsifulcrum latum Herbulot, 1979
- Dorsifulcrum meloui Herbulot, 1979
- Dorsifulcrum mus Herbulot, 1979
- Dorsifulcrum pinheyi Herbulot, 1979
- Dorsifulcrum reductum Herbulot, 1979
- Dorsifulcrum reflexum Herbulot, 1979
- Dorsifulcrum rotundum Herbulot, 1979
- Dorsifulcrum xeron Herbulot, 1979
