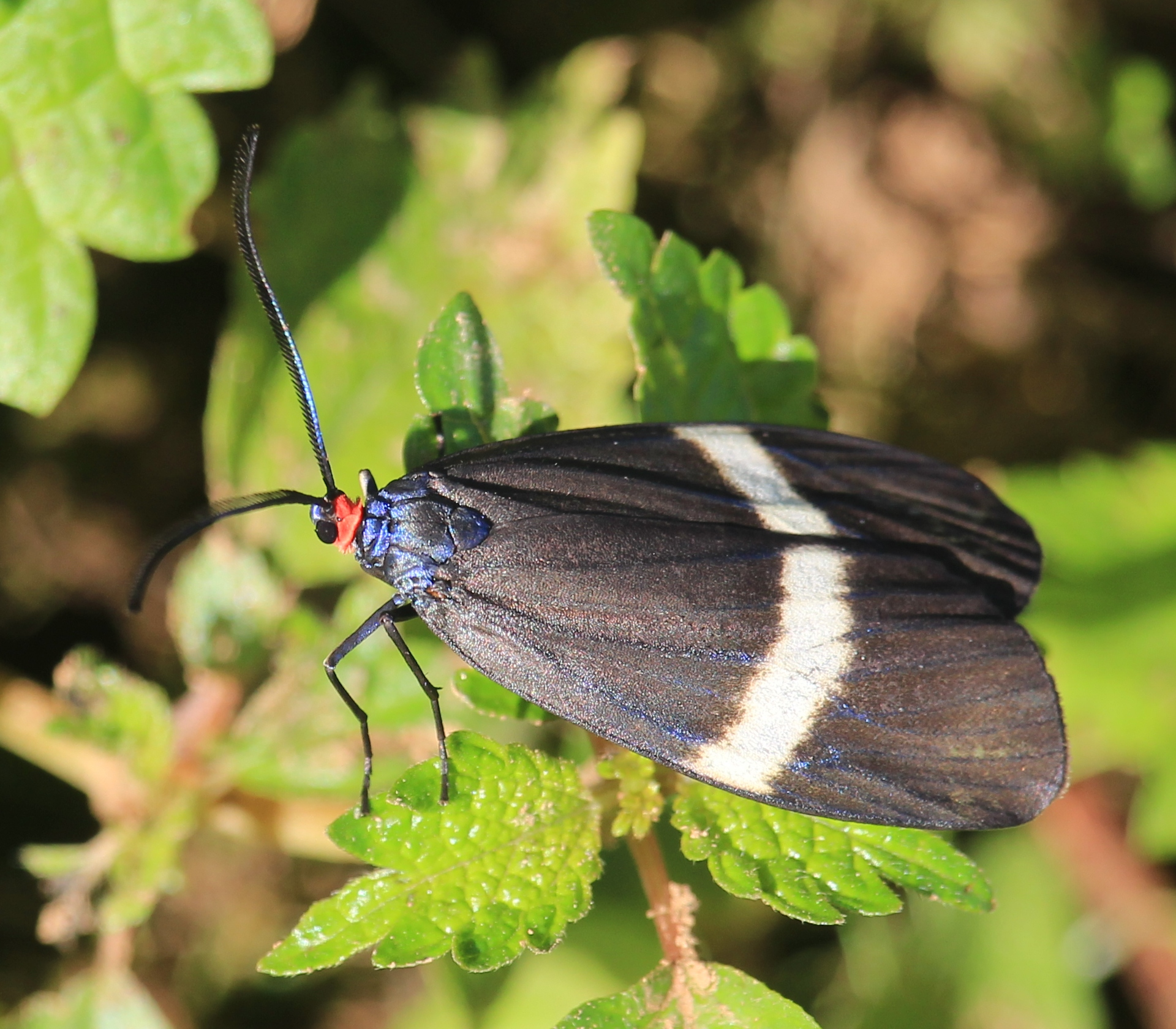

Scientific classification
- Kingdom: Animalia
- Phylum: Arthropoda
- Class: Insecta
- Order: Lepidoptera
- Family: Zygaenidae
- Genus: Neochalcosia
- Species: N. remota

Binomial name
- Neochalcosia remota (Walker, 1862)

Synonyms
- Eterusia remota Walker, 1854; Laurion remota; Chalcosia remota

= Neochalcosia remota =

Species of moth

Neochalcosia remota is a moth in the family Zygaenidae. It is found in China (Sichuan, Shaanxi, Gansu), Korea, Japan and Taiwan. The habitat consists of parks and areas with Quercus species.

The wingspan is 50–55 mm.

The larvae feed on Symplocos species.

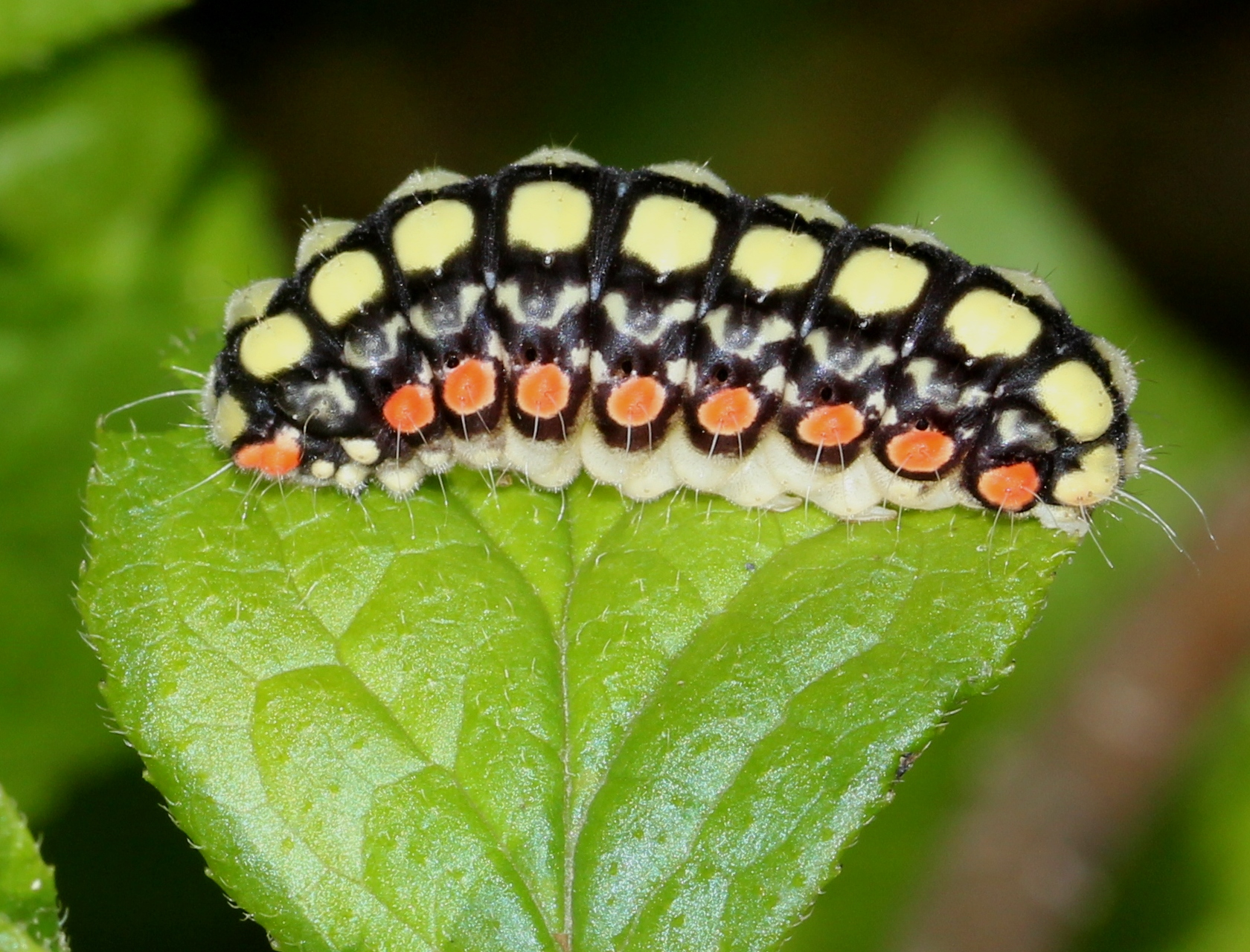
Caterpillar
