= Witt Weiden =

Josef Witt GmbH
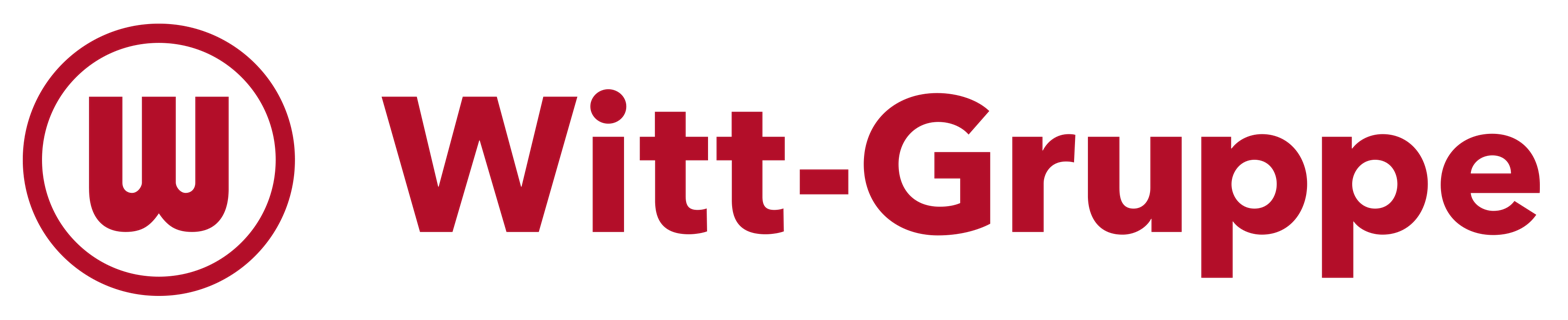
- Type: Subsidiary
- Industry: Mail-order business
- Founded: 1907
- Founder: Josef Witt
- Headquarters: Weiden, Germany
- Key people: Patrick Boos (chairman); Stefanie Zühlke-Schmidt; Jürgen Angstmann; Johann Kiener
- Revenue: €1.178 billion
- Number of employees: 3,700
- Parent: Otto Group
- Website: https://www.witt-gruppe.eu/

Josef Witt GmbH (Witt-Gruppe) is a mail-order house, located in Weiden, Germany. The company is a 100% subsidiary of the Otto Group. Witt-Gruppe's oldest and best known brand is Witt Weiden.

== History ==
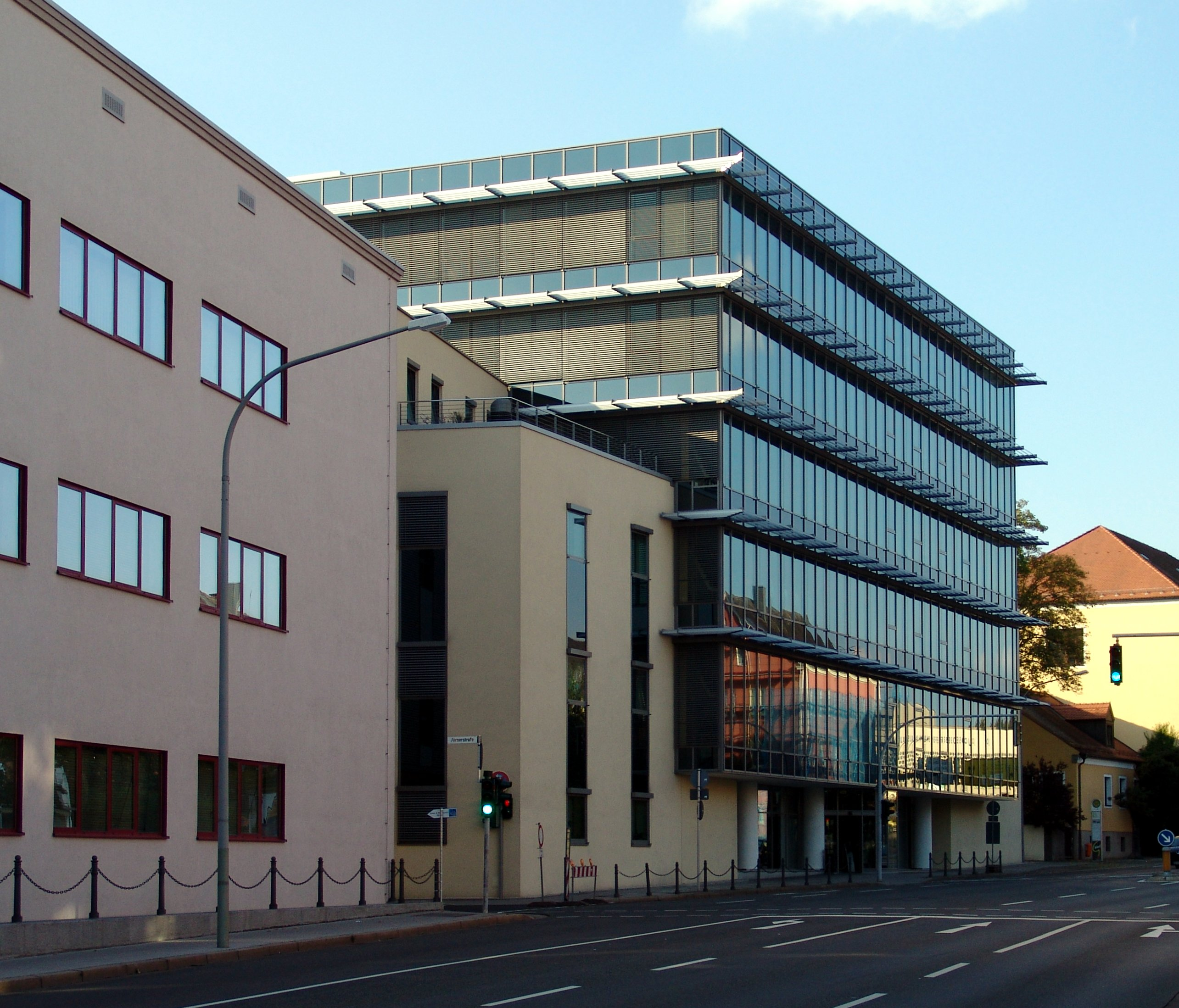
Witt

Josef Witt

The company is the oldest mail-order house for clothes in Germany. It was founded in 1907 by Josef Witt (1884-1954). Josef Witt is regarded as a pioneer in the mail-order business in Germany.

In 1907 he took over his sister's grocer's store in Reuth bei Erbendorf. This was the beginning of what became later an extremely successful mail-order house.

In the 1930s the business had expanded significantly. The company had a workforce of 5,000 employees; sales raised to 86 million Reichsmarks. After the death of Josef Witt, his wife Monika continued the business operations from 1954 to 1958. Then their son, Josef Witt Jr., took over. Because of a sales crisis in the 1980s, the company was sold to Schwab, a subsidiary of the Otto Group.

The firm had an annual turnover of €1.178 billion in the fiscal year 2022-2023.

The company comprises eleven brands and sells its products in ten countries worldwide. Witt-Gruppe's oldest and best known brand ist Witt Weiden.

Thomas Witt, the grandson of Josef Witt, founded the Museum Witt in Munich. The Witt family has no financial stake in Witt-Gruppe.
