= Orbamia =

Scientific classification
- Kingdom: Animalia
- Phylum: Arthropoda
- Clade: Pancrustacea
- Class: Insecta
- Order: Lepidoptera
- Family: Geometridae
- Subfamily: Ennominae
- Genus: Orbamia; Herbulot, 1966

Genus of moths

Orbamia is a genus of moths in the family Geometridae described by Claude Herbulot in 1966.

== Species ==
Orbamia contains the following species:

- Orbamia abiyi Hausmann & Tujuba, 2020
- Orbamia balensis Hausmann & Tujuba, 2020
- Orbamia becki Hausmann, 2006
- Orbamia clarior Hausmann & Tujuba, 2020
- Orbamia clarissima Hausmann & Tujuba, 2020
- Orbamia emanai Hausmann & Tujuba, 2020
- Orbamia marginata Hausmann & Tujuba, 2020
- Orbamia obliqua Hausmann & Tujuba, 2020
- Orbamia ocellata (Warren, 1897)
- Orbamia octomaculata (Wallengren, 1872)
- Orbamia pauperata Herbulot, 1966
- Orbamia renimacula (Prout, 1926)
