= Dyschlorodes =

Scientific classification
- Kingdom: Animalia
- Phylum: Arthropoda
- Class: Insecta
- Order: Lepidoptera
- Family: Geometridae
- Subfamily: Geometrinae
- Genus: Dyschlorodes; Herbulot, 1966

Genus of moths

Dyschlorodes is a genus of moths in the family Geometridae erected by Claude Herbulot in 1966. All the species in this genus are from Madagascar.

== Species ==
- Dyschlorodes bicolor Viette, 1971
- Dyschlorodes hepatias Herbulot, 1966
