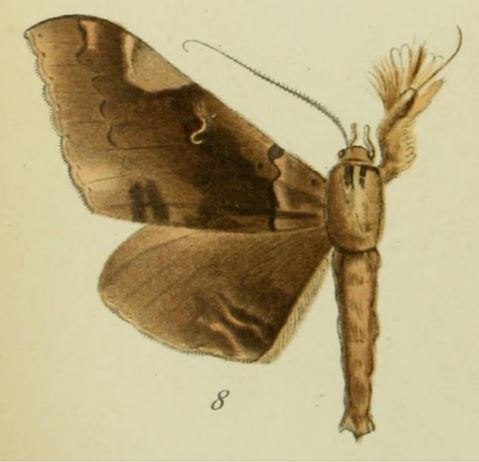
- Rougeotiana rogator

Scientific classification
- Domain: Eukaryota
- Kingdom: Animalia
- Phylum: Arthropoda
- Class: Insecta
- Order: Lepidoptera
- Superfamily: Noctuoidea
- Family: Erebidae
- Subfamily: Calpinae
- Genus: Rougeotiana; Laporte, 1974

= Rougeotiana =

Genus of moths

Rougeotiana is a genus of moths of the family Erebidae. The genus was erected by Bernard Laporte in 1974.

== Species ==
- Rougeotiana busira (Strand, 1918)
- Rougeotiana pseudonoctua Herbulot, 1983
- Rougeotiana rogator (Bryk, 1915)
- Rougeotiana xanthoperas (Hampson, 1926)
