= Bavarian State Collection of Zoology =

German research institution

Coordinates: 48°09′53″N 11°28′55″E

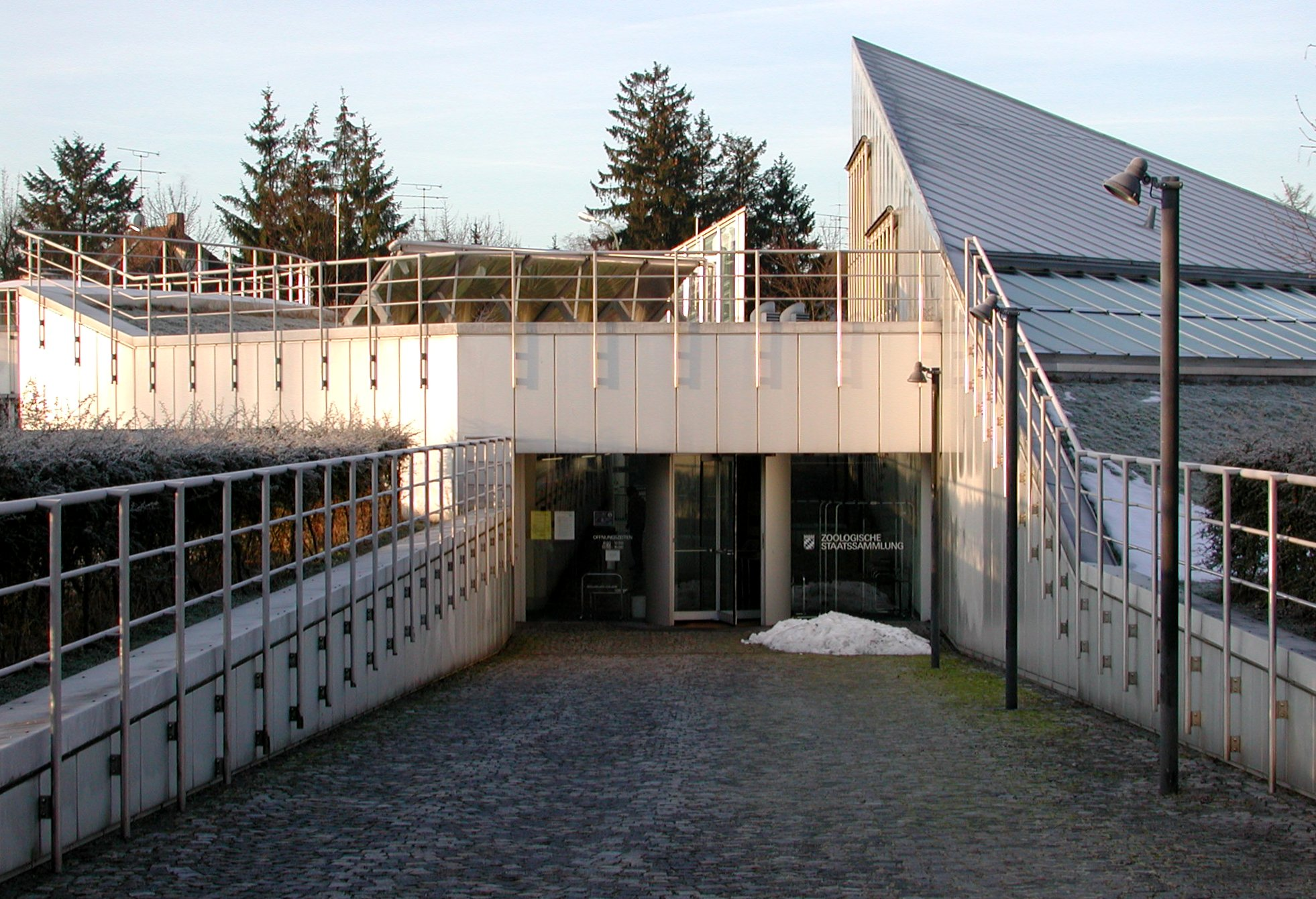
Entrance of the ZSM

The Bavarian State Collection of Zoology (German: Zoologische Staatssammlung München) or ZSM is a major German research institution for zoological systematics in Munich. It has over 20 million zoological specimens. It is one of the largest natural history collections in the world. The sections are Entomology, Invertebrates and Vertebrates. The history of the museum is outlined on the museum's home page together with a biography of Johann Baptist von Spix the first curator of zoology.

== See also ==
- Museum Witt – Museum Witt Munich (MWM) is a department of the Bavarian State Collection of Zoology (Zoologische Staatssammlung München).
- List of museums in Germany
- List of natural history museums
