= Museum Witt =

Museum in Germany

Coordinates: 48°09′35″N 11°34′08″E

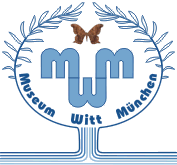
Museum Witt

The Museum Witt Munich (MWM) is a department of the Bavarian State Collection of Zoology. The former independent museum was located in Munich, Germany, and had the world's leading collection of certain moths. The museum was closed in 2023. The entire collection was handed over to the Bavarian State Collection.

== Collection ==
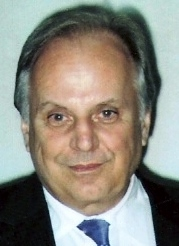
Thomas J. Witt, the founder of the museum

The museum was established in 1980 by Thomas J. Witt. His well-known family founded Witt Weiden, one of Germany's oldest mail-order houses.

Since 2000, the museum has been part of the Zoologische Staatssammlung München (The Bavarian State Collection of Zoology) in Munich. The collection consists of about ten million specimens from all over the world. It is the largest collection of certain moths in the world. The Museum Witt has a collection of three to three and a half million butterflies, and the Bavarian State Collection of Zoology additional seven million butterflies. A crew of scientists work at the museum and it has an impressive library.

Thomas J. Witt was awarded with the Ritter-von-Spix-Medal in 2001. He also received an honorary doctorate from LMU Munich in 2013.

== Publications ==
- Ivinskis P. & Witt T.J. Moths and Hawkmoths of Lithuania.
- Thöny H. & Witt T. 2019. Entomologische Bibliographie von Dr. h.c. Georg Warnecke (28. April 1883 - 20. September 1962). Entomofauna. 40.
- Grehan J.R. & Mielke C.G.C. & Ignatyev N. & De Groof B. & Austin K. & Witt T.J. 2019. Three new species of Endoclita C. &. R. Felder, 1874 from northern Laos and Thailand (Lepidoptera: Hepialidae). Entomofauna. 40.
- Ignatev N. & Przybylowicz L. & Witt T. 2019. A review of the genus Mecistorhabdia Kiriakoff, 1953 (Lepidoptera: Erebidae, Artciinae, Syntomini, Thyretina) with description of a new species from Central African Republic, Africa. Zootaxa.
- Witt T. 2019. Beitrag in Zwier, J.H.H.: Aganainae of the World. A Documentation and a guide to their identification. Proceedings of the Museum Witt. 8: 1-281.
- Yakovlev R.V. & Sinev S.Yu. & Naydenov A.E. & Penco F.C. & Witt T. 2019. Redescription of the genus Allocryptobia Viette, 1951 (Lepidoptera: Cossidae). Shilap.
- De Freina J. & Witt T.J. 2018. Beschreibung von drei neu entdeckten Amata FABRICIUS, 1807-Arten von Kalimatan, Borneo, Indonesien (Lepidoptera: Erebidae, Arctiinae, Syntomini). Entomofauna. 39(2): 863-880.
- Grehan J.R. & Witt T. & Ignatev N. 2018. New Species of Aenetus from Sumatra, Indonesia (Lepidoptera: Hepialidae) representing a 5,000 km biogeographic disjunction. Entomofauna. 39(2): 849-862.
- Poltavsky A. & Kravchenko V.D. & Traore M.M. & Traore S.F. & Gergely P. & Witt T.J. & Sulak H. & Junnila A. & Revay E. & Doumbia S. & Beier J. & Müller G. 2018. The Pyraloidea (Lepidoptera) fauna of the woody savannah belt in Mali, West Africa. Zootaxa. 4457(1): 39ff.
- Speidel W. & Hausmann A. & Witt T. 2018. Revision of the erythrophleps species-group of the genus Eospilarctia Koda, 1988 (Lepidoptera, Erebidae, Arctiinae) . Entomofauna. 39(2): 817-835.
- Yakovlev R.V. & Sokolova G.G. & Witt T.J. 2018. Cecryphalini Yakovlev et Witt, trib. n. — new tribe of Carpenter-Moths (Lepidoptera: Cossidae: Zeuzerinae). Russian Entomol.J.. 27(4): 415-424.
- Yakovlev R.V. & Witt T.J. 2018. Redescription of the genus Alophonotus Schoorl, 1990 (Lepidoptera: Cossidae) based on the morphology of male and female genitalia. Shilap. 46(184): 647-652.
- Yakovlev R.V. & Witt T.J. 2018. Redescription of the little known Genus Eburgemellus Schoorl, 1990 (Lepidoptera: Cossidae) . Far Eastern Entomologist. 364: 1-5.
- Yakovlev R.V. & Witt T.J. 2018. Redescription and Catalogue of little known Genus Pseudozeuzera Schoorl, 1990 (Lepidoptera: Cossidae). Russian Entomological Journal. 27(3): 289-292.
- Brechlin R. & Witt T. 2017. Automeris maximae n. sp., eine neue Saturniide (Lepidoptera) aus Kolumbien. Entomo Satsphingia. 10(1): 18-21.
- Hofmann A. & Spalding A. & Tarmann G. & Witt T.(eds.) 2017. Gerry Tremewan (1931 – 2016). The adventurous life of a Cornish entomologist. Entomofauna Supplement. 20: 1-215.
- Vakovlev R. & Witt T. 2017. Four new species of Azygophleps Hampson, 1892 (Lepidoptera, Cossidae, Zeuzerinae) from Africa. Zootaxa.
- Witt T. & Nazarov V. 2017. Role of the entomological collections while studying the relationship of plants fertilizers. . Proceedings of International Academic and Research Conference "Actual problems Botany and Conservation", devoted to the 150th anniversary since the birth of professor G.F. Morozov (Simferopol, 28–30 November 2017) / edit. S.F. Kotov. – Simferopol: IT "ARIAL". 261-265.
- Yakovlev R.V. & Penco F.C. & Witt T.J. 2017. Five new species of the genus Schreiteriana Fletcher et Nye, 1982 (Lepidoptera: Cossidae) from Peru and Colombia (South America). Russian Entomol. J.. 26(4): 339-342.
- Yakovlev R.V. & Witt T.J. 2017. Four new species of Azygophleps Hampson, 1892 (Lepidoptera, Cossidae, Zeuzerinae) from Africa. Zootaxa. 4303(3): 437-444.
- Yakovlev R.V. & Witt T.J. 2017. Meharia Chrétien, 1915 - new genus in Zimbabwean Fauna (Lepidoptera: Cossidae). Shilap Revta. lepid.. 45(180): 589-591.
- Yakovlev R.V. & Witt Th.J. 2017. Eight new species of genus Camellocossus Yakovlev, 2011 (Lepidoptera: Cossidae) from North and East Africa. Russian Entomol. J.. 26(2): 151-159.
- Yakovlev R.V. & Witt Th.J. 2017. Redescription of the Genus Paralophonotus Schoorl, 1990 based on the morphology of male genitalia (Lepidoptera: Cossidae). Shilap Revta. lepid.. 45(180): 665-668.
- Yakovlev R. & Witt T-J- 2017. Four new species of Azygophleps Hampson, 1892 (Lepidoptera, Cossidae, Zeuzerinae) from Africa. Zootaxa.
- Yakovlev R. & Witt T. 2017. World catalogue of the genus Cossulus Staudinger, 1887 (Lepidoptera, Cossidae) with description of Cossulus irtlachi sp. nov. from Kyrgyzstan. . Zootaxa. 4311(1): 62-80.
- Dubatolov V.V. & Zolotuhin V.V. & Witt T.J. 2016. Review of Lithosia Fabricius, 1798 and Conilepia Hampson, 1900 (Lepidoptera, Arctiidae). Zootaxa. 4107(2): 175-196.
- Kravchenko V.D. & Ronkay L. & Mooser J. & Speidel W. & Revay E.E. & Witt T. & Müller G.C. 2016. An annotated checklist of the Noctuoidea of Jordan with remarks on ecology, phenology and zoogeography. Part VI. Noctuidae: Acontiinae, Acronictinae, Bagisarinae, Bryophilinae, Condicinae, Dilobinae, Eriopinae, Eustrotiinae, Heliothinae, Metoponiinae, Plusiinae, and Psaphidinae. Israel Journal of Entomology. 46: 1-10.
- Penco F.C. & Yakovlev R.V. & Witt T.J. 2016. Taxonomic notes on the genera Brypoctia Schoorl, 1990 and Schreiteriana Fletcher & Nye, 1982 (Lepidoptera, Cossidae). Zootaxa. 4205(3): 297-300.
- Sulak H. & Naumann S. & Witt T. 2016. A new species of Ceridia Rothschild & Jordan, 1903 (Lepidoptera: Sphingidae, Smerinthini) from Ethiopia. Entomofauna. 37(7): 137-148.
- Trofimova T. & Shovkoon D. & Witt T. 2016. A revision of the genus Calliteara Butler, 1881(Lepidoptera, Erebidae, Lymantriinae). Proc. Mus. Witt. 3: 1-292.
- Weigert L. & Witt T. 2016. Zu Verbreitung, Variabilität und Lebensraum von Gonerda perornata Moore, 1879 (Lepidoptera, Arctiidae) . Entomofauna. 37(38): 581-596.
- Witt T. & Beket U. & Yakovlev R.V. 2016. New data on the distribution of Cossidae (Lepidoptera) in Mongolia. Nota Lepidopterologica. 39(1): 21-25.
- Yakovlev R.V. & Penco F.C. & Witt T.J. 2016. Redescription of genus Psychonopctua Grote, 1865 (Insecta: Lepidoptera, Cossidae, Zeuzerinae). Biological Bulletin of Bogdan Chmelnltskly Melitopol State Pedagical University. 6(3): 46-50.
- Yakovlev R.V. & Witt T.J. 2016. Politzariella fountainei - New Cossidae (Lepidoptera) Species from Congo. Biological Bulletin of Bogdan Chmelnltskly Melitopol State Pedagical University. 6(3): 154-156.
- Yakovlev R.V. & Witt T. 2016. Two new species of Afroarabiella Yakovlev, 2008 (Lepidoptera, Cossidae) from Sudan and Ethiopia. European Journal of Taxonomy. 240: 1-8.
- Yakovlev R.V. & Witt T. 2016. A world catalogue of Aholcocerus Yakovlev, 2006 (Lepidoptera, Cossisae) with description of a new species from Indonesia. Zootaxa. 4305(1): 93-96.
- Yakovlev R.V. & Witt T. & Beket U. 2016. New data on the distribution of Cossidae (Lepidoptera) in Mongolia. Nota lepid. 39(1): 21-25.
- Yakovlev R. & Witt & T. 2016. A world catalogue of Phragmataecia (Lepidoptera: Cossidae), with a new species from Kazakhstan and Kyrgyzstan. Zootaxa. 4085(4): 589-600.
- Kravchenko V.D. & Mooser J. & Ronkay L. & Revay E.E. & Speidel W. & Witt T. & Müller G.C. 2015. An annotated checklist of the Noctuoidea of Jordan with remarks on ecology, phenology and zoogeography. Part V: Noctuinae (Lepidoptera, Noctuidae). SHILAP (Revista de Lepidopterología). 43(172): 517-523.
- Kravchenko V.D. & Revay E.E. & Mooser J. & Ronkay L. & Witt T. & Speidel W. & Müller G.C. 2015. An annotated checklist of the Noctuoidea of Jordan with remarks on ecology, phenology and zoogeography. Part III: Xyleninae. SHILAP (Revista de Lepidopterología). 43(170): 181-188.
- Kravchenko V.D. & Speidel W. & Witt T. & Revay E.E. & Mooser J. & Ronkay L. & Müller G.C. 2015. An annotated checklist of the Noctuoidea of Jordan with remarks on ecology, phenology and zoogeography. Part IV: Hadeninae (Lepidoptera, Noctuidae). SHILAP (Revista de Lepidopterología). 43(171): 341-347.
- Schintlmeister A. & Witt T. 2015. The Notodontidae of South-Africa including Swaziland and Lesotho (Lepidoptera). Proc. Mus. Witt. 2: 1-288.
- Speidel W. & Hausmann A. & Müller C.G. & Kravchenko V.D. & Mooser J. & Witt T.J. & Khallaayoune K. & Prosser S. & Hebert P.D.N. 2015. Taxonomy 2.0: Next Generation-Sequencing of old type specimens supports the description of two new species of the Lasiocampa decolorata group from Morocco (Lepidoptera, Lasiocampidae). Zootaxa. 3999(3): 401–412.
- Witt T. & Kravchenko V.D. & Speidel W. & Mooser J. & Revay E.E. & Müller G.C. 2015. An annotated checklist of the Noctuoidea of Jordan with remarks on ecology, phenology and zoogeography. Part II: Cuculliinae & Oncocnemidinae (Lepidoptera: Noctuidae). Shilap. 43(169): 41-47.
- Witt T. & Kravchenko V.D. & Speidel W. & Mooser J. & Revay E.E. & Müller G.C. 2015. An annotated checklist of the Noctuoidea of Jordan with remarks on ecology, phenology and zoogeography. Part I: Erebidae & Euteliidae (Lepidoptera: Noctuidae). Shilap. 43(169): 5-14.
- Yakovlev R.V. & Poltavsky A.N. & Ilyina E.V. & Shchurov V.I. & Witt & T. 2015. Cossidae (Lepidoptera) of the Russian Caucasus with the description of a new species. Zootaxa. 4044(2): 270-288.
- Yakovlev R.V. & Witt T. 2015. Meharia ganslmeieri sp. nov. – a new Cossidae species from Zambia (Lepidoptera). Zootaxa. 4032(3): 319-321.
- Yakovlev R. & Pljustch I.G. & Skrylnik Y. & Pak O. & Witt T. 2015. The Cossidae (Lepidoptera) of Afghanistan with description of three new species and special notes on the fauna of Bande-Amir National Park. Zootaxa. 3990(1): 41–72.
- Yakovlev R. & Witt T. 2015. Orientozeuzera martinii sp. nov., a new species of Carpenter-Moths (Lepidoptera: Cossidae) from Borneo. Zootaxa. 3990(1): 138–140.
- Yakovlev R. & Witt T. 2015. Azygophleps brehmi Yakovlev & Witt sp. nov. – a new Carpenter-Moth (Lepidoptera, Cossidae) from Ethiopia. Russian Entomological Journal. 25(1): 71-73.
- Greifenstein T. & Thöny H. & Witt T. & Speidel W. 2014. Eine Neue Art der Gattung Brachyglene HERRICH-SCHÄFFER, 1855 aus Brasilien (Lepidoptera, Notodontidae).17.Beitrag zur Heteroceren-Fauna Brasiliens. Entomofauna. 35(25): 541-552.
- Hofmann A. & Tarmann G.M. & Witt T.J. 2014. Erinnerungen an Karl-Heinz Wiegel (8.2.1918 - 4 July 2003). NachrBl. bayer. Ent. 63(3/4): 74-89.
- Schintlmeister A. & Witt T. 2014. Nephodonta cognata sp. n., eine übersehene Notodontide aus Taiwan (Lepidoptera: Notodontidae). Entomofauna. 35(23): 525-532.
- Witt T. & Schintlmeister A. 2014. Eine neue Lymantride aus Sulawesi, Belinda zoe gen. n. et sp. n. (Lepidoptera: Lymantriidae). Entomofauna. 35(24): 533-540.
- Schintlmeister A. & Witt T.J. 2013. Polymona schellhorni sp nov., a new lymantrid moth from Jordania (Lepidoptera: Lymantriidae). Zootaxa. 3745(2): 296-298.
- Saldaitis A. & Ivinskis P. & Witt T. & Pekarsky O. 2012. Review of the Eospilarctia yuennanica group (Lepidoptera, Erebidae, Arctiinae) from the Indo – Himalayan region, with description of two new species and one subspecies. ZooKeys. 204: 53–70.
- Solovyev A.V. & Witt T.J. 2011. Two new species of Pseudiragoides Solovyev & Witt, 2009 from China (Lepidoptera, Limacodidae). Entomologische Zeitschrift. 121(1): 36–38.
- Zolotuhin V.V. & Pugaev S.N. & Sinjaev V.V. & Witt T. 2011. The biology of Mirinidae with description of preimaginal instars of Mirina confucius Zolotuhin & Witt, 2000 (Lepidoptera, Mirinidae). Tinea. 21(4): 189-198.
- Diller E. & Gusenleitner F. & Schacht W. & Schwarz M. & Witt T. 2010. Die Zeitschrift Entomofauna - 30 Jahre erfolgreiche Kooperation. Entomologica Austriaca. 17: 171-194.
- Gyulai P. & László M.G. & Pekarsky O. & Peregovits L. & Ronkay G. & Ronkay L. & Szabóky C. & Varga Z. & Witt T.J. 2010. Macrolepidoptera of Hungary. Heterocera Press, Budapest. 1-253.
- Kravchenko V.D. & Matov A. & Speidel W. & Rybalov L. & Seyoum E. & Beredin S. & Negeri M. & Witt T. & Mooser J. & Müller G.C. 2010. Contributions to the Lepidoptera fauna of Ethiopia: Catocalinae (Noctuidae). Lepidoptera Novae (Gainesville). 3(1): 41-52.
- László G.M. & Ronkay G. & Witt T.J. 2010. Contribution to the Nolinae (Lepidoptera, Noctuidae) fauna of North Thailand (Plates 1-11). Esperiana. 15: 7-125.
- Müller G.C. & Kravchenko V.D. & Revay E. & Speidel W. & Mooser J. & Beredin S. & Witt T. 2010. The Nolidae of Jordan: Distribution, Phenology and Ecology. Entomofauna Zeitschrift für Entomologie. 31(4): 69-84.
- Witt T.J. & Solovyev A.V. 2010. A new species of Tanvia Solovyev & Witt, 2009 from Thailand (Lepidoptera: Limacodidae). Entomologische Zeitschrift, Stuttgart. 120(6): 257-258.
- Kravchenko V.D. & Witt T. & Speidel W. & Mooser J. & Junnila A. & Muller G.C. 2009. The Earidinae and Chloeophorinae (Lepidoptera: Noctuoidea, Nolidae) of Israel: distribution, phenology and ecology. Russian Entomological Journal. 18(2): 1-5.
- Kravchenko V.D. & Witt T. & Speidel W. & Mooser J. & Junnila A. & Müller G.C. 2009. The Eariadinae and Chloephorinae (Lepidoptera: Noctuoidea, Nolidae) of Israel: Distribution, Phenology and Ecology. Russian Entomological Journal. 18(2): 117-121.
- Solovyev A.V. & Witt T.J. 2009. The Limacodidae of Vietnam (Lepidoptera). Entomofauna Supplement. 16: 33–229.
- Witt T.J. & Behounek G. & Speidel W. & Sinyaev V. 2009. Additional data for Platychasma elegantula (Lepidoptera, Notodontidae). Entomofauna. 39(9): 129-136.
- Witt T.J. & Nässig W. & Ignatyev N.N. 2009. Two new species of the genus Ganisa Walker,1855 from Sulawesi and Flores, Indonesia (Lepidoptera: Eupterotidae). Entomofauna. 30(26): 453-464.
- Yakovlev R.V. & Witt T.J. 2009. The Carpenter Moths (Lepidoptera, Cossidae) of Vietnam. Entomofauna Supplement. 16: 11-32.
- Zolotuhin V.V. & Witt T.J. 2009. The Bombycidae of Vietnam (Lepidoptera). Entomofauna Supplement. 16: 231-272.
- Kravchenko V.D. & Speidel W. & Witt T.J. & Mooser J. & Seplyarsky V.N. & Saldaitis A. & Junnila A. & Müller G.S. 2008. A new species of Catocala from Israel (Lepidoptera, Noctuidae). Acta Zoologica Lithuanica. 18(2): 127–129.
- Müller G.C. & Kravchenko V.D. & Witt T. & Junnila A. & Mooser J. & Saldataitis A. & Reshöft K. & Ivinskis P. & Zahiri R. & Speidel W. 2008. New underwing taxa of the section of Catocala lesbia Christoph, 1887 (Lepidoptera, Noctuidae). Acta Zoologica Lituanica. 18(1): 30-49.
- Ignatiev N. & Witt T. 2007. A review of Eilema Hübner, 1819 of Russia and adjacent territories. Part 1. The Eilema griseola (Hübner, 1803) species group (Arctiidae: Lithosiinae). Nota lepid. 30(1): 25-43.
- Kravchenko V.D..Fibiger M. & Hausmann A. & Müller G.C. 2007. Noctuidae in: Müller, G.C., Kravchenko, V.D., Hausmann, A., Speidel, W., Mooser, J., Witt, T.J. (eds.) The Lepidoptera of Israel.. -name-. 2: 1-320.
- Kravchenko V.D..Fibiger M. & Hausmann A. & Müller G.C. 2007. Erebidae in: Müller, G.C., Kravchenko, V.D., Hausmann, A., Speidel, W., Mooser, J., Witt, T.J. (eds.) The Lepidoptera of Israel. -name-. 1(-num-): 1-167.
- Kravchenko V.D. & Ronkay L. & Speidel W. & Witt T. & Fibiger M. & Rybalov L. & Dawd M. & Junnila A. & Müller G.C. 2007. Contribution to the Noctuidae (Lepidoptera) fauna of Ethiopia. Atalanta. 38(3/4): 385-393.
- László G.M. & Ronkay G. & Witt T. 2007. New taxa in the Meganola scripta (MOORE, 1888) species group and in the genus Dialithoptera HAMPSON, 1900.Investigations on Asian Nolidae IV (Lepidoptera, Nolidae). Entomofauna. 28(2): 17-32.
- László G.M. & Ronkay G. & Witt T. 2007. New species of the Meganola nitida (HAMPSON, 1894) species-group. Investigations on Asian Nolidae V (Lepidoptera, Nolidae). Entomofauna. 28(14): 157-172.
- László Gy.M. & Ronkay G. & Ronkay L. & Witt T. 2007. The Thyatiridae of Eurasia including the Sundaland and New Guinea (Lepidoptera). Esperiana. 13: 1-683.
- Müller G.C. & Kravchenko V.D. & Ronkay L. & Speidel W. & Witt T. & Mooser J. & Junnila A. & Zilli A. 2007. A new species of Odontelia Hampson, 1905 from Israel and its ecology (Lepidoptera: Noctuidae, Hadeninae). Entomologische Zeitschrift. Stuttgart. 117(6): 243-247.
- Speidel W. & Witt T.J. 2007. A new genus of Galleriinae from South-East Asia (Lepidoptera, Pyralidae). Entomofauna. 28(17): 201-212.
- Witt T.J. & Kravchenko V.D. & Speidel W. & Mooser J. & Junnila A. & Müller G.C. 2007. A new Amata species from Israel (Arctiidae, Syntominae). Nota Lepidopterologica. 30(2): 367-373.
- Witt T.J. & Pugaev S.N. 2007. Salassa belinda sp.n.– a new Nepalese Saturniid species from the lola WESTWOOD, 1847-group (Lepidoptera, Saturniidae). Entomofauna Monographie. 1: 1-11.
- Witt T.J. & Speidel W. 2007. Eine neue Art der Gattung Polymona Walker, 1855, aus Algerien (Lepidoptera, Lymantriidae). Entomofauna. 28(3): 33-44.
- Witt T.J. & Speidel W. 2007. Eine neue Rodneya-Art aus Pakistan (Lepidoptera, Notodontidae). Entomofauna. 28(13): 149-156.
- Yakovlev R.V. & Witt T.J. 2007. Dyspessa aphrodite sp.n. from Greece (Cossidae). Nota Lepidopterologica. 30(2): 411-414.
- Zolotuhin V.V. & Witt T.J. 2007. A Revision of the Genus Pyrosis OBERTHÜR, 1880 (= Bhima MOORE, 1888) (Lepidoptera, Lasiocampidae). Nachr. entomol. Ver. Apollo Supplement. 19: 1-31.
- Zolotuhin V.V. & Witt T.J. 2007. A new genus and a new species of the Lasiocampidae (Lepidoptera) from Pakistan. Nachr.entomol.Ver.Apollo Supplement. 19: 32-34.
- László G.M. & Ronkay G. & Witt T. 2006. Description of a New Genus and Five New Species of Nolinae from Thailand. Investigations on Asian Nolidae III.(Lepidoptera, Nolidae). Entomofauna. 27(21): 265-276.
- Müller G.C. & Gyulay M. & Ronkay G. & Ronkay L. & Speidel W. & Kravchenko V.D. & Mooser J. & Witt T. 2006. The Drepanoidea of Israel: Distribution, Phenology and Ecology (Lepidoptera: Thyatiridae and Drepanidae), with description of a new species. Entomofauna. 27: 57-76.
- Müller G.C. & Kravchenko V.D. & Chikatunov V. & Ortal R. & Orlova O. & Chuang L. & Witt T. & Speidel W. & Mooser J. & Hausmann A. 2006. General aspects of the Israeli Light-trap Network concerning Coleoptera. Esperiana. 12: 283-290.
- Müller G.C. & Kravchenko V.D. & Speidel W. & Hausmann A. & Ortal R. & Miller M.A. & Orlova O.B. & Witt T.J. 2006. Distribution, phenology, ecology, behaviour and issues of conservation of the Israeli tiger moth, Olepa schleini Witt et al., 2005 (Lepidoptera: Arctiidae). Mitt. Münch. Ent. Ges. 95: 19-29.
- Müller G.C. & László G.M. & Ronkay G. & Ronkay L. & Speidel W. & Kravchenko V.D. & Mooser J. & Witt T. 2006. The Drepanoidea of Israel: Distribution, Phenology and Ecology (Lepidoptera: Thyatiridae and Drepanidae), with description of a new species. Entomofauna. 27(4): 57-76.
- Witt T. 2006. Eine neue Dalailama STAUDINGER, 1896 - Art (Lepidoptera, Bombycidae) aus China. Entomofauna. 27(3): 45-56.
- Witt T. & Speidel W. 2006. Eine neue Calpenia-Art aus China (Lepidoptera, Arctiidae). Entomofauna. 27(2): 37-44.
- Eitschberger U. & Kravchenko V.D. & Chuang Li & Speidel W. & Witt T. & Müller G.C. 2005. Zwei neue Hemaris Dalman, 1816-Arten (Subgenus Mandarina Eitschberger, Danner & Surholt, 1998) aus dem Nahen Osten (Lepidoptera, Sphingidae). Atalanta. 36(1/2): 199-208.
- Eitschberger U. & Kravchenko V. & Li C. & Speidel W. & Witt T. & Müller G.C. 2005. Zwei neue Hemaris Dalman, 1816 - Arten (Subgenus Mandarina Eitschberger, Danner & Surholt, 1998) aus dem Nahen Osten (Lepidoptera, Sphingidae). Atalanta, Würzburg. 36(1/2): 199-207.
- László G.M. & Ronkay G. & Witt T.J. 2005. New and poorly known species of Nolidae from SE Asia. Investigations on Asian Nolidae II (Lepidoptera, Nolidae). Entomofauna. 26(11): 205-224.
- Müller G.C. & Eitschberger U. & Kravchenko V.D. & Li C. & Miller M.A. & Orlova O. & Speidel W. & Witt T.J. 2005. The Sphingidae of Jordan: Distribution, Phenology and Ecology. Atalanta. 36(1/2): 209-221.
- Müller G.C. & Eitschberger U. & Kravchenko V.D. & Li C. & Speidel W. & Witt T.J. 2005. Zwei neue Hemaris Dalman, 1816 – Arten (Subgenus Mandarina Eitschberger, DANNER & SURHOLT, 1998) aus dem Nahen Osten (Lepidoptera, Sphingidae). Atalanta. 36(1/2): 199-207.
- Müller G.C. & Kravchenko V.D. & Chuang Li & Eitschberger U. & Hausmann A. & Miller M. & Orlova O. & Ortal R. & Speidel W. & Witt T. 2005. The Hawk Moths of Israel: Distribution, Phenology and Ecology (Lepidoptera: Sphingidae). Atalanta. 36(1/2): 222-236.
- Müller G.C. & Kravchenko V.D. & Chuang Li & Eitschberger U. & Miller M. & Orlova O. & Speidel W. & Witt T. 2005. The Sphingidae of Jordan: Distribution, Phenology & Ecology. Atalanta. 36(1/2): 209-220.
- Müller G.C. & Kravchenko V.D. & Chuang Li & Mooser J. & Orlova O. & Speidel W. & Witt T. 2005. The Nolidae (Lepidoptera) of Israel. Atalanta. 36(1/2): 248-256.
- Müller G.C. & Kravchenko V.D. & Chuang Li & Mooser J. & Phillips A. & Speidel W. & Orlova O. & Witt T.J. 2005. The Notodontidae (Lepidoptera) of Israel. Atalanta. 36(1/2): 237-247.
- Müller G.C. & Kravchenko V.D. & Li C. & Eitschberger U. & Hausmann A. & Miller M.A. & Orlova O. & Ortal R. & Speidel W. & Witt T.J. 2005. The Hawk Moths of Israel: Distribution, Phenology and Ecology. Atalanta. 36(1/2): 222-236.
- Müller G.C. & Kravchenko V.D. & Li C. & Mooser J. & Orlova O.B. & Speidel W. & Witt T. 2005. The Nolidae (Lepidoptera) of Israel. Atalanta, Würzburg. 36(1/2): 248-256.
- Müller G.C. & Kravchenko V.D. & Li C. & Mooser J. & Speidel W. & Witt T.J. 2005. The Nolidae (Lepidoptera) of Israel. Atalanta. 36(1/2): 248-256.
- Müller G.C. & Kravchenko V.D. & Speidel W. & Hausmann A. & Orlova O.B. & Toledo J. & Witt T. 2005. Description of early stages and laboratory breeding of Olepa schleini Witt et al., 2005 (Lepidoptera: Arctiidae). Mitteilungen der Münchener Entomologischen Gesellschaft. 95: 11-18.
- Müller G.C. & Kravchenko V.D. & Speidel W. & Hausmann A. & Ortal R. & Miller M. & Orlova O. & Witt T. 2005. The distribution, phenology, ecology, behaviour and conservation issues of the new Israeli tiger moth Olepa schleini (Lepidoptera: Arctiidae). Mitteilungen der Münchener Entomologischen Gesellschaft. 95: 19-30.
- Müller G.C. & Kravchenko V. & Li C. & Eitschberger U. & Miller M.A. & Orlova O. & Speidel W. & Witt T. 2005. The Sphingidae of Jordan: Distribution, Phenology and. Atalanta, Würzburg. 36(1/2): 209-221.
- Witt T.J. & Müller G.C. & Kravchenko V.D. & Miller M.A. & Hausmann A. & Speidel W. 2005. A new Olepa species from Israel (Lepidoptera: Arctiidae). NachrBl. bayer. Ent. 54(3/4): 101-115.
- Zolotuhin V.V. & Witt T.J. 2005. Contribution to the knowledge of Indonesian Lasiocampidae (Lepidoptera). Tinea. 18(5): 59-68.
- Freina J. de. & Witt T. 2004. Paidia elegantia spec.nov., eine neue Flechtenbärenart aus dem südlichen Iran (Lepidoptera, Arctiidae, Lithosiinae). Atalanta. 36(1/2): 109-113,169-170.
- Ivinskis P. & Saldatis A. & Witt T. 2004. Acerbia cornuta spec.nov.and Acerbia seitzi micropuncta subspec.nov., (Lepidoptera, Arctiidae) from Central Asia. Atalanta. 35(3/4): 415-425.
- László G.M. & Ronkay G. & Witt T. 2004. New Species in the Genus Sarbena WALKER, 1862 (Lepidoptera, Nolidae).Investigations on Asian Nolidae I. Entomofauna. 25: 281-294.
- Saldaitis A. & Ivinskis P. & Witt T. 2004. Acerbia cornuta spec. nov. and Acerbia seitzi micropuncta subspec. nov. from Central Asia (Lepidoptera, Arctiidae). Atalanta (Marktleuthen). 35(3-4): 415-425, 488-491.
- Zolotuhin V.V. & Witt T.J. 2004. New and little-known species of the Lasiocampidae (Lepidoptera) from China. Tinea. 18(1): 36-42.
- Saldaitis A. & Ivinskis P. & Witt T. 2003. A new species, Acerbia churkini sp.n.(Lepidoptera, Arctiidae) from Kirghizia. Helios. 4: 291–300.
- Freina J. de. & Witt T. 2001. Zygaenoidea: Zygaenidae. In: Freina J. de.& Witt T (eds.), Die Bombyces und Sphinges der Westpalaearktis (Insecta, Lepidoptera), Band 3 (pp. 1–575), Edition Forschung & Wissenschaft Verlag GmbH, München.
- Freina J. de. & Witt T. 2001. Sesiidae. In: Freina J. de.& Witt T (eds.), Die Bombyces und Sphinges der Westpalaearktis (Insecta, Lepidoptera), Band 4 (pp. 1–432), Edition Forschung & Wissenschaft Verlag GmbH, München.
- Zolotuhin V.V. & Witt T.J. 2000. Moths of Vietnam with special reference to Mt.Fan-si-pan, Teil 2. The Camptolominae of Vietnam and adjacent territories (Lepidoptera, Noctuidae). Entomofauna Supplement. 11: 1-12.
- Zolotuhin V.V. & Witt T.J. 2000. Moths of Vietnam with special reference to Mt.Fan-si-pan", Teil 2. The Mirinidae of Vietnam. Entomofauna Supplement. 11: 13-24.
- Zolotuhin V.V. & Witt T.J. 2000. Moths of Vietnam with special reference to Mt.Fan-si-pan", Teil 2. The Lasiocampidae of Vietnam. Entomofauna Supplement. 11: 25-104.
- Zolotuhin V.V. & Witt T. 2000. Lasiocampidae of Nepal.Adenda and corrigenda to "Moths of Nepal", Parts 1-5.- Moths of Nepal. Tinea (Suppl.), part 6. 153-163.
- Zolotuhin V.V. & Treadaway C.J. & Witt T.J. 1998. The Lasiocampidae (Lepidoptera) of the Philippines. Nachr.entomol.Ver.Apollo (Frankfurt am Main), Suppl. 17: 133-222.
- Freina J.J. de & Witt T.J. 1994. Zur Kenntnis der Gattung Lithosarctia Daniel, 1954 mit Beschreibung zweier neuer Taxa (Lepidoptera, Arctüdae). Atalanta (Dezember 1994). 25(3/4): 535-542.
- Witt T. 1994. List of lepidopterological publications of Dr.Rupprecht Bender (in Zusammenarbeit mit W.A.NÄSSIG und R.SUMMKELLER). Heteroc.Sumatr. 7(2): 111-112.
- Witt T. 1993. Ein geographisch interessanter Neufund von Moffatia plumicauda Moore,1890 (Lepidoptera, Psychidae). Entomofauna. 14(25): 417-418.
- Freina J. de. & Witt T. 1990. Cossoidea: Cossidae, Limacodidae, Megalopygidae.Hepialoidea: Hepialidae.Pyraloidea: Thyridae.Zygaenoidea: Epipyropidae, Heterogynidae. In: Freina J. de.& Witt T (eds.), Die Bombyces und Sphinges der Westpalaearktis (Insecta, Lepidoptera), Band 2 (pp. 1–140), Edition Forschung & Wissenschaft Verlag GmbH, München.
- Freina J. de. & Witt T. 1990. Somabrachys aegrotus (Klug,1830) und Dyspessa emilia (Staudinger 1878), zwei neue Bombyces-Arten für die europäische Lepidopterenfauna (Lepidoptera: Megalopygidae, Cossidae). Ent.Z.Frankf.a.M. 100(8): 151-152.
- Freina J. de. & Witt T. 1990. Zur Systematik des paneremisch verbreiteten Dyspessa-foeda-vaulogeri-Komplexes mit Beschreibung einer neuen Unterart aus Südostspanien. NachrBl. bayer. Ent. 39(1): 20-25.
- Freina J. de. & Witt T. 1990. Exzeptionelle und partielle Parthenogenese bei Heterogyniden.Beschreibung der ersten Larvalstände und des Weibchens von Heterogynis andalusica thomas Zilli, 1987 (Lepidoptera, Heterogynidae). Nota lepid. 13: 2-3.
- Freina J. de. & Witt T. 1989. Kritische Betrachtung der im Genus Stygia Latreille, 1803 zusammengefaßten Taxa (Lepidoptera, Cossidae). Mitt. Münch. Ent. Ges. 79: 119-125.
- Witt T. 1988. In Memoriam Dr. phil. Walter Forster (1910-1986). Nota lepid. 11(2): 90-98.
- Witt T. 1988. Friedrich Reichsgraf von Hartig (1900-1980). Entomofauna. 9(14): 317-330.
- Freina J. de. & Witt T. 1987. 32.Vorarbeit. Über Trennungsmerkmale und die Verbreitung von Cilix glaucata (Scopoli 1763) und Cilix asiatica 0.Bang-Haas 1907 (Lepidoptera, Drepanidae). NachrBl.bayer.ent. 36(l): 10-14.
- Freina J. de. & Witt T. 1987. Noctuoidea: Nolidae, Arctiidae, Syntomidae, Dilobidae, Lymantriidae, Notodontidae, Thaumetipoeidae, Thyretidae.Sphingoidea: Sphingidae.Geometridoidea: Axiidae, Drepanidae, Thyatiridae. Bombycoidea: Bombycidae, Brahmaeidae, Endromidae, Lasiocampidae, Lemoniidae, Saturniidae. In: Freina J. de.& Witt T (eds.), Die Bombyces und Sphinges der Westpalaearktis (Insecta, Lepidoptera), Band 1 (pp. 1–708), Edition Forschung & Wissenschaft Verlag GmbH, München.
- Freina J. de. & Witt T. 1987. Stoermeriana omana sp.n., eine bisher unbekannte Lasiocampidae-Art aus Südarabien (Lepidoptera, Lasiocampidae). Mitt.Münch.Ent.Ges. 78: 187-190.
- Witt T. 1987. Bibliographie des Lepidopterologen und Faunistikers Josef Thurner, Klagenfurt (Insecta, Lepidoptera). Entomofauna. 8(11): 221-224.
- Witt T. 1987. Franz Daniel (1895-1985). Entomofauna. 8(25): 353-359.
- Witt T. 1987. Lepidopterologische Sammelergebnisse der Reisen Franz Daniels nach Istrien in den Jahren 1965 mit 1971 (Lepidoptera, Bombyces et Sphinges). Entomofauna. 8(28): 413-440.
- Freina J.J. de & Witt T.J. 1985. Taxonomische Veränderungen bei den Bombyces und Sphinges Europas und Nordwestafrikas). Zur Nomenklatur und Systematik von Rhyparioides metelkanus (Lederer, 1861) (vorgeschlagen als nomen conservandum) und Rhyparioides metelkanus flavidus (Bremer, 1861) (Lepidoptera, Arctiidae IX). NachrBl. bayer. Ent. 34(4): 115-117.
- Freina J.J. de & Witt T.J. 1985. Taxonomische Veränderungen bei den Bombyces und Sphinges Europas und Nordwestafrikas. Zur Taxonomie der Gattung Setina Schrank, 1802, auf der Iberischen Halbinsel und in den Pyrenäen mit Neubeschreibung der Taxa Setina flavicans pseudoirrorella ssp. n. und Setina cantabrica sp. n. (Lepidoptera, Arctiidae, Lithosiinae, Endrosini). Entomofauna. 6(16): 205-220.
- Freina J. de. & Aussem B. & Witt T. 1985. 28.Vorarbeit. Zur Situation der Gattung Paidia Hübner,[1819] 1816 in Europa und Nordwestafrika (Lepidoptera, Arctiidae VII). Atalanta (April 1985). 16: 109-113.
- Freina J. de. & Witt T. 1985. 16.Vorarbeit.Über Taleporiinae Tutt 1900 (Lepidoptera: Psychidae III). Ent.Z.Frankf.a.M.(l April 1985)(Diese Arbeit betrifft BandII). 95(7): 84-90.
- Freina J. de. & Witt T. 1985. Arctia weigerti sp.n., eine neue Bärenspinnerart aus dem Karakorum (Lepidoptera, Arctiidae). Nota lepid. 8(1): 21-24.
- Freina J. de. & Witt T. 1985. 30.Vorarbeit.Helianthocampa gen.nov.; Traumatocampa galaica (Palanca Soler et al.1982) comb.nov.et syn.nov.(Lepidoptera, Thaumetopoeidae, Thaumetopoeinae). Nota lepid (30 Juni 1985). 8(2): 175-183.
- Freina J. de. & Witt T. 1985. 29.Vorarbeit.Zur Taxonomie der Gattung Setina Schrank, 1802, auf der Iberischen Halbinsel und in den Pyrenäen mit Neubeschreibung der Taxa Setina flavicans pseudoirrorella ssp.n.und Setina cantabrica sp.n.(Lepidoptera, Arctiidae, Lithosiinae, Endrosini). Entomofauna (20 August 1985). 6(16): 205-219.
- Freina J. de. & Witt T. 1985. 31.Vorarbeit.Zur Nomenklatur und Systematik von Rhyparioides metelkanus (Lederer, 1861) (vorgeschlagen als nomen conservandum) und Rhyparioides metelkanus flavidus (Bremer, 1861) (Lepidoptera, Arctiidae VIII). NachrBl.bayer.ent (15 Dezember 1985). 34: 115-117.
- Witt T. 1985. Bombyces und Sphinges aus Korea, III. (Lepidoptera: Notodontidae, Thyatiridae, Limacodidae, Sesiidae, Cossidae). Folia Entomologica Hungarica. 46(2): 195-210.
- Witt T. 1985. Neue und bemerkenswerte Heterocerennachweise aus Griechenland (Lepidoptera, Arctiidae, Lymantriidae, Thyatiridae, Psychidae). NachrBl. bayer. Ent. 34(2): 47-49.
- Witt T. 1985. Ocneria prolai Hartig, 1963 (Lepidoptera: Lymantriidae): a second record from Yugoslavia. Entomologist's Gaz. 36: 104.
- Witt T. 1985. Bombyces und Sphinges aus Korea, II (Zygaenidae, Ctenuchidae, Nolidae, Arctiidae, Lymantriidae, Lasiocampidae, Bombycidae, Cyclidiidae, Drepanidae, Saturniidae). Folia Ent.Hung. XLVI(2): 179-210.
- Freina J.J. de. & Ströhle M. & Witt T.J. 1984. 23. Vorarbeit. Taxonomische Veränderungen bei den Bombyces und Sphinges Europas und Nordwestafrikas. Untersuchungen zur Systematik der westpaläarktischen Populationen des Teia dubia (Tauscher, 1806). Entomofauna (20 Oktober 1984). 5(25): 287-298.
- Freina J.J. de & Witt T.J. 1984. Taxonomische Veränderungen bei den Bombyces und Sphinges Europas und Nordwestafrikas. Revision des Macrothylacia rubi-digramma-Komplexes (Lepidoptera:, Lasiocampidae V). Nota Lepidopterologica. 7(1): 27—38.
- Freina J.J. de & Witt T.J. 1984. Taxonomische Veränderungen bei den Bombyces und Sphinges Europas und Nordwestafrikas. Über Taleporia improvisella (Staudinger, 1859) und Taleporia pseudoimprovisella sp. n. (Lepidoptera, Psychidae II). Entomofauna. 5(13): 153-164.
- Freina J. de. & Witt T. 1984. II.Vorarbeit. Untersuchungen zur Bestätigung des Artrechtes von Narycia monilifera (Geoffroy, 1785) und Narycia astrella (Herrich- Schäffer, 1851). NachrBl. bayer. ent (15 Februar 1984)(Diese Arbeitbetrifft BandII). 33: 19-25.
- Freina J. de. & Witt T. 1984. 13.Vorarbeit.Revision des Macrothylacia rubi-digramma-Komplexes (Lepidoptera, Lasiocampidae V). Nota lepid.(31.März 1984). 7(1): 27-38.
- Freina J. de. & Witt T. 1984. Setina pontica stat.nov., die Flechtenbärenart aus dem Nordostanatolisch-kaukasischen Raum (Lepidoptera, Lithosiidae). NachrBl. bayer. Ent. 33(2): 50-57.
- Freina J. de. & Witt T. 1984 [1983]. 10.Vorarbeit. Taxonomische und zoogeographische Studien an Cymbalophora rivularis (Menetries, 1832) (Lepidoptera: Arctiidae). Mitt. ArbGem. öst. Ent. (Mai 1984). 35(3/4): 101-105.
- Freina J. de. & Witt T. 1984. 22. Vorarbeit. 23. Vorarbeit. Taxonomische Veränderungen bei den Bombyces und Sphinges Europas und Nordwestafrikas. Laelia raczi de Laever, 1980, ein Synonym zu Laelia coenosa (Hübner, [1808]) (Lepidoptera, Lymantriidae). Atalanta (Juni 1984). XV: 147-152.
- Freina J. de. & Witt T. 1984. 15.Vorarbeit.Über Taleporia improvisella (Staudinger, 1859) und Taleporia pseudoimprovisella sp.n.(Lepidoptera, Psychidae II). Entomofauna (15 Juni 1984)(Diese Arbeit betrifft BandII). 5(13): 153-163.
- Freina J. de. & Witt T. 1984. 19.Vorarbeit.(Lepidoptera, Noctuoidea: Nolidae l). Nota lepid.(30 Juni 1984). 7(2): 132-142.
- Freina J. de. & Witt T. 1984. 18. Vorarbeit. Probleme bei der Bewertung niederer taxonomischer Kategorien am Beispiel von Chelis maculosa(Gerning, 1780)(Lepidoptera: Arctiidae). Ent. Z. Frankf.a.M.(l August 1984). 94(15): 209-216.
- Freina J. de. & Witt T. 1984. 14.Vorarbeit. Modifications taxinomiques dans les Sphingides et Syntomides d'Europe et de l'Afrique du Nord occidentale (Lepidoptera). Alexanor (15 August 1984). 13(6): 283-288.
- Freina J. de. & Witt T. 1984. 21.Vorarbeit. Über die Berechtigung von Unterarten bei Spiris striata (Linnaeus, 1758) und Coscinia cribraria (Linnaeus, 1758).Ergebnisse einer Teilrevision. Nota lepid (30 September 1984). 7(3): 223-236.
- Freina J. de. & Witt T. 1984. 17.Vorarbeit. Über die phänotypische Variabilität von Phragmatobia fuliginosa (Linnaeus, 1758) (Lepidoptera, Arctiidae). Entomofauna (l Oktober 1984). 5(21): 251-255.
- Freina J. de. & Witt T. 1984. 20. Vorarbeit.Antennola gen.n.; Antennola impura (Mann, 1862) comb.n.neu für Europa (Lepidoptera, Noiidae II). Entomofauna (10 Oktober 1984). 5(23): 267-272.
- Freina J. de. & Witt T. 1984. 25.Vorarbeit. Taxonomische Veränderungen bei den Bombyces und Sphinges Europas und Nordwestafrikas. Kritische Betrachtung der Gattung Albarracina Staudinger, 1883 (Lepidoptera, Lymantriidae IV). Atalanta (Oktober 1984). XV: 372-376.
- Freina J. de. & Witt T. 1984. 24.Vorarbeit. Zwei neue Arctiidaegattungen für den westpaläarktischen Faunenbereich: Watsonarctia gen.n.und Maurica gen.n.(Lepidoptera, Arctiidae). Entomofauna (5 November 1984). 5(28): 323-334.
- Freina J. de. & Witt T. 1984. 26.Vorarbeit.Nachweis der Konspezifität von Euproctis charmetanti (Vuillot, 1890), Euproctis boulifa Dumont, 1922 und Euproctis durandi (Lucas, 1926) mit Euproctis chrysophaea (Walker,1865) (Lepidoptera, Lymantriidae V). Nota lepid (31 Dezember 1984). 7(4): 323-329.
- Freina J. de. & Witt T. 1984. 27.Vorarbeit.Lepidoptera, Noctuoidea: Arctiidae VI. Nota lepid (31 Dezember 1984). 7(4): 330-336.
- Witt T. 1984. Bibliographie des Psychidae-Spezialisten Leo Sieder, Klagenfurt (Lepidoptera: Psychidae). Entomofauna. 5(4): 45-49.
- Witt T. 1984. Der Erstnachweis von Pelosia obtusa (HERRICH-SCHÄFFER, 1852) für die Iberische Halbinsel: Pelosia obtusa pavlasi ssp.n.sowie ein Abriß über die bisher bekannte Verbreitung der Art.(Lepidoptera: Arctiidae, Lithosiinae). Entomofauna. 5(10): 125-136.
- Witt T. 1984. Eilema lutarella diluta (ROTHSCHILD) (Lepidoptera: Lithosiidae) new for Morocco. Entomologist's Gazette. 35: 232.
- Freina J. de. & Witt T. 1983. 2.Vorarbeit (Lepidoptera, Notodontidae l). Ent.2 (l.Februar 1983). 93: 21-29.
- Freina J. de. & Witt T. 1983. 3.Vorarbeit (Lepidoptera, Notodontidae II). Entomofauna (15 Februar 1983). 4(3): 61-74.
- Freina J. de. & Witt T. 1983. 6.Vorarbeit. Taxonomische Veränderungen bei den Bombyces und Sphinges Europas und Nordwestafrikas. (Lepidoptera: Notodontidae III). Mitt. ent. Ges. Basel (März 1983). 33(1): 3-9.
- Freina J. de. & Witt T. 1983. 4. Vorarbeit. Taxonomische Veränderungen bei den Bombyces und Sphinges Europas und Nordwestafrikas. Dendrolimus pini (Linne, 1767) und ihre Unterarten (Lepidoptera, Lasiocampidae II). Atalanta (Mai 1983). XIV: 31-49.
- Freina J. de. & Witt T. 1983. 5. Vorarbeit. Taxonomische Veränderungen bei den Bombyces und Sphinges Europas und Nordwestafrikas. (Lepidoptera: Lemoniidae, Lasiocampidae l). Nota lepid. 6: 2-3.
- Freina J. de. & Witt T. 1983. Zwei neue Lycaenidae-Arten aus Türkisch Kurdistan: Lysandra dezina sp.n.und Polyommatus ciloicus sp.n.(Lepidoptera, Lycaenidae). Entomofauna. 4(14): 181-197.
- Freina J. de. & Witt T. 1983. 7.Vorarbeit. Taxonomische Veränderungen bei den Bombyces und Sphinges Europas und Nordwestafrikas(Lepidoptera: Endromidae, Saturniidae, Drepanidae, Lasiocampidae III). Ent. Z. Frankf.a.M.(15 Juli 1983). 93(14): 193-204.
- Freina J. de. & Witt T. 1983. 8.Vorarbeit. Taxonomische Veränderungen bei den Bombyces und Sphinges Europas und Nordwestafrikas (Lepidoptera, Lymantriidae). NachrBl. bayer. Ent. (15 Oktober 1983). 32(3): 81-88.
- Freina J. de. & Witt T. 1983. Taxonomische Veränderungen bei den Bombyces und Sphinges Europas und Nordwestafrikas (Lepidoptera: Geometroidea, Axiidae). Mitt. ArbGem. öst. Ent. 35(1/2): 17-20.
- Freina J. de. & Witt T. 1983. 12.Vorarbeit. Stoermeriana gen.nov., eine neue Gattung der Familie Lasiocampidae (Lepidoptera: Lasiocampidae IV). Mitt.münch.ent.Ges (31 Dezember 1983). 73: 15-22.
- Witt T. 1983. Ocnogyna parasita (HÜBNER, 1790) neu für die Insel Lesbos, Griechenland (Lepidoptera, Arctiidae). NachrBl. bayer. Ent. 32(4): 126-127.
- Witt T. 1983. Apaidia rufeola (RAMBUR, 1832) (Lepidoptera: Lithosiidae) new for the Balearic Islands. Entomologist's Gazette. 24: 235.
- Witt T. 1983. Stygia mosulensis (Lepidoptera: Lithosiidae) new for Morocco. Entomologist's Gazette. 34: 236.
- Witt T. 1983. Bibliographie der Macrolepidopterenfauna Südbayerns und der angrenzenden nördlichen Kalkalpen.Vorarbeit zur Erstellung der Fauna Lepidopterologica Bavarica. Entomofauna. 3(27): 439-456.
- Witt T. 1983. Die Verbreitung von Peridea korbi (Rebel, 1918) (Lepidoptera, Notodontidae). NachrBl. bayer. Ent. 32(1): 28-30.
- Aussem B. & Freina J.D.E. & Scheuringer E. & Wiegel K.H. & Witt T. 1982. Fauna Bavarica Lepidopterologica, Aufruf zur Mitarbeit an der Erstellung der Macrolepidopterenfauna Südbayerns. NachrBl.bayer.Ent. 31(2): 27-30.
- Freina J. de. & Witt T. 1982. Nachweis von Brahmaea (Brahmophthalma) wallichii (Gray, 1833) im westlichen Himalaya: Brahmaea wallichii saifulica ssp. n. (Brahmaeidae). Nota lepid. 5(2/3): 81-85.
- Freina J. de. & Witt T. 1982. l. Vorarbeit. Taxonomische Veränderungen bei den Bombyces und Sphinges Europas und Nordwestafrikas. (Lepidoptera: Thaumetopoeidae, Ctenuchidae). Atalanta (Dezember 1982). XI: 309-317.
- Witt T. 1982. Die Verbreitung von Lasiocampa grandis (ROGENHOFER, 1891) in Europa (Lepidoptera, Lasiocampidae). NachrBl. bayer. Ent. 31(2): 27-30.
- Witt T. 1982. Neue Funde von Dendrolimus benderi de Lajonquière, 1975 (Lepidoptera, Lasiocampidae). Entomofauna. 3(3): 27-30.
- Witt T. 1982. Eine neue Unterart von Axia theresiae (KORB, 1899) aus der Türkei und Bemerkungen zum Typenverbleib der von Dr.WERNER MÄRTEN aufgestellten Taxa der Gattung Axia HÜBNER, [1821] 1816 (Lepidoptera, Axiidae). Entomofauna. 3(11): 145-158.
- Witt T. 1981. Rhegmatophila Aussemi sp.n.(Lepidoptera, Notodontidae). Entomofauna. 2(7): 81-92.
- Witt T. 1981. Neue Funde von Phragmacossia albida (Erschoff, 1874) und Hepialus adriaticus Osthelder, 1931 (Lepidoptera, Cossidae, Hepialidae). Entomofauna. 2(11): 133-150.
- Witt T. 1981. Trichiura verenae sp.n.(Lepidoptera, Lasiocampidae). Entomofauna. 2(23): 263-284.
- Witt T. 1980. Die Verbreitung und Rassenbildung von Ocnogyna parasita (HÜBNER, 1790) (Lepidoptera, Arctiidae). Mitt.münch.ent.Ges. 69: 133-165.
- Witt T. 1980. Herbert Meier (1919-1977) Nekrolog mit Bibliographie und Typenfestlegung (Lepidoptera: Psychidae und Zygaenidae). Entomofauna. 1(6): 65-72.
- Witt T. 1980. Melanismus und geographische Variabilität bei Notodonta dromedarius (LINNÉ, 1767) (Lepidoptera, Notodontidae). Entomofauna. 1(7): 73-94.
- Witt T. 1980. Bombyces und Sphinges aus Korea I (Lepidoptera: Bombycidae, Sphingidae). Folia Ent.Hung. XLI(1): 167-174.
- Witt T. 1980. Description of a new species and new subspecies of the genus Anaea Hübner, 1819, from the Yucatán peninsula, with notes on other species (Lepidoptera, Nymphalidae, Charaxinae). Entomofauna. 1(18): 366-383.
- Witt T. 1979. Pelosia hispanica sp.n.(Lepidoptera, Lithosiinae). NachrBl. bayer. Ent. 28(4): 70-74.
- Witt T. 1979. Lemonia pia friedeli n.ssp. (Lepidoptera, Lemoniidae). Z. ArbGem. öst. Ent. 31(1/2): 17-20.
- Baumann H. & Witt T. 1977. Zur Tagfalterfauna des Chanchamayogebietes in Peru, Teil II, Charaxinae. Mitt.münch.ent.Ges. 66: 141-177.
- Daniel F. & Witt T. 1975 [1974]. Beiträge zur Lepidopterenfauna Marokkos - Bombyces et Sphinges. Z. ArbGem. öst. Ent. 26(1): 1-15.
- Schulte A. & Witt T. 1975. Eriogaster amygdali reshoefti n.ssp., eine neue Lasiocampide aus Afghanistan (Lep.). Ent. Zeitschrift. 85(12): 129-133.
- Daniel F. & Witt Th. 1974 [1975]. Beiträge zur Lepidopterenfauna Marokkos – Bombyces et Sphinges. Ztschr. ArbGem Österr. Ent. 26(1): 1-15.
- Witt T. 1974 [1972]. Peridea korbi REBEL, bona species, und ihre Rassen (Lep.Notodontidae). Z. ArbGem. öst. Ent. 24(3): 89-102.
- Witt T.J. 1972. Zum Melanismus von Melanargia galathea L. (Lep.Satyridae). NachrBl. bayer. Ent. 21(1): 1-2.
- Witt T. 1972. Beiträge zur Kenntnis der Gattung Anaea Hübner, (1819) (Lep., Nymphalidae). Mitt.münch.ent.Ges. 62: 163-183.
- Witt T. 1970. Beiträge zur Kenntnis der Insektenfauna Boliviens XXII., Lepidoptera V., Gattung Anaea Hübner, 1819 (Nymphalidae). Veröff. Zool. Staatssamml. München. 14: 43-73.
- Witt T. 1969. Eine Sammelreise nach Ungarn. Mitt.Int.ent.Ver.Frankfurt a.M. 1(1): 9-20.
- Witt T. 1968. Das Weibchen von Anaea phoebe (Druce, 1877) (Lepidoptera, Nymphalidae). Mitt. münch. ent.Ges. 59: 32-34.
- Witt T. 1967. Einige bemerkenswerte Mosaikzwitter von Aglia tau (Lep., Saturniidae). Ent. Z. Frankf.a.M. 77(6): 66-69.
- Witt T.J. 1966. Die Weibchen von Anaea hirta Weymer und Anaea pasibula Doubleday (Lepidoptera, Nymphalidae). Mitt. münch. ent. Ges. 56: 186-189.

== See also ==
- List of museums in Germany
- List of natural history museums
