= Claude Herbulot =

French entomologist (1908–2006)

Claude Herbulot (pronounced [klod ɛʁbylo]; 19 February 1908 – 19 January 2006) was a French entomologist. He was born in Charleville-Mézières and died in Paris. He was a lepidopterist and specialised in moths in the family Geometridae. His collection is housed at the Zoologische Staatssammlung München.

== His life ==
He was born in Charleville-Mézières in 1908 in the Ardennes and his earliest works were on the lepidopteran fauna of the district. Later in his life he visited many afrotropical and oriental countries and spent time in Madagascar studying the fauna and describing about one third of the geometrid species of the island. He was portrayed in his obituary as

... a nice, clever, cultured person and an active, highly competent lepidopterist.

A biography has been published by one of his friends, Philippe Darge.

== Works ==
His best known works include Volumes I and II (Moths) of the Lepidoptera of France, Belgium and Switzerland which was published in 1948 and 1949. The list of his 286 works is provided by the Munich Museum

== Honours ==
He was elected president of the Société entomologique de France in 1953. He was awarded the Spix Medal in 1999 and the Jacob Hübner Award in 2002.

== Genera and species he described ==
He described 950 taxa. The complete list should be published soon.

=== Genera ===
30 genera are attributed to Claude Herbulot, of which 28 are valid:

- Anticleora Herbulot, 1966
- Antilurga Herbulot, 1951
- Antozola Herbulot, 1992
- Archirhoe Herbulot, 1951
- Catarhoe Herbulot, 1951
- Dargeia Herbulot, 1977
- Darisodes Herbulot, 1972
- Dorsifulcrum Herbulot, 1979
- Dyschlorodes Herbulot, 1966
- Dysrhoe Herbulot, 1951
- Glaucorhoe Herbulot, 1951
- Grammorhoe Herbulot, 1951
- Hyalinometra Herbulot, 1972
- Hydatopsis Herbulot, 1968
- Klinzigidia Herbulot, 1982
- Malgassapeira Herbulot (cited in the literature but has never been published)
- Malgassorhoe Herbulot, 1955
- Malgassothisa Herbulot 1966
- Microlyces Herbulot 1981
- Mimaplasta Herbulot 1993
- Orbamia Herbulot 1966
- Paramathia Herbulot 1948
- Pareulype Herbulot, 1951
- Parortholitha Herbulot, 1955
- Protorhoe Herbulot, 1951
- Pseudolarentia Herbulot, 1955
- Rougeotiana Herbulot, 1983
- Rougeotiella Herbulot, 1984 (in replacement of Rougeotiana, a name already used by Bernard Laporte to designate a new genus of Noctuidae)
- Steganomima Herbulot, 1972
- Toulgoetia Herbulot, 1946

=== List of taxa ===
A list of about 400 of the taxa he created, fully referenced, is given elsewhere

== Entomological terms named after him ==
The Munich museum lists the 4 genera and 29 species described
