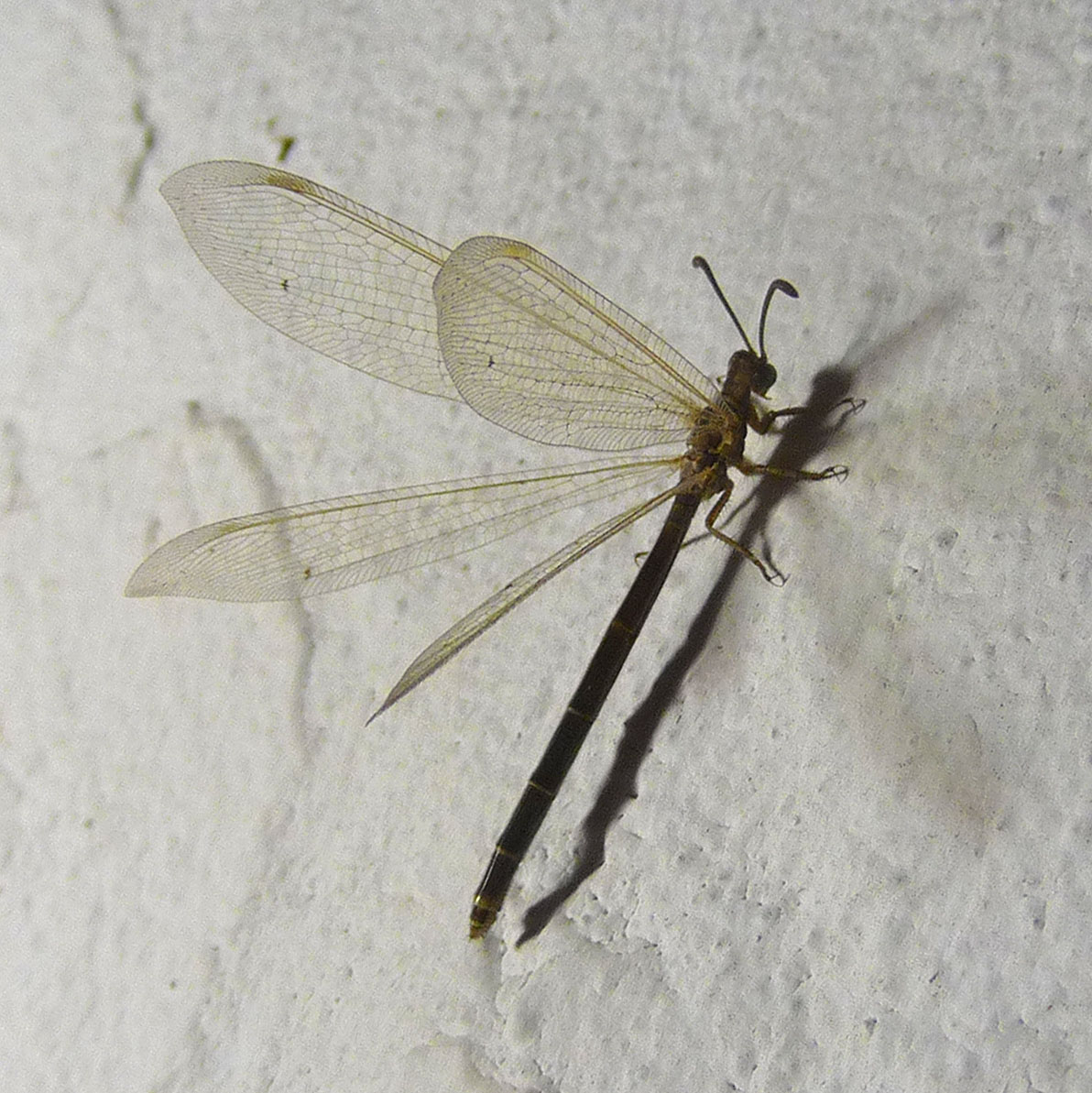
- Creoleon sp., in the UK

Scientific classification
- Kingdom: Animalia
- Phylum: Arthropoda
- Clade: Pancrustacea
- Class: Insecta
- Order: Neuroptera
- Family: Myrmeleontidae
- Subfamily: Nemoleontinae
- Tribe: Nemoleontini
- Genus: Creoleon; Tillyard, 1918

Synonyms
- Creagris Hagen 1860

= Creoleon =

Genus of insects

Creoleon is a genus of antlions (neuropteran insects in the family Myrmeleontidae) in the subfamily Myrmeleontinae. It is an extant genus but there is at least one fossil species.

== Species ==
- Creoleon aegyptiacus (Rambur, 1842)
- Creoleon afer Navás, 1931
- Creoleon africanus (Rambur, 1842)
- Creoleon antennatus (Navás, 1914)
- Creoleon arenosus Navás, 1934
- Creoleon cecconinus Navás, 1932
- Creoleon cervinus Hölzel, 1983
- Creoleon chappuisi Navás, 1936
- Creoleon cinerascens (Navás, 1912)
- Creoleon cinnamomeus (Navás, 1913)
- Creoleon confalonierii Navás, 1932
- Creoleon corsicus (Hagen, 1860)
- Creoleon decussatus (Navás, 1914)
- Creoleon desertus Hölzel, 1982
- Creoleon diana (Kolbe, 1897)
- Creoleon ducalis Navás, 1929
- Creoleon elegans Hölzel, 1968
- Creoleon falcatus Navás, 1922
- Creoleon fulvinervis Navás, 1932
- Creoleon giganteus Navás, 1932
- Creoleon griseus (Klug in Ehrenberg, 1834)
- Creoleon gularis Navás, 1926
- Creoleon hiericontinus Navás, 1932
- Creoleon interruptus (Navás, 1914)
- Creoleon irene (Banks, 1939)
- Creoleon languescens Navás, 1936
- Creoleon limpidus (Kolbe, 1897)
- Creoleon littoreus (Navás, 1914)
- Creoleon loanguanus (Navás, 1913)
- Creoleon lugdunensis (Villers, 1789)
- Creoleon lupinus (Olivier, 1811)
- Creoleon luteipennis (Burmeister, 1839)
- Creoleon mashunus (Péringuey, 1910)
- Creoleon maurus Navás, 1923
- Creoleon mortifer (Walker, 1853)
- Creoleon neftanus Navás, 1930
- Creoleon neurasthenicus (Navás, 1913)
- Creoleon nigritarsis Navás, 1921
- Creoleon nubifer (Kolbe, 1897)
- Creoleon parallelus (Banks, 1911)
- Creoleon parvulus Hölzel, 1983
- Creoleon patrizianus Navás, 1932
- Creoleon pauperatus (Navás, 1914)
- Creoleon persicus Hölzel, 1972
- Creoleon plumbeus (Olivier, 1811)
- Creoleon pretiosus (Banks, 1911)
- Creoleon pullus Hölzel, 1983
- Creoleon pusillus Hölzel and Ohm, 1991
- Creoleon remanei Hölzel, 1972
- Creoleon somalicus Navás, 1932
- Creoleon surcoufi (Navás, 1912)
- Creoleon tarsalis Navás, 1936
- Creoleon tenuatus (Fraser, 1951)
- Creoleon turbidus (Navás, 1920)
- Creoleon ultimus Hölzel, 1983
- Creoleon venosus (Navás, 1914)
