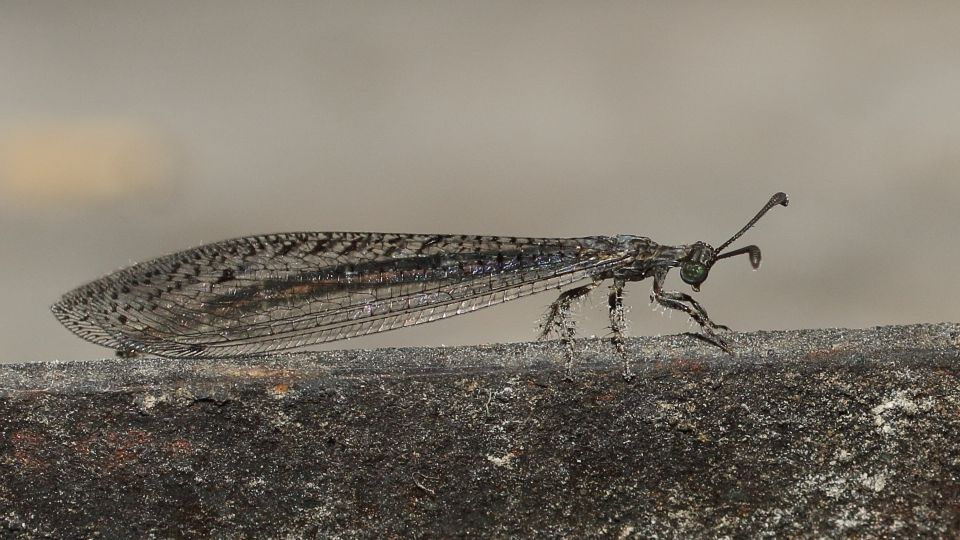
- Neuroleon lepidus

Scientific classification
- Kingdom: Animalia
- Phylum: Arthropoda
- Clade: Pancrustacea
- Class: Insecta
- Order: Neuroptera
- Family: Myrmeleontidae
- Subfamily: Nemoleontinae
- Tribe: Nemoleontini
- Subtribe: Neuroleontina
- Genus: Neuroleon; Navas, 1909

= Neuroleon =

Genus of insects

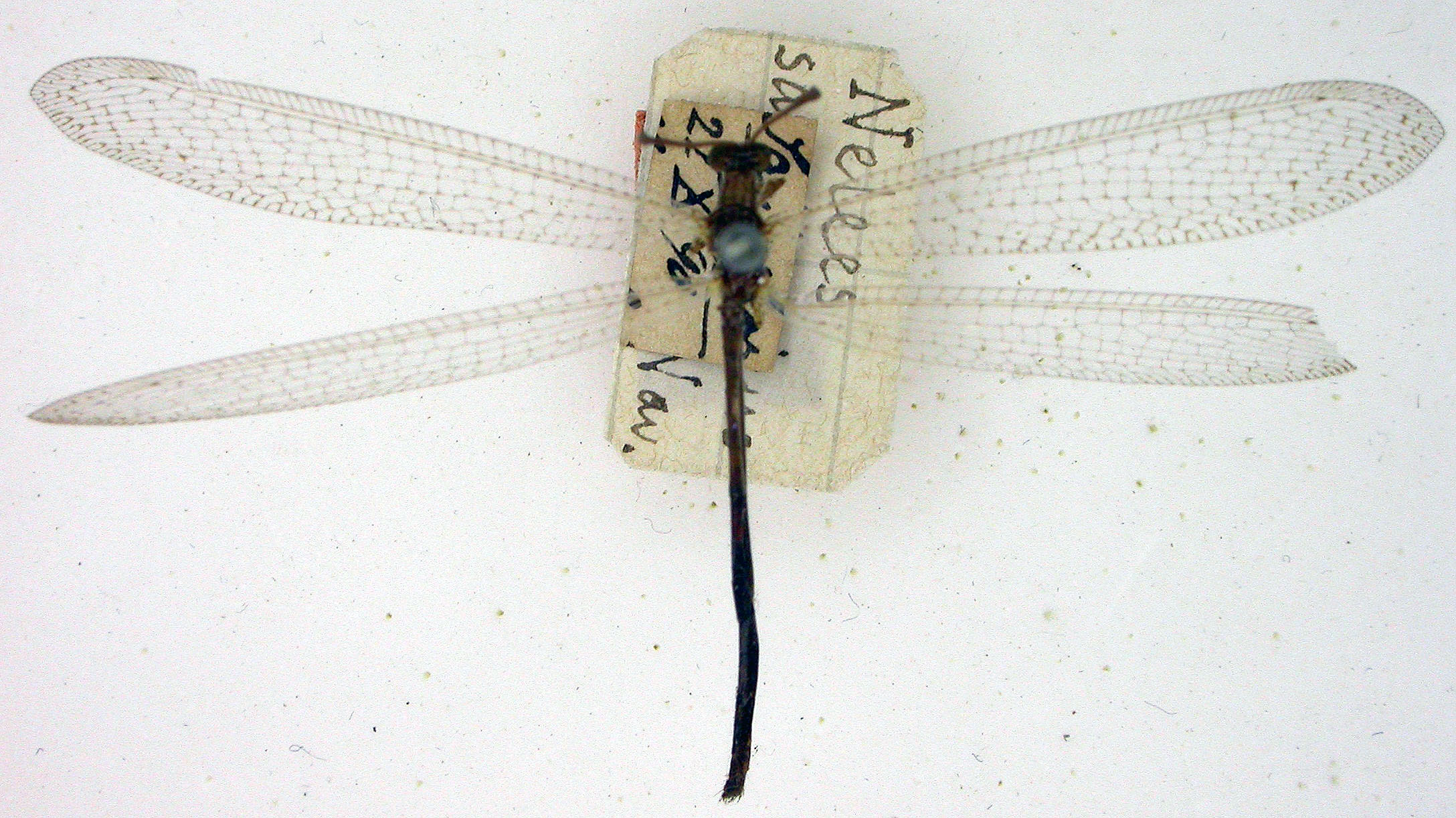
Neuroleon sansibaricus type specimen from the Bavarian State Collection of Zoology

Neuroleon is a large and complex genus of antlions in the subfamily Myrmeleontinae. There are more than 150 described species from Europe, Asia and Africa, and there are many undescribed taxa. Where the biology of the larvae is known, they live freely in sand or in sheltered rock crevices.

== Species ==
Species list from Catalogue of Life:

- Neuroleon adspersus
- Neuroleon aegaeus
- Neuroleon aguilari
- Neuroleon alexandrei
- Neuroleon amseli
- Neuroleon antii
- Neuroleon apicalis
- Neuroleon arenarius
- Neuroleon argutus
- Neuroleon asirensis
- Neuroleon assimilis
- Neuroleon basilineatus
- Neuroleon basutinus
- Neuroleon belohensis
- Neuroleon braunsi
- Neuroleon bronzii
- Neuroleon caligatus
- Neuroleon canariensis
- Neuroleon chloranthe
- Neuroleon clignyi
- Neuroleon confusus
- Neuroleon congolanus
- Neuroleon crosi
- Neuroleon dancalicus
- Neuroleon danieli
- Neuroleon deceptor
- Neuroleon decoratus
- Neuroleon delicatus
- Neuroleon demeter
- Neuroleon dianae
- Neuroleon diffusus
- Neuroleon distichus
- Neuroleon distinctus
- Neuroleon drosimus
- Neuroleon ducorpsi
- Neuroleon egenus
- Neuroleon erato
- Neuroleon fanaticus
- Neuroleon festai
- Neuroleon gracilis
- Neuroleon gratus
- Neuroleon guernei
- Neuroleon guptaii
- Neuroleon guttatus
- Neuroleon hieraticus
- Neuroleon hyalinus
- Neuroleon imperator
- Neuroleon indistinctus
- Neuroleon infidus
- Neuroleon infirmus
- Neuroleon inspersus
- Neuroleon jucundus
- Neuroleon junior
- Neuroleon laglaizinus
- Neuroleon laniger
- Neuroleon laufferi
- Neuroleon lepidus
- Neuroleon leptaleus
- Neuroleon lesnei
- Neuroleon linarixius
- Neuroleon loangeinus
- Neuroleon lodwarinus
- Neuroleon longipennis
- Neuroleon lugubris
- Neuroleon lukhtanovi
- Neuroleon macilentus
- Neuroleon marcopolo
- Neuroleon maroccanus
- Neuroleon mavromustakisi
- Neuroleon microstenus
- Neuroleon modestus
- Neuroleon mozambicus
- Neuroleon muzanus
- Neuroleon nemausiensis
- Neuroleon nigericus
- Neuroleon nigriventris
- Neuroleon nubilatus
- Neuroleon nubilus
- Neuroleon ochreatus
- Neuroleon pallidus
- Neuroleon pardalice
- Neuroleon parvus
- Neuroleon pauliani
- Neuroleon podagricus
- Neuroleon polyzonus
- Neuroleon pulchellus
- Neuroleon punctatus
- Neuroleon punjabensis
- Neuroleon quadripunctatus
- Neuroleon regnieri
- Neuroleon retialis
- Neuroleon reticulatus
- Neuroleon roscidus
- Neuroleon sansibaricus
- Neuroleon serrandi
- Neuroleon seyrigi
- Neuroleon signatus
- Neuroleon sociorus
- Neuroleon socotranus
- Neuroleon stenopterus
- Neuroleon striatellus
- Neuroleon striatus
- Neuroleon striolatus
- Neuroleon striolus
- Neuroleon syrus
- Neuroleon taifensis
- Neuroleon telosensis
- Neuroleon tenellus
- Neuroleon tibestinus
- Neuroleon torridus
- Neuroleon tristichus
- Neuroleon tristictus
- Neuroleon uniformis
- Neuroleon unpunctatus
- Neuroleon waterloti
- Neuroleon villosus
- Neuroleon virgineus
- Neuroleon zakharenkoi
