= Suca =

Suca may refer to:

- Suca (lacewing), a genus of antlions in the family Myrmeleontidae
- Suca, a genus of birds in the family Sulidae, synonym of Sula

== See also ==
- SUCA
- SucA
