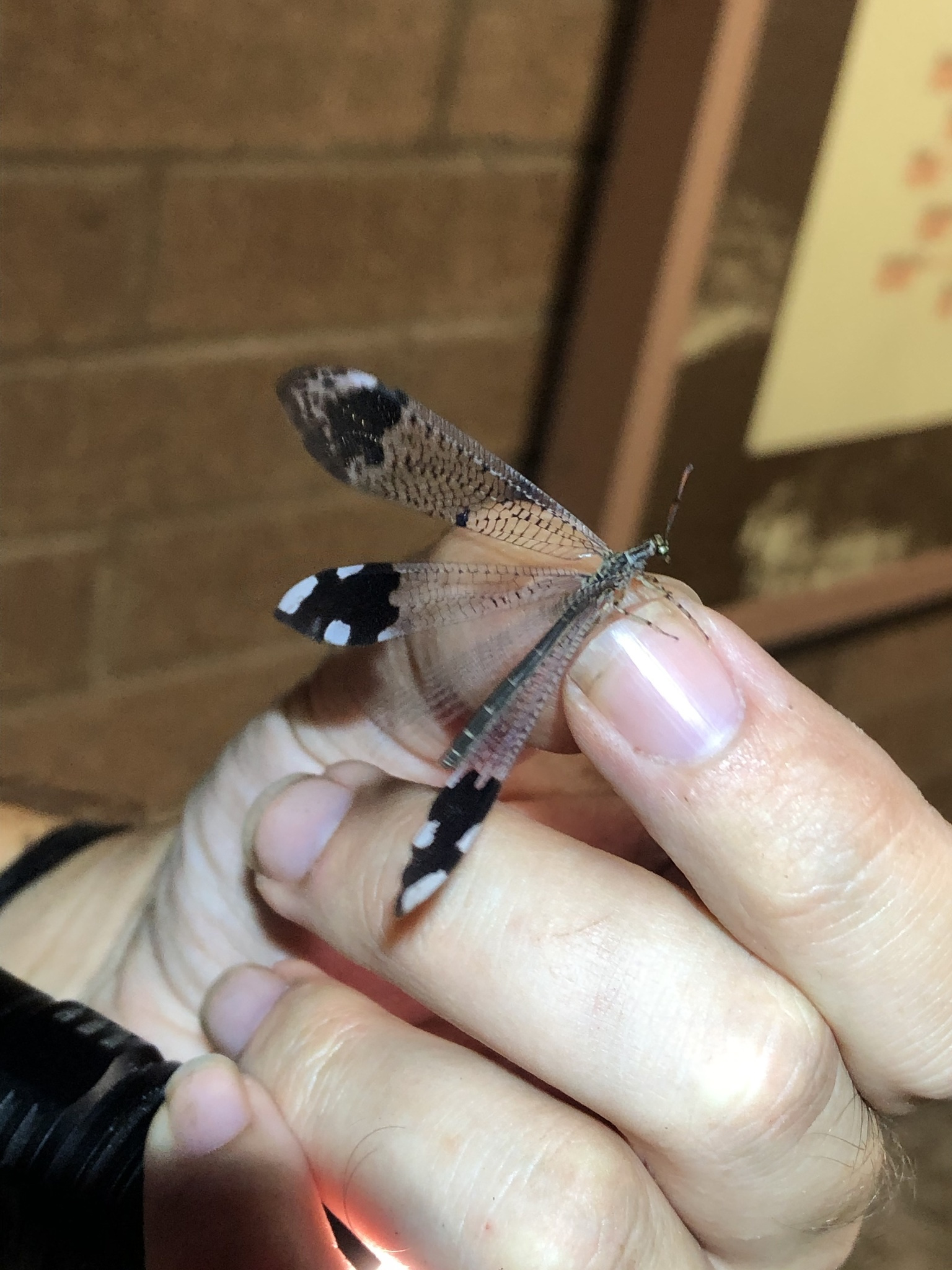

Scientific classification
- Domain: Eukaryota
- Kingdom: Animalia
- Phylum: Arthropoda
- Class: Insecta
- Order: Neuroptera
- Family: Myrmeleontidae
- Genus: Glenurus
- Species: G. luniger

Binomial name
- Glenurus luniger Gerstaecker, 1894

= Glenurus luniger =

Species of insect

Glenurus luniger is a species of antlion in the family Myrmeleontidae. It is found in Central America and North America.
