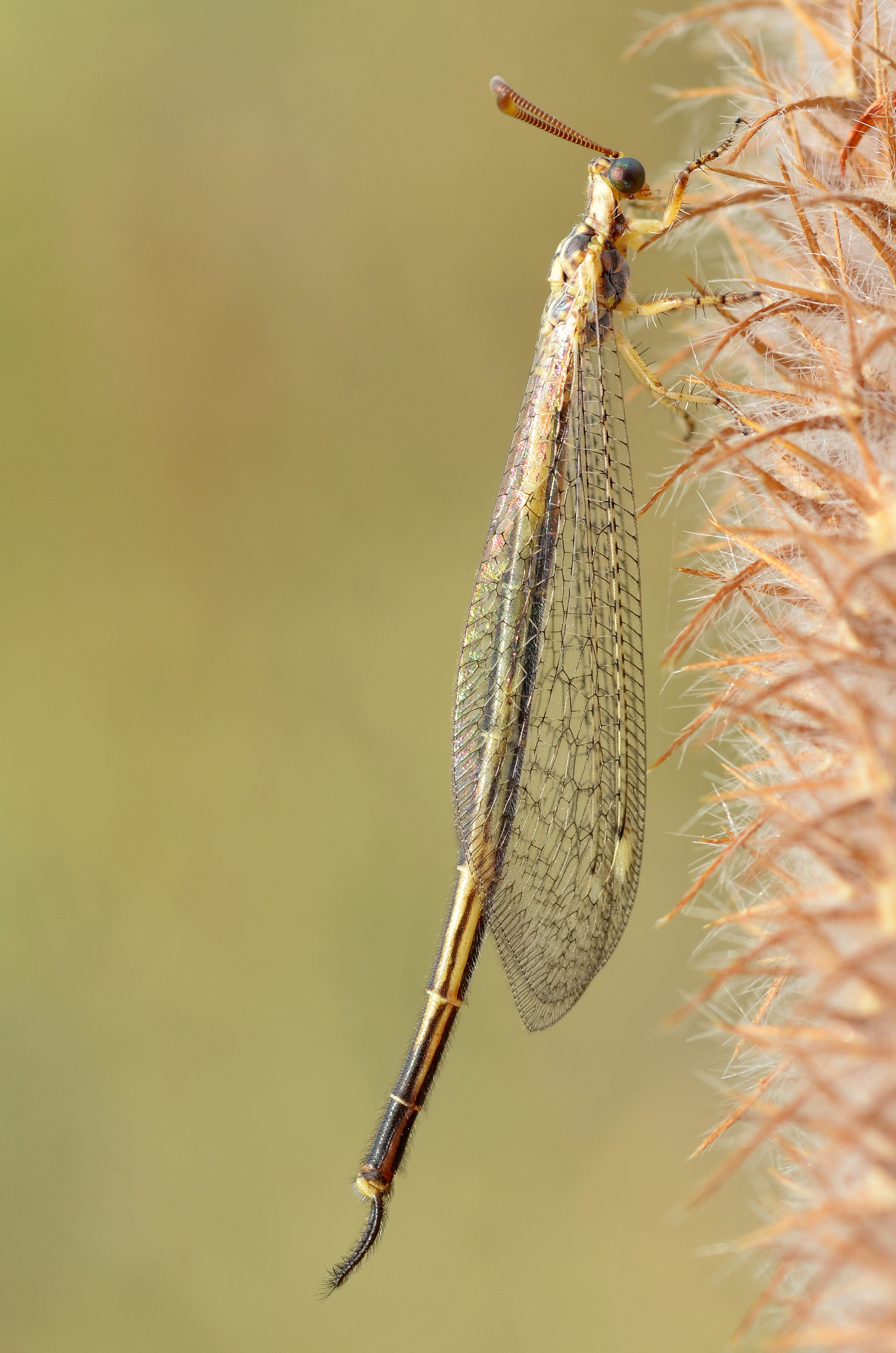
- Macronemurus appendiculatus

Scientific classification
- Kingdom: Animalia
- Phylum: Arthropoda
- Class: Insecta
- Order: Neuroptera
- Family: Myrmeleontidae
- Subfamily: Nemoleontinae
- Tribe: Macronemurini; Esben-Petersen, 1918

= Macronemurini =

Tribe of insects

Macronemurini is a tribe within the family Myrmeleontidae, the ant-lions.

== Genera ==
BioLib includes:

1. Geyria Esben-Petersen, 1920
2. Macronemurus A. Costa, 1855
3. Mesonemurus Navás, 1920
