= Creoleon elegans =

Scientific classification
- Domain: Eukaryota
- Kingdom: Animalia
- Phylum: Arthropoda
- Class: Insecta
- Order: Neuroptera
- Family: Myrmeleontidae
- Genus: Creoleon
- Species: C. elegans

Binomial name
- Creoleon elegans Hölzel, 1968

Species of insect

Creoleon elegans is a species of antlions (neuropteran insects in the family Myrmeleontidae) in the subfamily Myrmeleontinae. It is found in Iran.
