= Suca (lacewing) =

Scientific classification
- Domain: Eukaryota
- Kingdom: Animalia
- Phylum: Arthropoda
- Class: Insecta
- Order: Neuroptera
- Family: Myrmeleontidae
- Subfamily: Nemoleontinae
- Tribe: Nemoleontini
- Subtribe: Neuroleontina
- Genus: Suca; Navás, 1921

Species
- Suca delicata Navás, 1921; Suca satura Navás, 1921

Genus of insects

Suca is a genus of antlions belonging to the family Myrmeleontidae. The species of this genus are found in Southern Africa.
