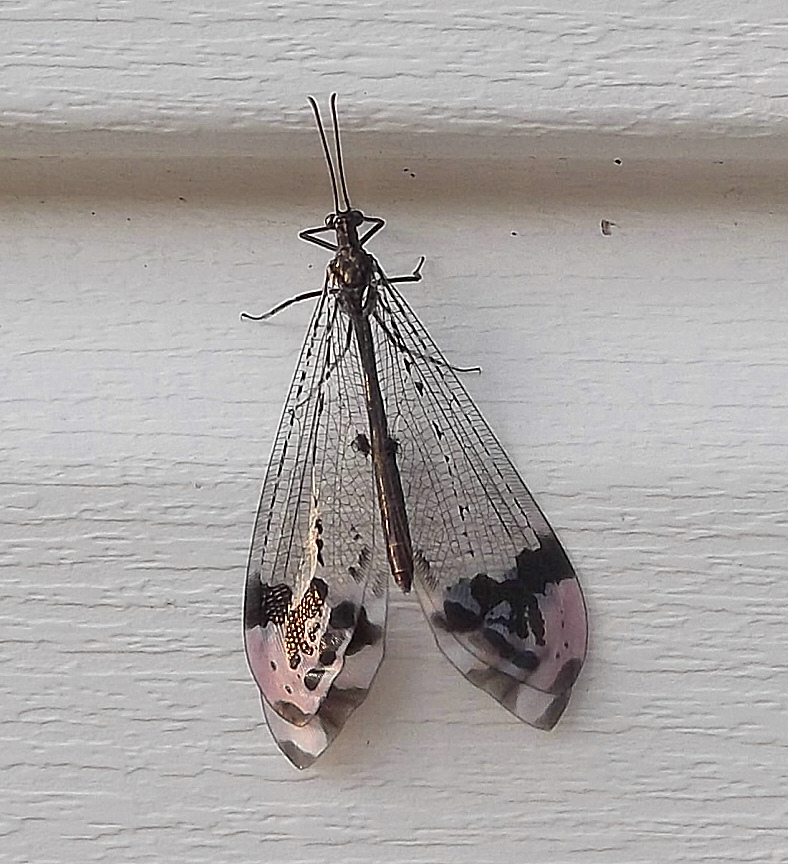

Scientific classification
- Domain: Eukaryota
- Kingdom: Animalia
- Phylum: Arthropoda
- Class: Insecta
- Order: Neuroptera
- Family: Myrmeleontidae
- Genus: Glenurus
- Species: G. gratus

Binomial name
- Glenurus gratus (Say, 1839)

= Glenurus gratus =

Species of insect

Glenurus gratus, also known as the pleasing picture-winged antlion, is a species of antlion in the family Myrmeleontidae. It is found in North America.
