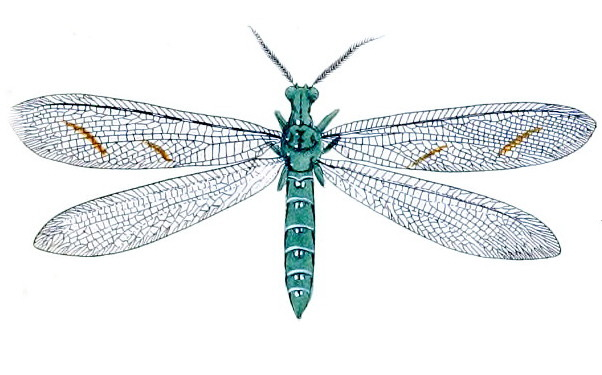
- Euptilon ornatum

Scientific classification
- Kingdom: Animalia
- Phylum: Arthropoda
- Clade: Pancrustacea
- Class: Insecta
- Order: Neuroptera
- Family: Myrmeleontidae
- Tribe: Glenurini
- Genus: Euptilon; Westwood, 1837

Synonyms
- Psammoleon Banks, 1899

= Euptilon =

Genus of insects

Euptilon is a genus of antlions in the family Myrmeleontidae. There are about five described species in Euptilon.

== Species ==
These five species belong to the genus Euptilon:

- Euptilon arizonense (Banks, 1935)
- Euptilon decipiens (Banks, 1935)
- Euptilon normale (Banks, 1942)
- Euptilon ornatum (Drury, 1773)
- Euptilon sinuatum (Currie, 1903)
