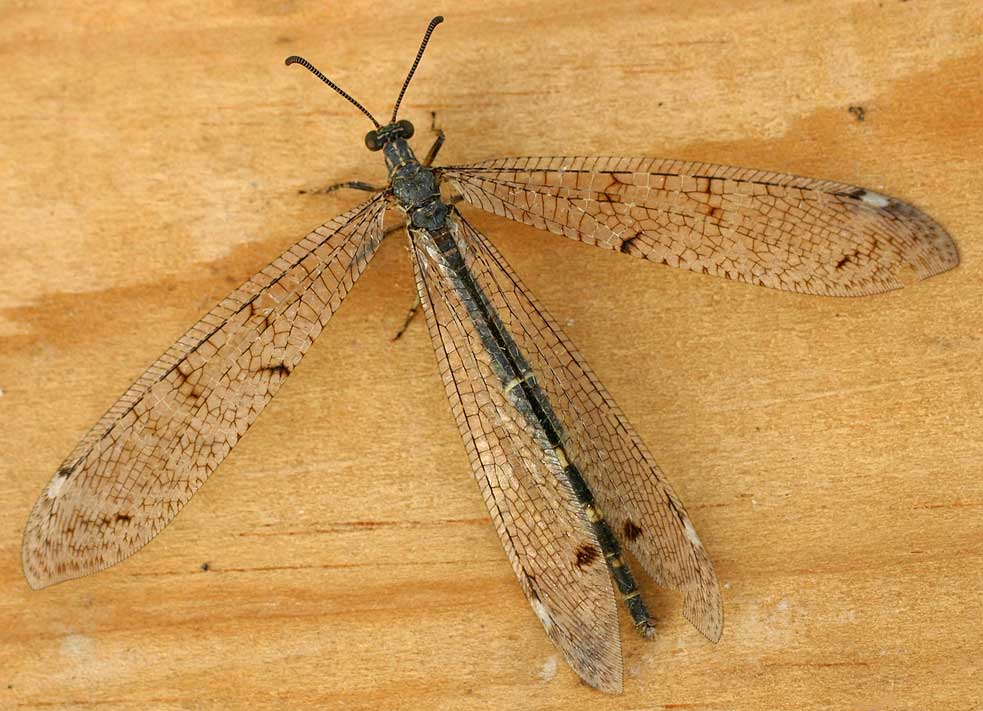
- Adult of Distoleon tetragrammicus

Scientific classification
- Kingdom: Animalia
- Phylum: Arthropoda
- Clade: Pancrustacea
- Class: Insecta
- Order: Neuroptera
- Family: Myrmeleontidae
- Genus: Distoleon
- Species: D. tetragrammicus

Binomial name
- Distoleon tetragrammicus (Fabricius, 1798)

Synonyms
- Formicaleon tetragrammicus (Fabricius, 1798); Myrmeleon tetragrammicum Fabricius, 1798

= Distoleon tetragrammicus =

Species of insect

Distoleon tetragrammicus is a species of antlion in the subfamily Myrmeleontinae.

== Distribution ==
Distoleon tetragrammicus is widespread in the western Palearctic realm and it is present in most of Southern Europe and in North Africa.

== Habitat ==
This species can be found in a wide range of habitats, from coastal dunes to mountain forests, mainly in arid and sandy areas, in oak and pine forests and in various calcareous wasteland with minimum moisture. The larvae avoid exposed sites as coastal dunes.

== Description ==
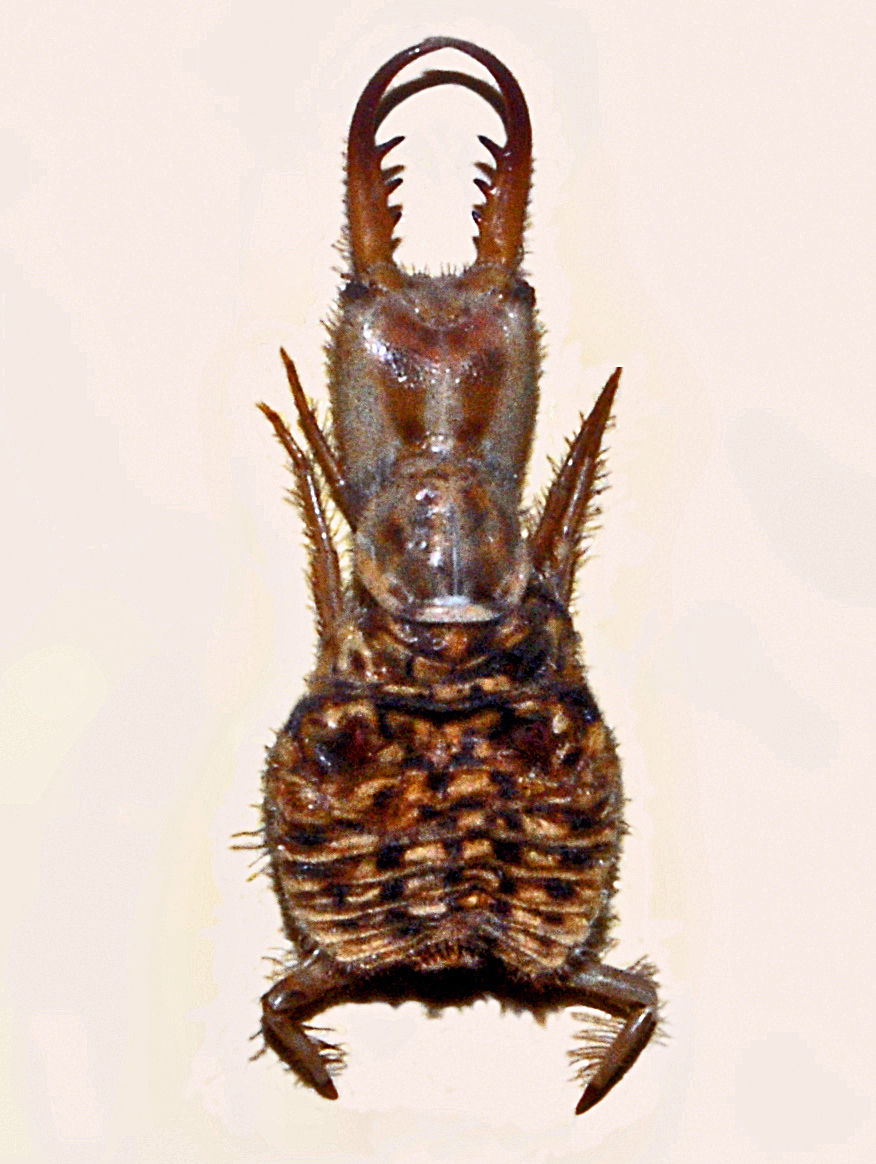
Larva of Distoleon tetragrammicus

The adults of Distoleon tetragrammicus greatly resemble dragonflies or damselflies. They have a wingspan of about 75 millimetres (3.0 in). The front wing can reach a width of 26–40 millimetres (1.0–1.6 in). They have thick, prominent, apically clubbed antennae, a long, narrow abdomen and two pairs of long, transparent, multiveined wings, with some brown and opaque spots. This species is sometimes confused with Myrmeleon formicarius.

The larvae do not look anything like adults. The length of a fully grown larva is typically 12–22 millimetres (0.47–0.87 in). The basic body color is dark brown with darker markings. The head is dark brown. The strong dark brown mandibles do not show long bristles outside the margins. Pronotum is covered by large black setae and short bristles. The dorsal side of abdomen has a series of circular markings and a characteristic dorsal median stripe. Mesothoracic and abdominal spiracles are brown. Legs may be yellowish or whitish.

== Biology ==
The lifecycle of Distoleon tetragrammicus

The adults of Distoleon tetragrammicus appear in the middle of the summer and fly from June to August. They are attracted to light. The life cycle begins with oviposition by the female into sand. Larvae of this species don't build craters or pit traps. They live buried in dry ground and may be errant. They are voracious predators, feeding on small insects and other small arthropods that they catch with their powerful jaws. After one year the larva retreats into a cocoon and metamorphoses into an adult.

== Bibliography ==
- Michael Chinery, Insectes de France et d'Europe occidentale, Paris, Flammarion, août 2012, 320 p. (ISBN 978-2-0812-8823-2), p. 104-105
- Bollettino dell'Istituto di entomologia "Guido Grandi" della Università degli studi di Bologna, Vol. 48-49, Tip. Compositori, 1994.
- Oswald, J. D. (2007). Neuropterida Species of the World.
- Navás, L. (1921) Sur des Névroptères nouveaux ou critiques. Troisème [III] série., Annales de la Société Scientifique de Bruxelles 40(pt. 2):225-232.
- Navás, L. (1914) Neurópteros nuevos o poco conocidos (Tercera [III] serie)., Memorias de la Real Academia de Ciencias y Artes de Barcelona (3)11:193-215.
- Eversmann, E. (1841) Quaedam insectorum species novae, in Rossia orientali observatae, nunc descriptae et depictae., Bulletin de la Société Impériale des Naturalistes de Moscou 14:351-360.
- Olivier, G. A. (1811) Encyclopedie méthodique. Histoire naturelle. Vol. 8 (Insectes). Paris.,
- Fabricius, J. C. (1798) Supplementum entomologiae systematicae. Hafniae.,
