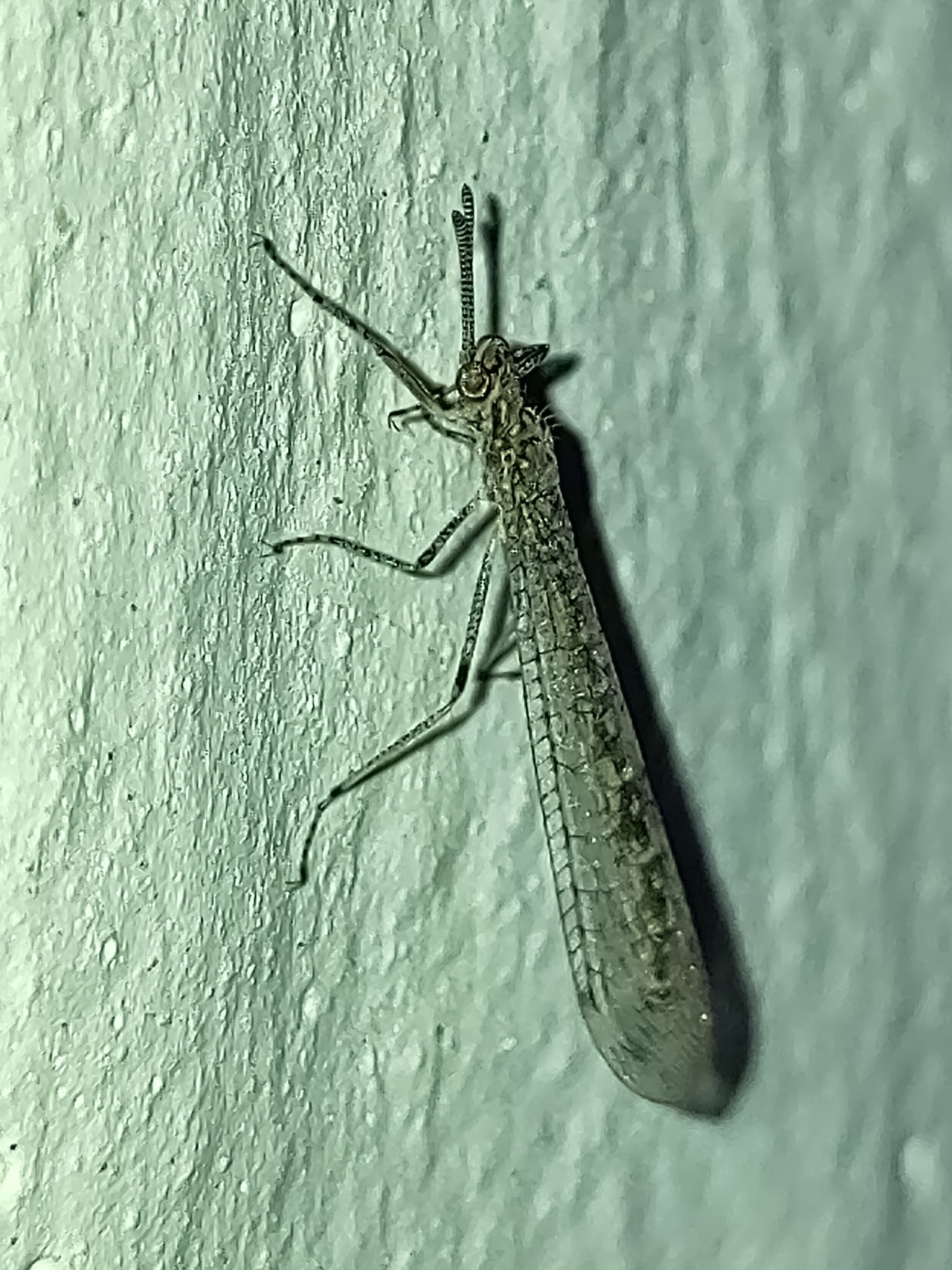

Scientific classification
- Domain: Eukaryota
- Kingdom: Animalia
- Phylum: Arthropoda
- Class: Insecta
- Order: Neuroptera
- Family: Myrmeleontidae
- Genus: Dimarella
- Species: D. angusta

Binomial name
- Dimarella angusta (Banks, 1908)

= Dimarella angusta =

Species of antlion

Dimarella angusta is a species in the antlion family.
