= Nemoleontini =

Scientific classification
- Domain: Eukaryota
- Kingdom: Animalia
- Phylum: Arthropoda
- Class: Insecta
- Order: Neuroptera
- Family: Myrmeleontidae
- Subfamily: Nemoleontinae
- Tribe: Nemoleontini; Banks, 1911

Tribe of insects

Nemoleontini is an antlion tribe in the subfamily Myrmeleontinae.

== Subtribes and genera ==
BioLib includes:

=== Subtribe Dimarellina ===
- Brasileon
- Dimarella

=== Subtribe Nemoleontina ===
1. Antennoleon New, 1985
2. Distoplectron Banks, 1943
3. Fenestroleon New, 1985
4. Mjobergia Esben-Petersen, 1918
5. Nemoleon Navás, 1909
6. Protoplectron Gerstaecker, 1885

=== Subtribe Neuroleontina ===
1. Acratoleon Banks, 1915
2. Brisus Navás, 1931
3. Capicua (insect) Navás, 1921
4. Cymatala Yang C., 1986
5. Delgadus Navás, 1914
6. Graonus Navás, 1922
7. Gymnoleon Banks, 1911
8. Indoleon Fraser, 1952
9. Negrokus Navás, 1930
10. Neguitus Navás, 1912
11. Nelebrachys Navás, 1915
12. Neteja Navás, 1914
13. Neuroleon Navás, 1909
14. Noaleon Holzel, 1972
15. Purenleon Stange in Hoffman, Meinander, Monserrat, Penny & Stange, 2002
16. Quinemurus Kimmins, 1943
17. Ripalda Navás, 1915
18. Rovira (insect) Navás, 1914
19. Sericoleon Esben-Petersen, 1933
20. Suca Navás, 1921
21. Thaumatoleon Esben-Petersen, 1921
22. Visca Navás, 1927

=== Subtribe Obina ===
Authority: Markl, 1954

1. Brachyplectron Esben-Petersen, 1925
2. Capophanes Banks, 1938
3. Exaetoleon Kimmins, 1948
4. Obus (insect) Navás, 1912
