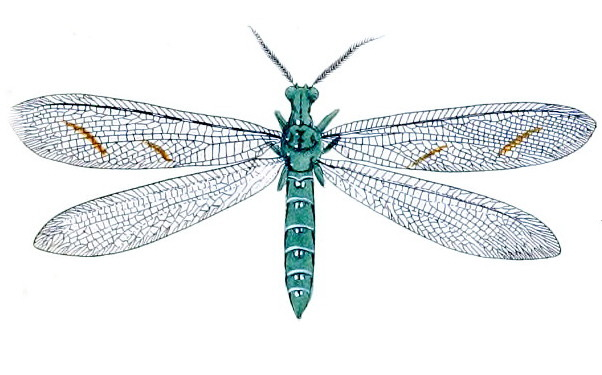

Scientific classification
- Domain: Eukaryota
- Kingdom: Animalia
- Phylum: Arthropoda
- Class: Insecta
- Order: Neuroptera
- Family: Myrmeleontidae
- Genus: Euptilon
- Species: E. ornatum

Binomial name
- Euptilon ornatum (Drury, 1773)

Synonyms
- Psammoleon guttipes Banks, 1906; Psammoleon ingeniosus (Walker, 1853)

= Euptilon ornatum =

Species of insect

Euptilon ornatum is a species of antlion in the family Myrmeleontidae. It is found in Central America and North America.
