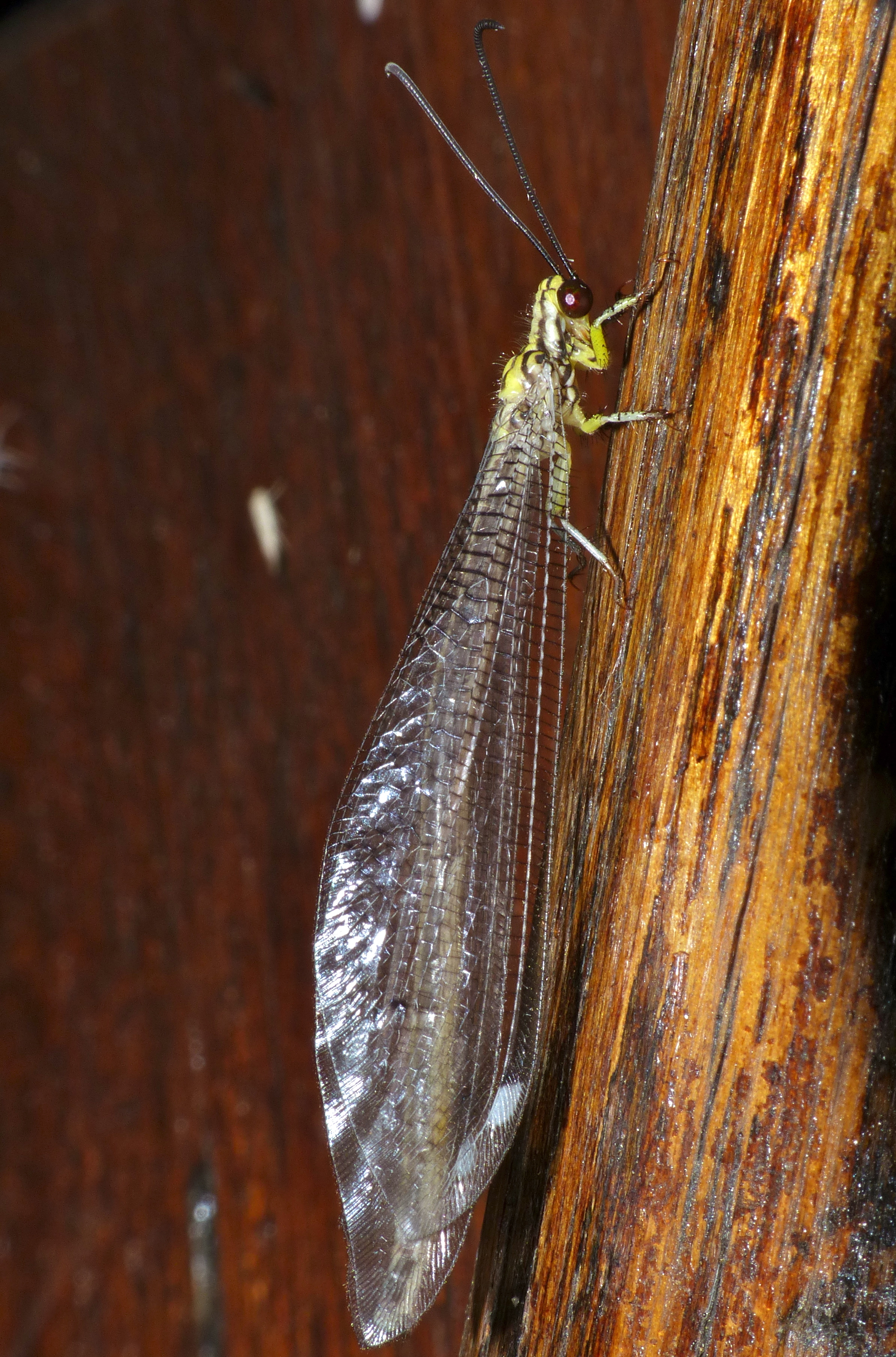

Scientific classification
- Kingdom: Animalia
- Phylum: Arthropoda
- Class: Insecta
- Order: Neuroptera
- Family: Myrmeleontidae
- Genus: Hagenomyia
- Species: H. tristis

Binomial name
- Hagenomyia tristis (Walker, 1853)

= Hagenomyia tristis =

Species of insect

Hagenomyia tristis is an African antlion species. It is known as the gregarious antlion as it is often found in swarms in long grass in the shade of trees. The range of this species extends from eastern South Africa to Cameroon and Ethiopia; it is also found in Madagascar. The larvae build sand pit traps to capture prey. This species is believed to be the mimic of Banyutus lethalis, with both species commonly swarming together.

== Gallery ==
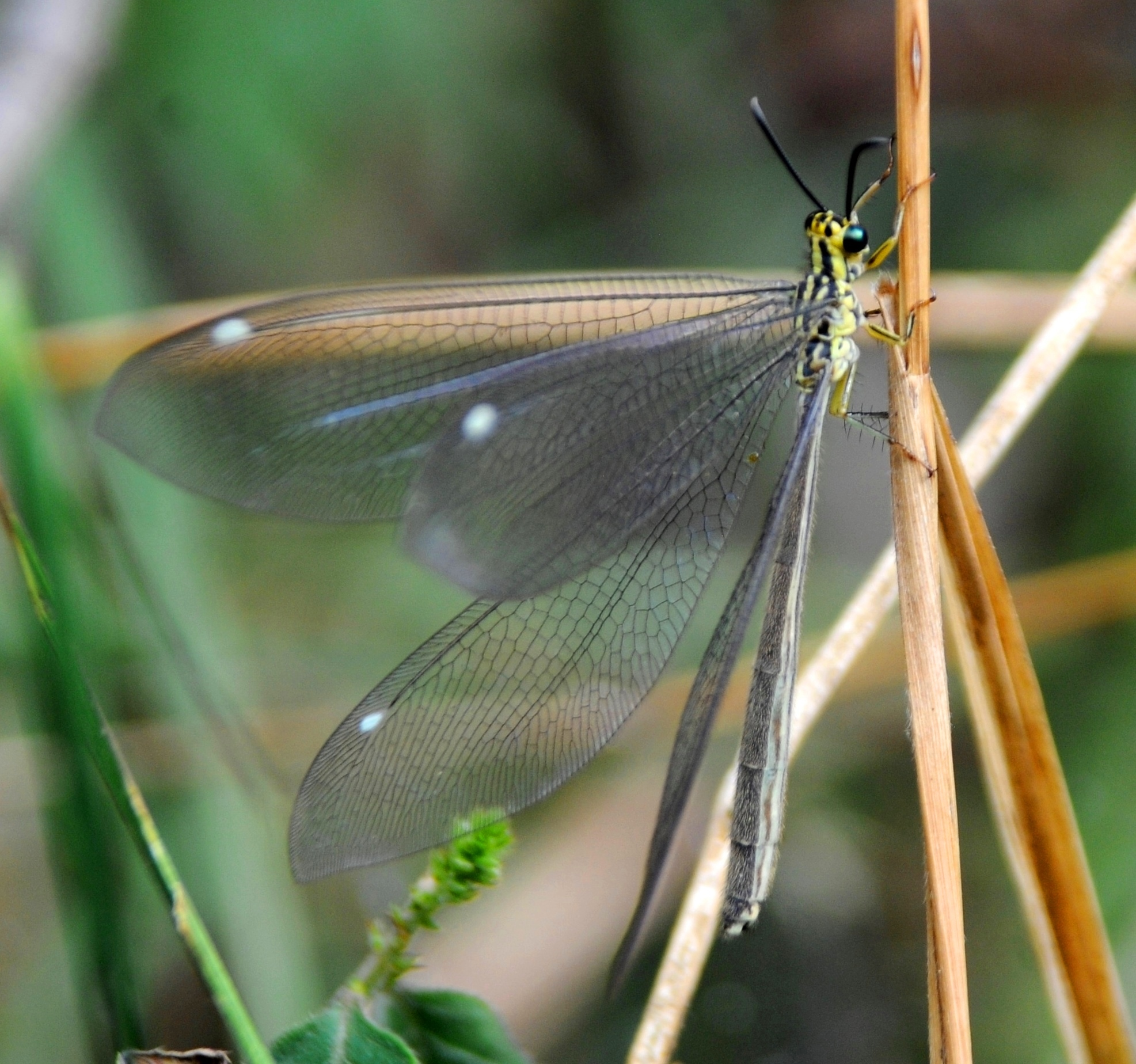
perched on a grass stalk

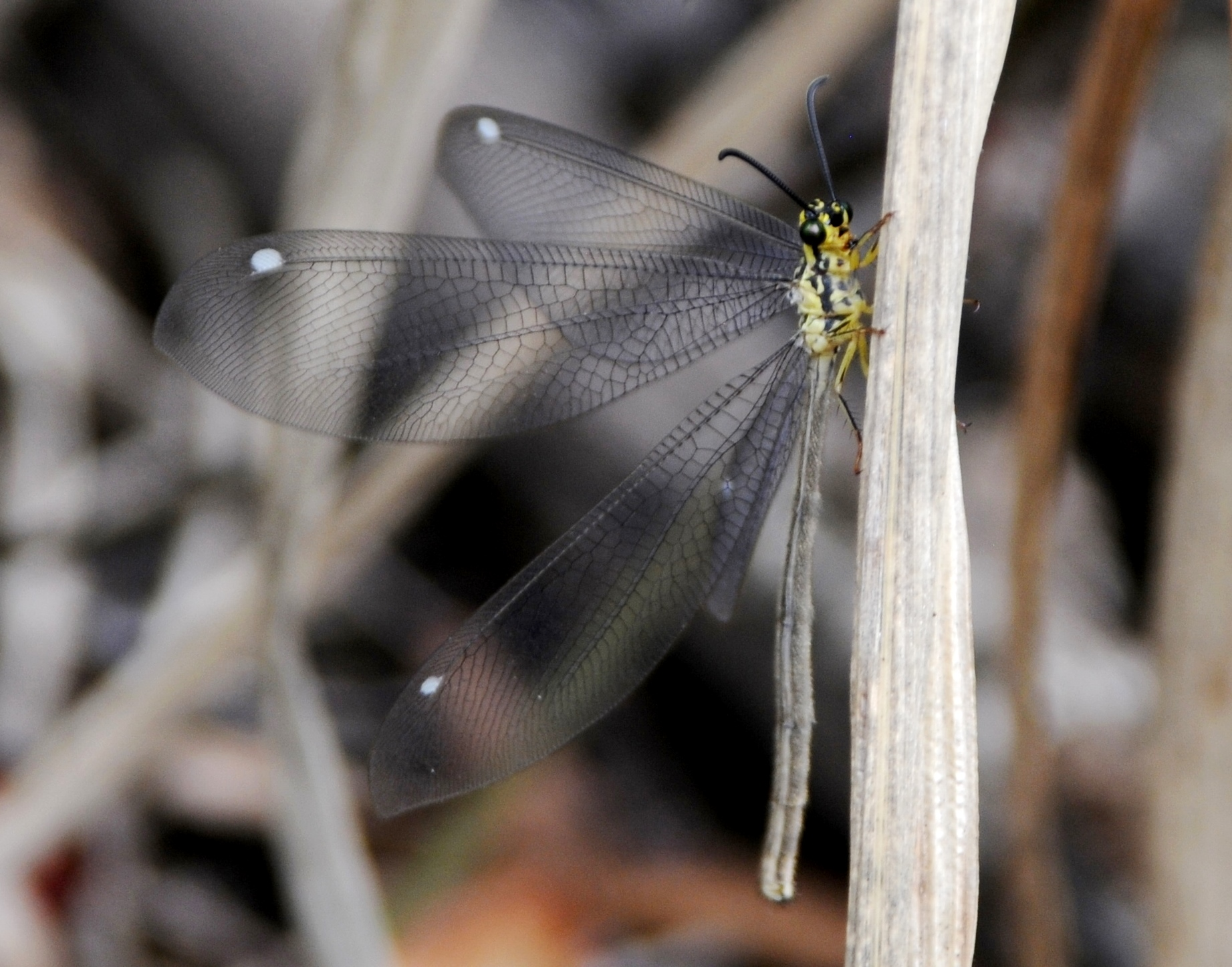
ditto, ventral aspect

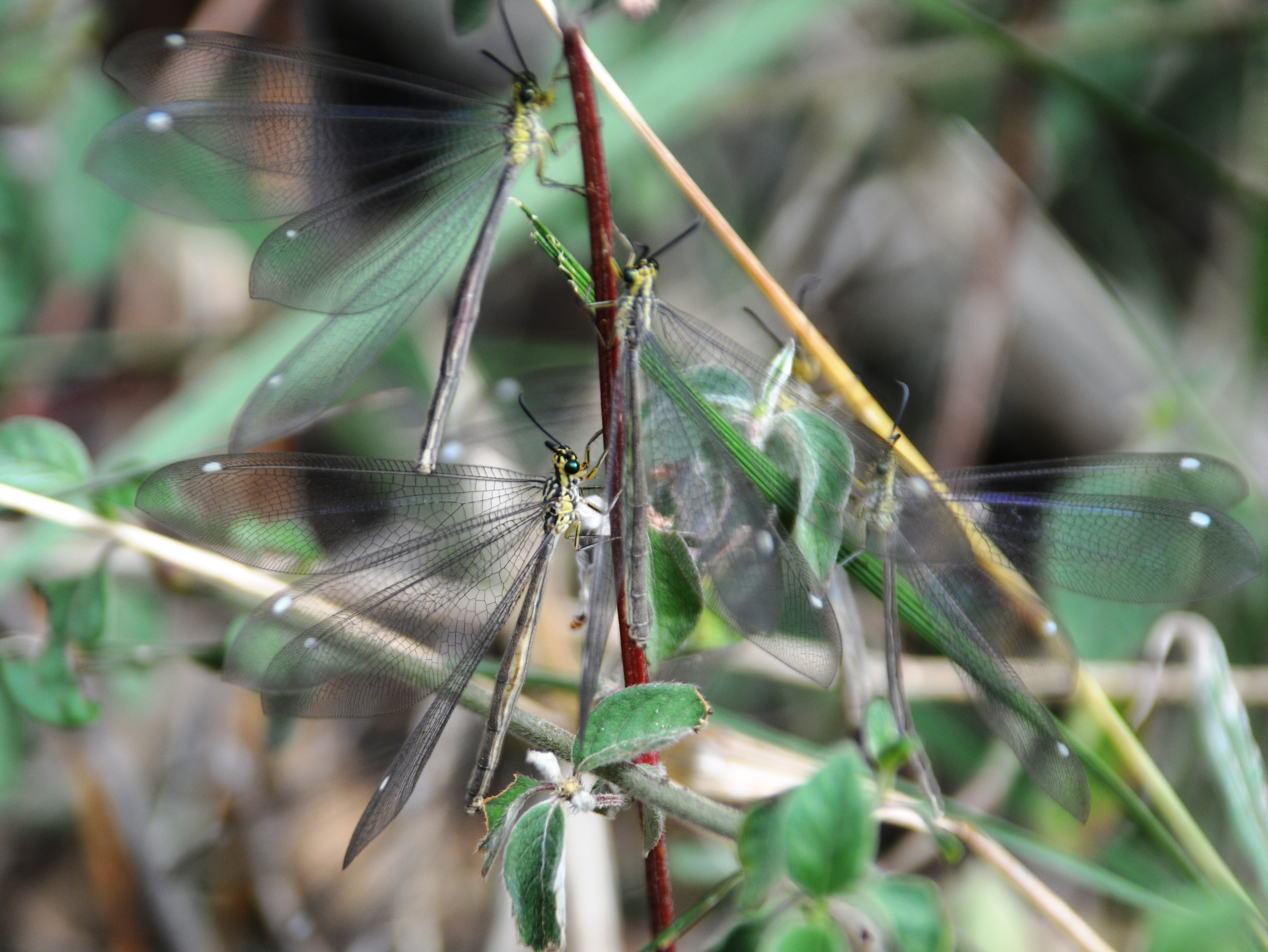
gregarious roosting on shaded shrubs
