= Indoleon =

Scientific classification
- Domain: Eukaryota
- Kingdom: Animalia
- Phylum: Arthropoda
- Class: Insecta
- Order: Neuroptera
- Family: Myrmeleontidae
- Subtribe: Neuroleontina
- Genus: Indoleon; Banks, 1913

Genus of insects

Indoleon is a genus of antlions belonging to the family Myrmeleontidae.

The species of this genus are found in Central Asia.

Species:

- Indoleon audax (Walker, 1853)
- Indoleon barbarus (Walker, 1853)
- Indoleon fluctosus Yang et al., 1988
- Indoleon infestus (Walker, 1853)
- Indoleon longicorpus Yang, 1986
- Indoleon sinensis (Banks, 1940)
- Indoleon tacitus (Walker, 1853)
- Indoleon vartianorum (Hölzel, 1972)
