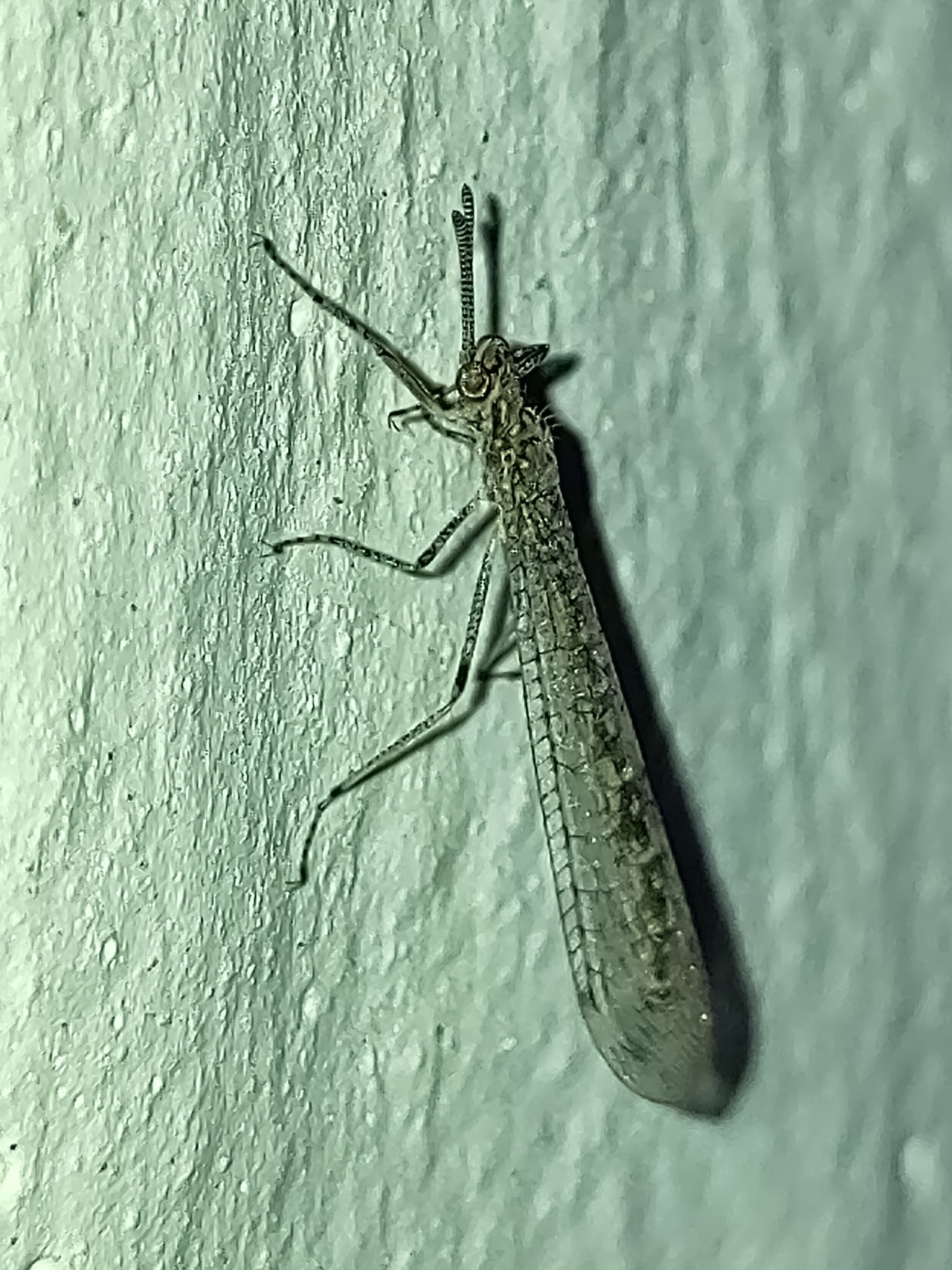
- Dimarella angusta

Scientific classification
- Domain: Eukaryota
- Kingdom: Animalia
- Phylum: Arthropoda
- Class: Insecta
- Order: Neuroptera
- Family: Myrmeleontidae
- Subfamily: Nemoleontinae
- Tribe: Glenurini
- Genus: Dimarella; Banks, 1913

= Dimarella =

Genus of antlion

Dimarella is a genus in the antlion family. It contains sixteen species:

- Dimarella angusta (Banks, 1908)
- Dimarella bipunctata (Navás, 1915)
- Dimarella bolivarensis Stange in Miller & Stange, 1989
- Dimarella cauta (Walker, 1853)
- Dimarella effera (Walker, 1853)
- Dimarella garciai (Navás, 1932)
- Dimarella guarica Stange in Miller & Stange, 1989
- Dimarella menkei Stange, 1963
- Dimarella mixteca Miller in Miller & Stange, 1989
- Dimarella nayarita Stange in Miller & Stange, 1989
- Dimarella praedator (Walker, 1853)
- Dimarella psammophila Stange, 1963
- Dimarella riparia (Navás, 1918)
- Dimarella tarsalis (Guilding, 1829)
- Dimarella totoneca Miller in Miller & Stange, 1989
- Dimarella zulia Miller in Miller & Stange, 1989
