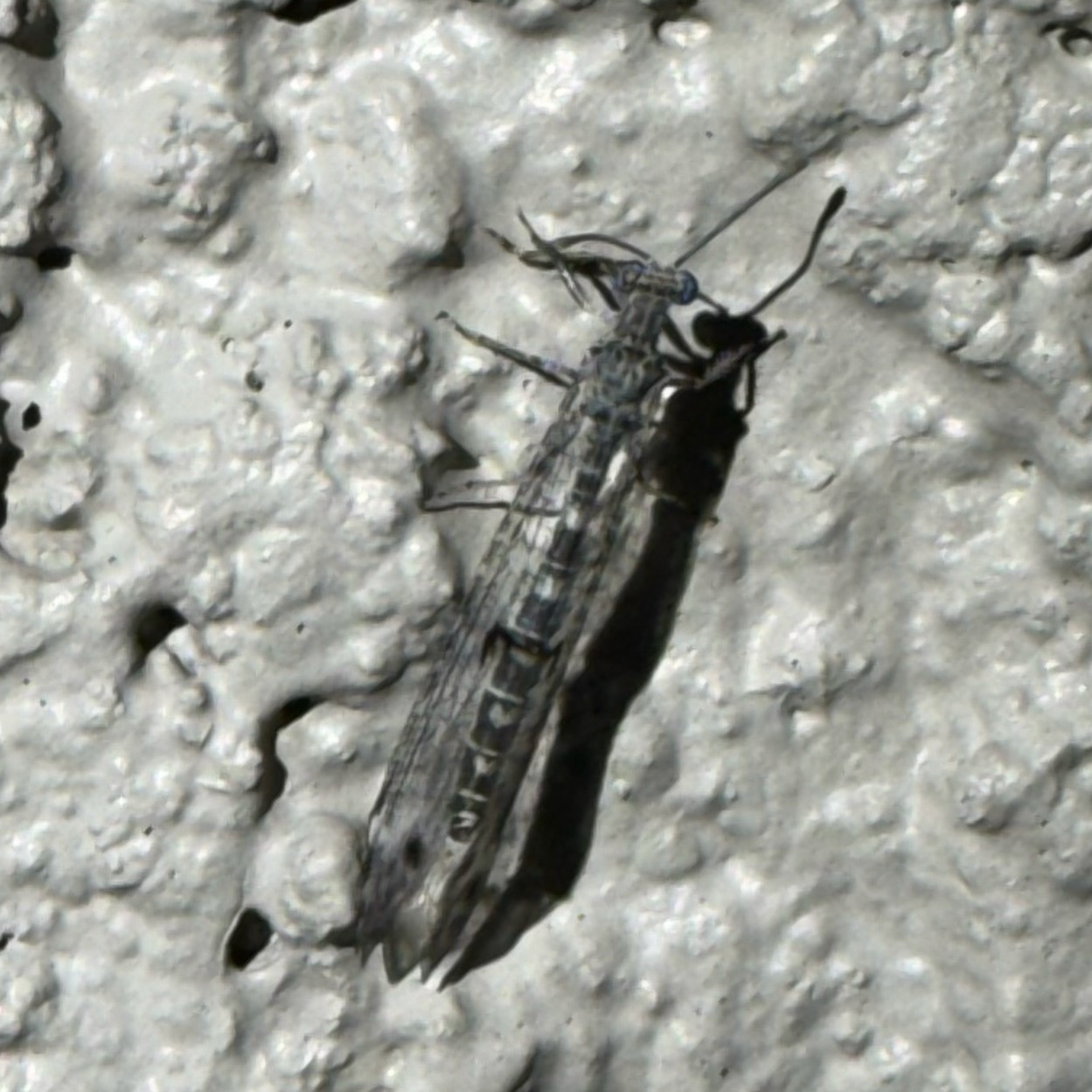
- Eremoleon femoralis

Scientific classification
- Kingdom: Animalia
- Phylum: Arthropoda
- Class: Insecta
- Order: Neuroptera
- Family: Myrmeleontidae
- Subfamily: Nemoleontinae
- Tribe: Glenurini
- Genus: Eremoleon; Banks, 1901

= Eremoleon =

Genus of insects

Eremoleon is a genus of antlions belonging to the family Myrmeleontidae. The species of this genus are found from the southern United States to Central America.

== Species ==
This genus includes the following 36 species:

- Eremoleon adonis Miller & Stange, 2016
- Eremoleon anomalus (Rambur, 1842)
- Eremoleon attenuatus Miller & Stange, 2016
- Eremoleon capitatus (Navás, 1913)
- Eremoleon cerverai (Navás, 1921)
- Eremoleon cerverinus (Navás, 1921)
- Eremoleon dodsoni Miller & Stange, 2016
- Eremoleon dunklei Stange, 1999
- Eremoleon durangoensis Miller & Stange, 2016
- Eremoleon femoralis (Banks, 1942)
- Eremoleon genini (Navás, 1924)
- Eremoleon gracilis Adams, 1957
- Eremoleon impluviatus (Gerstaecker, 1894)
- Eremoleon inca Miller & Stange, 2016
- Eremoleon insipidus Adams, 1957
- Eremoleon jacumba Miller & Stange, 2016
- Eremoleon jamaica Miller & Stange, 2016
- Eremoleon longior Banks, 1938
- Eremoleon macer (Hagen, 1861)
- Eremoleon monagas Miller & Stange, 2016
- Eremoleon morazani Miller & Stange, 2016
- Eremoleon nigribasis Banks, 1920
- Eremoleon ornatipennis (Alayo, 1968)
- Eremoleon pallens Banks, 1941
- Eremoleon petersensi (Banks, 1922)
- Eremoleon petrophila Miller & Stange, 2011
- Eremoleon phasma Miller & Stange, 2011
- Eremoleon pulcher (Esben-Petersen, 1933)
- Eremoleon punctipennis (Banks, 1910)
- Eremoleon pygmaeus Miller & Stange, 2016
- Eremoleon samne Miller & Stange, 2016
- Eremoleon tanya Miller & Stange, 2016
- Eremoleon tepuyiensis Miller & Stange, 2016
- Eremoleon triguttatus (Navás, 1914)
- Eremoleon venezolanus Miller & Stange, 2016
- Eremoleon vitreus (Navás, 1914)
