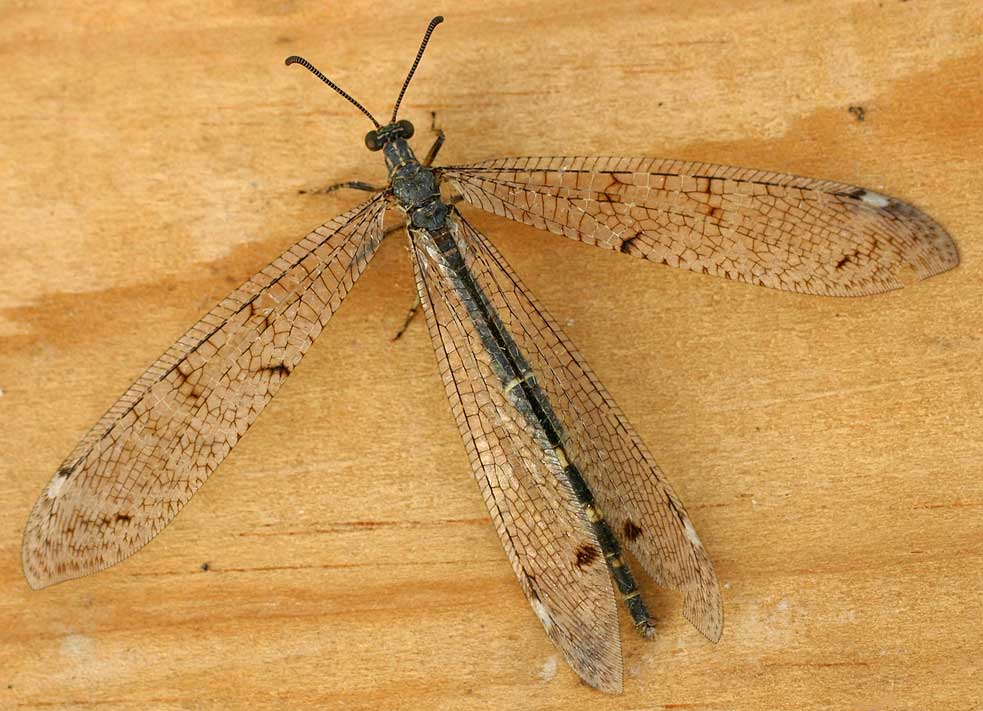
- Distoleon tetragrammicus

Scientific classification
- Kingdom: Animalia
- Phylum: Arthropoda
- Clade: Pancrustacea
- Class: Insecta
- Order: Neuroptera
- Family: Myrmeleontidae
- Subfamily: Nemoleontinae
- Tribe: Distoleontini
- Genus: Distoleon; Banks, 1910

= Distoleon =

Genus of insects

Distoleon is a genus of antlions in the subfamily Myrmeleontinae.

== Species ==
- Distoleon annulatus (Klug, 1834)
- Distoleon bistrigatus (Rambur, 1842)
- Distoleon canariensis (Tjeder, 1939)
- Distoleon catta (Fabricius, 1775)
- Distoleon nefarius Navás, 1910
- Distoleon pulverulentus (Rambur, 1842)
- Distoleon somnolentus (Gerstaecker, 1885)
- Distoleon tetragrammicus (Fabricius, 1798)
