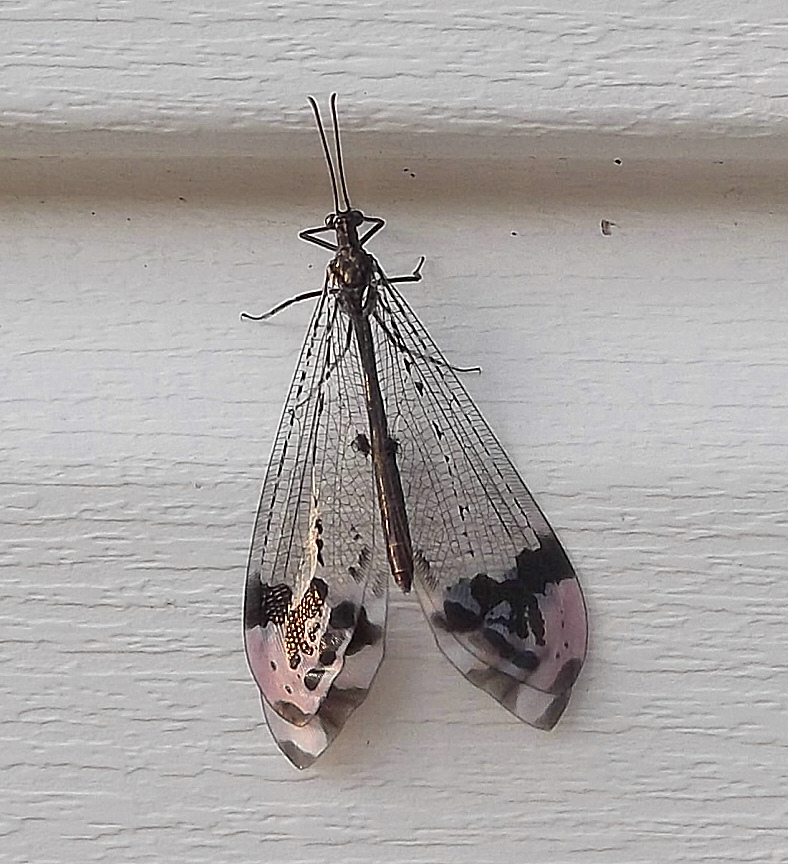
- Glenurus gratus

Scientific classification
- Domain: Eukaryota
- Kingdom: Animalia
- Phylum: Arthropoda
- Class: Insecta
- Order: Neuroptera
- Family: Myrmeleontidae
- Subfamily: Nemoleontinae
- Tribe: Glenurini
- Genus: Glenurus; Hagen, 1866

= Glenurus =

Genus of insects

Glenurus is a genus of antlions in the family Myrmeleontidae and typical of the tribe Glenurini. There are about 12 described species in Glenurus.

== Species ==
These 12 species belong to the genus Glenurus:

- Glenurus atomatus C.-k. Yang, 1986
- Glenurus croesus Banks, 1922
- Glenurus fuscilomus C.-k. Yang, 1986
- Glenurus gratus (Say, 1839)
- Glenurus heteropteryx Gerstaecker, 1885
- Glenurus incalis Banks, 1922
- Glenurus luniger Gerstaecker, 1894
- Glenurus peculiaris (Walker, 1860)
- Glenurus penningtoni (Navás, 1918)
- Glenurus posticus Navás, 1913
- Glenurus proi Navás, 1930
- Glenurus snowii Banks, 1907
