= Euptilon sinuatum =

Scientific classification
- Domain: Eukaryota
- Kingdom: Animalia
- Phylum: Arthropoda
- Class: Insecta
- Order: Neuroptera
- Family: Myrmeleontidae
- Genus: Euptilon
- Species: E. sinuatum

Binomial name
- Euptilon sinuatum (Currie, 1903)

Synonyms
- Psammoleon sinuatus Currie, 1903

Species of insect

Euptilon sinuatum is a species of antlion in the family Myrmeleontidae. It is found in Central America and North America.
