= Megistopus =

Scientific classification
- Kingdom: Animalia
- Phylum: Arthropoda
- Class: Insecta
- Order: Neuroptera
- Family: Myrmeleontidae
- Tribe: Glenurini
- Genus: Megistopus; Rambur, 1842

Genus of insects

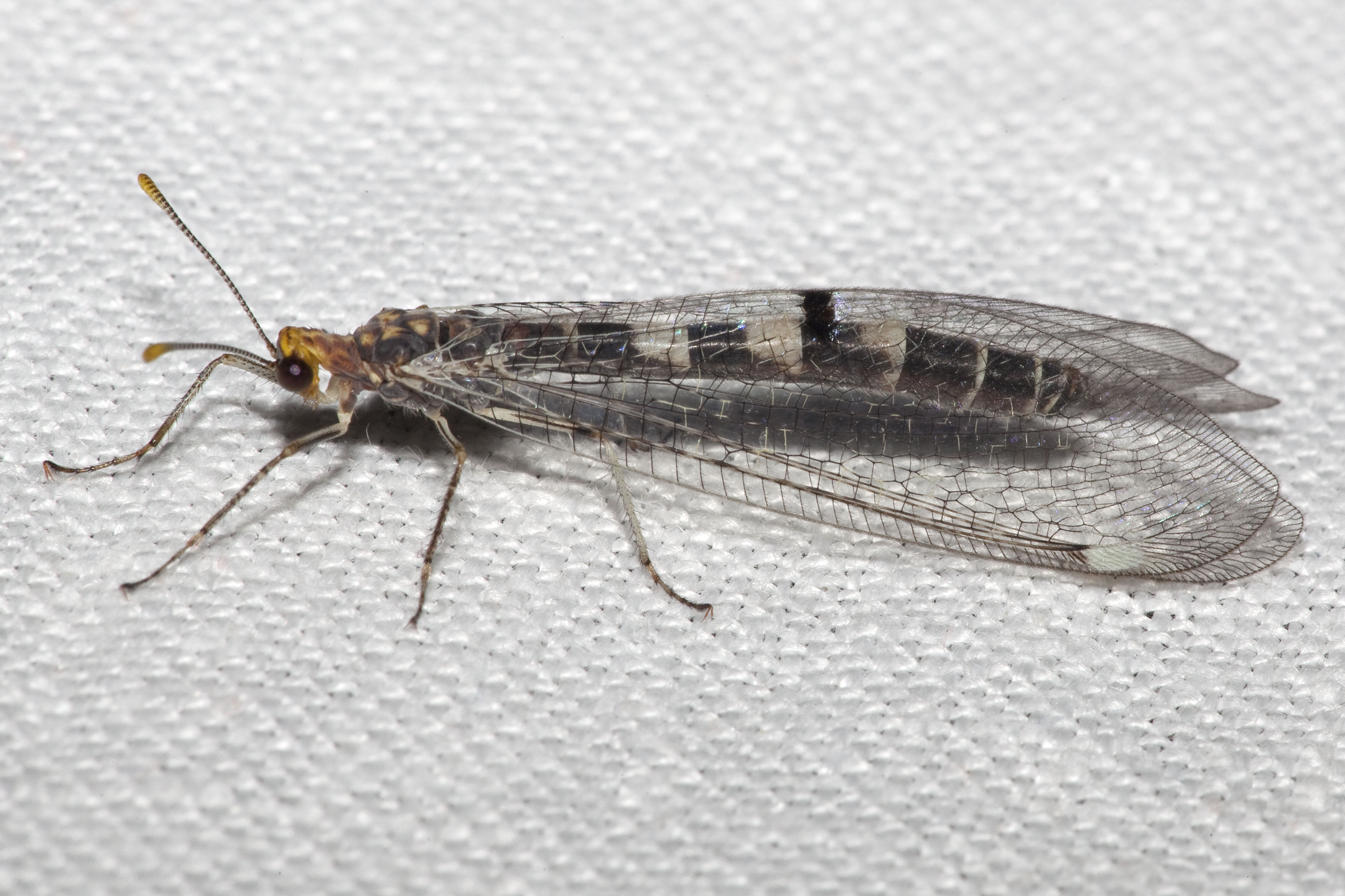

Megistopus is a genus of antlions belonging to the family Myrmeleontidae.

The species of this genus are found in Southern Europe.

== Species ==
BioLib and GBIF include:

1. Megistopus flavicornis (Rossi, 1790)
2. Megistopus lucasi (Navás, 1912)
3. Megistopus mirabilis Hölzel, 1980
