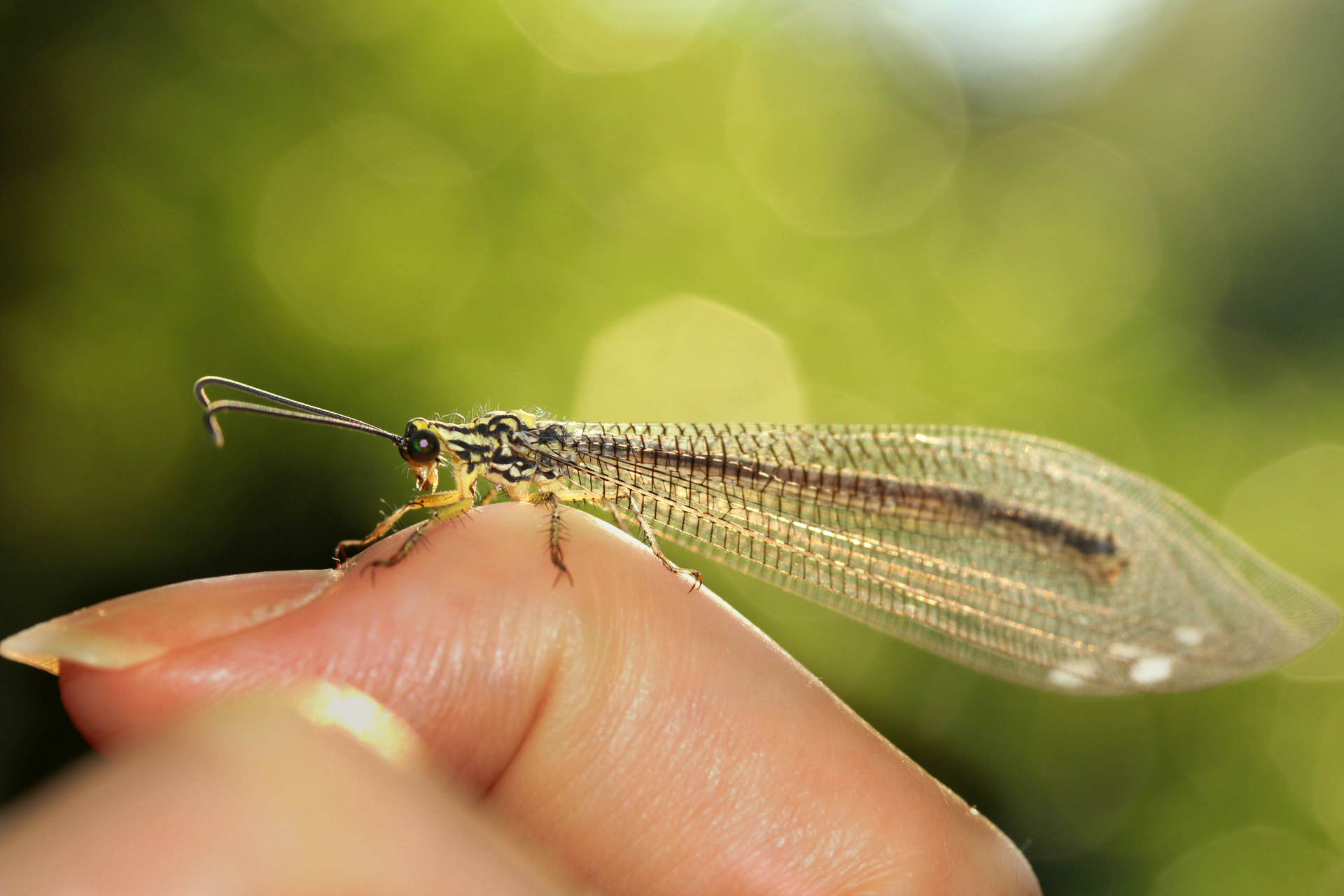

Scientific classification
- Kingdom: Animalia
- Phylum: Arthropoda
- Clade: Pancrustacea
- Class: Insecta
- Order: Neuroptera
- Family: Myrmeleontidae
- Genus: Banyutus
- Species: B. lethalis

Binomial name
- Banyutus lethalis (Walker, 1853)

= Banyutus lethalis =

Species of insect

Banyutus lethalis is an Afrotropical antlion. It was described by Francis Walker in 1853. It is proposed as the mimic for the gregarious African antlion, Hagenomyia tristis, but can be identified based on the longer antennae and a bicoloured pterostigma. Both species fly gregariously through long grass and can be collected together. The larvae of B. lethalis are non-pit building, whereas those of H. tristis are pit-builders.
