= Banyutus =

Scientific classification
- Domain: Eukaryota
- Kingdom: Animalia
- Phylum: Arthropoda
- Class: Insecta
- Order: Neuroptera
- Family: Myrmeleontidae
- Genus: Banyutus; Navás, 1912

Genus of insects

Banyutus is a genus of antlions belonging to the family Myrmeleontidae.

The species of this genus are found in Southern Africa.

Species:

- Banyutus acutus Navás, 1912
- Banyutus elisabethanus (Navás, 1925)
- Banyutus feai (Navás, 1915)
- Banyutus hesione (Banks, 1911)
- Banyutus horridus Navás, 1912
- Banyutus idoneus (Banks, 1911)
- Banyutus insidiosus Navás, 1912
- Banyutus lethalis (Walker, 1853)
- Banyutus lethifer Navás, 1912
- Banyutus lituratus Navás, 1936
- Banyutus lombardi (Navás, 1916)
- Banyutus maynei Navás, 1914
- Banyutus neuter Navás, 1912
- Banyutus pulverulentus (Rambur, 1842)
- Banyutus quarrei (Navás, 1932)
- Banyutus roseostigma Navás, 1914
- Banyutus shimba Kimmins, 1956
