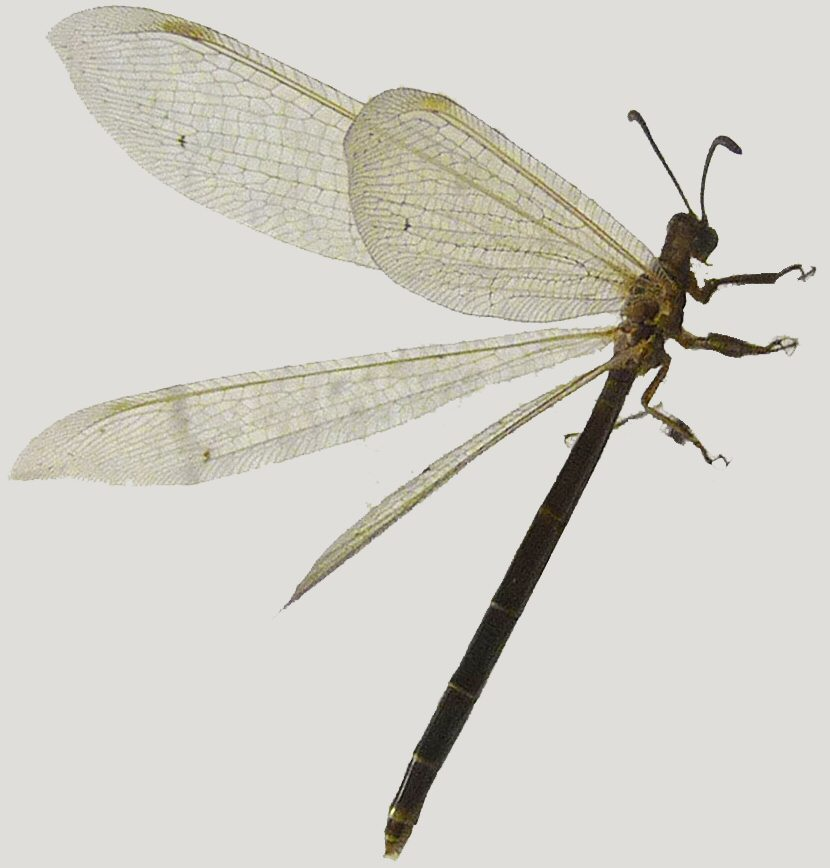
- Creoleon sp.

Scientific classification
- Kingdom: Animalia
- Phylum: Arthropoda
- Class: Insecta
- Order: Neuroptera
- Family: Myrmeleontidae
- Subfamily: Nemoleontinae; Banks, 1911

= Nemoleontinae =

Subfamily of insects

The Nemoleontinae are a subfamily of ant-lions, erected by Nathan Banks in 1911.

== Tribes and genera ==
Some authorities place genera elsewhere (such as the Myrmeleontinae) but BioLib includes 8 tribes, with the following genera:

=== Creoleontini ===
Authority: Markl, 1954

1. Creoleon Tillyard, 1918
2. Exiliunguleon Yang, 1999
3. Yunleon Yang, 1986

Delfimeini

Authority: Krivokhatsky, 1998

1. Delfimeus Navás, 1912

=== Distoleontini ===
Authority: Tillyard, 1916

1. Banyutus Navás, 1912
2. Campestretus Navás, 1933
3. Deutoleon Navás, 1927
4. Distoleon Banks, 1910
5. Distonemurus Krivokhatsky, 1992
6. Episalus Gerstaecker, 1884
7. Neleoma Navás, 1914
8. Weeleus Navás, 1912

=== Glenurini ===
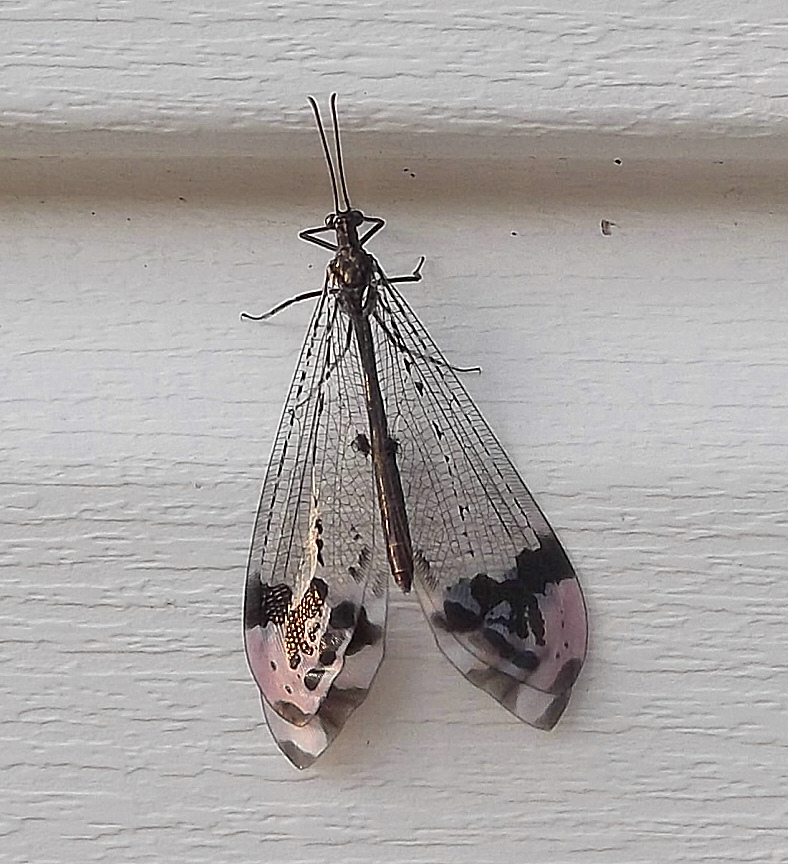
Glenurus gratus

Authority: Banks, 1927

1. Araucaleon Banks, 1939
2. Dominikon Dobosz, Krivokhatsky & Ábrahám, 2022
3. Elachyleon Esben-Petersen, 1927
4. Eremoleon Banks, 1901
5. Euptilon Westwood in Drury, 1837
6. Glenurus Hagen, 1866
7. Indophanes Banks, 1940
8. Megistopus Rambur, 1842
9. Navasoleon Banks, 1943
10. Nedroledon Navás, 1914
11. Paraglenurus Van der Weele, 1909
12. Psammoleon Banks, 1899

Gymnocnemini;

Authority: Navas, 1912

1. Gymnocnemia Schneider, 1845

Macronemurini

Authority: Esben-Petersen, 1918

Nemoleontini

Authority: Banks, 1911

=== Pseudoformycaleontini ===
Authority: Holzel, 1987

1. Ganguilus Navás, 1912
2. Nicarinus Navás, 1914
3. Pseudoformicaleo van der Weele, 1909
4. Vinga (insect) Navás, 1928
